= Jane Decker =

American singer-songwriter (born 1994)

- Also known as: Decker
- Born: Jane Ellen Decker Smith; April 29, 1994 (age 32)
- Origin: Cincinnati, Ohio
- Genres: Pop; indie pop; folk
- Occupations: Singer, songwriter
- Years active: 2012–present
- Formerly of: Formulas; Belle Histoire

Jane Ellen Decker Smith (born April 29, 1994), known by the stage name Jane Decker and formerly as simply Decker, is an American singer and songwriter from Cincinnati, Ohio. As a teenager, Decker fronted the bands Formulas and Belle Histoire, the latter of which was signed to InVogue Records. After Belle Histoire's dissolution, she appeared on The Voice in 2013, where she attracted attention despite not advancing, and subsequently began releasing solo music, including two EPs in 2015.

== Early life ==
Born Jane Smith, Decker grew up in Cincinnati, Ohio, where her parents encouraged her to pursue music. At age ten, shortly after she'd begun writing songs, both of her parents were diagnosed with cancer, and her father died when she was 12; shortly afterward, she began recording her first songs, something her father had encouraged in his final months.

== Career ==
=== Early bands (2010–2013) ===
At age 14, Decker joined her first band, a short-lived Paramore-esque pop punk band called Formulas (previously Delta Delta! with singer Kelc Galluzzo). While in Formulas, Decker found herself writing songs that did not fit Formulas' punk style, and her brother John encouraged her to record them, offering to recruit musicians and pay for recording sessions. With the breakup of Formulas, the 16-year-old Decker formed the indie pop group Belle Histoire in 2011, with guitarists Aaron Hunt (formerly of Seabird) and Austin Livingood, bassist Mitch Winsett, and Formulas drummer Wes Comer.

After an independent EP in 2011, Belle Histoire signed to InVogue Records in early 2012, where they released a second EP, I Can Tell, and the full-length debut Dreamers that same year. During their existence, the group received attention from Alternative Press and AbsolutePunk and performed at MidPoint Music Festival and the inaugural Bunbury Music Festival. Decker also separately joined Chiodos frontman Craig Owens for his 2012 solo tour. The group eventually dissolved in 2013, due to member departures as well as Decker's desire for a solo career.

=== Decker and The Voice audition (2013) ===
In March 2013, Jane Decker introduced a new solo project, simply titled Decker, with the single "Swing"; a clip was posted to Facebook with the song being released shortly afterward. A video for "Swing" was released on April 17, and the first Decker EP, Clean Hands, was released on April 22, 2013. In July, Decker performed at Twentieth Century Theatre alongside Plain White T's and The Wind and The Wave, and in October she appeared at Fountain Square's Rocktober Series with 500 Miles to Memphis and Mike Oberst.

At the advice of her management, Decker competed on season 4 of the reality singing series The Voice, performing a blind audition of Florence and the Machine's "You've Got the Love". While she ultimately did not advance, Decker's appearance on the show received attention on Twitter and Rolling Stone included her in a list of the season's "10 Most-Robbed Contestants". She later credited the audition with solidifying her decision to end Belle Histoire and pursue a solo career.

=== Pop career (2014–present) ===
In April 2014, Decker (now credited as Jane Decker) was featured on Hawthorne Heights frontman JT Woodruff's solo single "Dark Young Days". That summer, Decker performed an acoustic set at the third annual Bunbury Festival, sharing a date with Fall Out Boy, Paramore, Foxy Shazam, Cults, New Politics, Andrew W.K., Kishi Bashi, Morning Parade, Hunter Hunted, Bronze Radio Return, Caspian, and Lily & Madeleine. At Bunbury, she announced that she had recorded new music that would be released soon.

On March 31, 2015, Decker (now officially billed as Jane Decker) released a new single and music video, "Stonewallin'", via Yahoo! Music. An EP of the same name was released the following month on April 14, also spawning the single "Higher". In July, Decker performed at MidPoint Music Festival's Indie Summer Series at Fountain Square, alongside Saint Motel, The Modern Novas, and Grenades!?. In August, she played a Daytrotter Session and at the Taste of OTR festival alongside Goodbye June and Kansas Bible Company. She performed at the main MidPoint festival in September at Christian Moerlein Brewing Co., which also featured Purity Ring, Matthew E. White, Ride, Sylvan Esso, Heartless Bastards, Nick Diamonds, Roadkill Ghost Choir, Miracles of Modern Science, Wild Ones, Big Scary, Mothers, Turbo Fruits, Young Empires, Varsity, GGOOLLDD, JSPH, Dawg Yawp, Tyler Childers and the Food Stamps, Holiday Mountain, K.Flay, JR JR, Iron & Wine, and Tune-Yards. The festival also saw Decker release a second EP, 55, on September 25.

Speaking to Cincinnati Magazine in early 2016, Decker said that the year would be "definitely a time for writing and potentially a new release and some touring this fall." Later that year, she released a new single, "Don't Do That".

During the COVID-19 pandemic in April 2020, Decker began releasing a daily series of short covers on her Instagram. In May 2022, Decker announced on Twitter that she would be releasing her first new single in five years, entitled "Sidelines". The song was released on May 27.

== Artistry ==
After exploring pop punk, indie pop, and dream pop with her previous bands, Decker's Clean Hands EP exhibited a more folk-oriented sound, utilizing steel guitar and brush percussion and drawing comparisons to Tegan and Sara, Laura Marling, Elizabeth & the Catapult, Jem, and Tori Amos. With Stonewallin', she embraced a more traditional pop and power pop sound with electronic production that was compared to Lorde, Taylor Swift, and Haim. Decker said of the shift, "There’s a math behind pop music, and most other genres don’t have that. It’s really difficult, but it’s so rewarding when you get your own song stuck in your head," and that "Indie music is what I automatically write, but pop music is my favorite to record." She has cited Prince, Haim, and Betty Who among her musical influences.

== Personal life ==
As of 2015, Decker was dating John Vaughn, lead vocalist of the Ohio rock band PUBLIC.

== Discography ==
=== EPs ===
- 2013: Clean Hands (as Decker)
- 2015: Stonewallin'
- 2015: 55

=== Singles ===
- 2013: "Swing"
- 2015: "Stonewallin'"
- 2015: "Higher"
- 2016: "Don't Do That"
- 2022: "Sidelines"

=== Music videos ===
Year	Song	Director	Ref
2013	"Swing"	Valley Creative	
2015	"Stonewallin'"	Colton Williams	
2016	"Don't Do That"	Nate Nunumaker	

=== Featured appearances ===
- 2011: Aristo ft. Jane Smith, "This Isn't A Sad Song"
- 2014: JT Woodruff ft. Jane Smith, "Dark Young Days"
- 2016: Tales of the Forgotten ft. Jane Decker, "Believe"
- 2017: Landon Austin ft. Jane Decker, "Dancing On My Own" (acoustic Robyn cover)
- 2019: Landon Austin ft. Jane Decker, "Never Let You Go" (acoustic Third Eye Blind cover)

=== With Belle Histoire ===
- 2012: Dreamers (InVogue)

=== With Formulas ===
- Unsaid, Undone EP (2010)
