= Belle Histoire =

American indie pop group (2011–2013)

- Also known as: The History (2011)
- Origin: Cincinnati, Ohio/Covington, Kentucky, U.S.
- Genres: Indie pop; indie rock; dream pop
- Years active: 2011–2013
- Label: InVogue
- Spinoff of: Formulas; Seabird
- Past members: Jane Smith; Aaron Hunt; Austin Livingood; Mitch Winsett; Wes Comer

Belle Histoire was an American indie pop group. Formed in 2011 in Cincinnati, Ohio, the group consisted of vocalist Jane Smith, guitarists Aaron Hunt and Austin Livingood, bassist Mitch Winsett, and percussionist Wes Comer. They released an independent EP, Spirits, before signing to InVogue Records in 2012, through which they released a second EP, I Can Tell, and their debut album Dreamers that same year. Despite their brief existence, the group saw regional success, receiving coverage from Alternative Press and AbsolutePunk and performing at MidPoint Music Festival and the inaugural Bunbury Music Festival. Following their dissolution, Smith received attention as a solo artist, particularly a notable audition on The Voice.

== History ==
=== Origins and Spirits ===
Belle Histoire was formed in Cincinnati, Ohio in 2011. Prior to forming Belle Histoire, lead vocalist Jane Smith and drummer Wes Comer were members of the pop punk band Formulas. Eventually, Smith found herself writing "artsy, more creative" songs that did not fit Formulas, and her brother John encouraged her to record them, offering to help recruit musicians and pay for recording sessions. Shortly after the dissolution of Formulas, the Smith siblings recruited Comer and two guitarists, former Seabird member Aaron Hunt and Austin Livingood, a friend of Jane's. The band recorded their debut EP, Spirits, at Brandon Weaver's Iron Wing studio in Covington, Kentucky; Weaver convinced the band, then named The History, to adopt the more unique Belle Histoire, French for "beautiful history" or "beautiful story". The EP was produced by Hunt with Jane doing the bulk of the songwriting. During the recording of their second EP, I Can Tell, bassist Mitch Winsett joined the group in May 2011.

That summer, Belle Histoire joined MidPoint Music Festival's Indie Summer Series at Fountain Square, alongside Javelin, July for Kings, and Ted Leo. They also played a show in June with Mansions, I Can Make a Mess, and Into It. Over It., and in August they opened for Cold War Kids. In December, Cincinnati CityBeat listed their Spirits EP as one of the top 100 local releases of 2011.

=== Signing to InVogue and I Can Tell ===
On January 12, 2012, it was announced that Belle Histoire had signed to InVogue Records, where they would release I Can Tell on February 14 and begin recording their debut full-length album in March. Jane Smith had been friends with label head Nick Moore since her days in Formulas. Later in January, Alternative Press premiered the band's music video for "Be Alright", the lead single from I Can Tell, and AbsolutePunk included the group's upcoming debut album on their "Most Anticipated Albums of 2012" list. Alternative Press also premiered the EP's second single, "Misguided", in early February. On February 13, InVogue hosted an exclusive listening party for I Can Tell via AOL Music and Spinner, and the EP was released the following day. A third single, "Stay Awhile", was made available for free digital download via the website RCRD LBL.

In April, Bell Histoire played a stop of Hawthorne Heights' "Stripped Down to the Bone Tour" with Mark Rose of Spitalfield and performed at the Clifton Heights Music Festival with acts including Cabin and Sullivan. In May, Belle Histoire opened for labelmate Before Their Eyes on their "Redemption Tour", while Jane Smith alone joined Chiodos frontman Craig Owens for his solo tour.

=== Dreamers ===
A music video for "Stay Awhile" was premiered by Alternative Press on June 5, while AbsolutePunk exclusively streamed "My Dear", the lead single from the band's upcoming full-length album Dreamers, on June 12. That same month, Belle Histoire returned to the MidPoint Indie Summer Series alongside The Bright Light Social Hour, Buffalo Killers, Khaira Arby, Wymond Miles of The Fresh & Onlys, Art vs. Science, The Psychodots, Lydia Loveless, Patrick Sweany, Ha Ha Tonka, The Ridges, Orgone, Bear Hands, Lightning Love, Fort Lean, The Budos Band, Kansas Bible Company, Class Actress, Wussy, and R. Ring. They also performed a show with Vanity Theft in Dayton.

A second single from Dreamers, "We'll Never Learn", was released via Alternative Press on July 16, and the album was released the following day. Belle Histoire toured with The Orphan The Poet throughout July, and performed at the inaugural Bunbury Music Festival, headlined by Jane's Addiction, Weezer, and Death Cab for Cutie with acts including Neon Trees, Crash Kings, The Airborne Toxic Event, Foxy Shazam, Imagine Dragons, Manchester Orchestra, Grouplove, The Gaslight Anthem, Guided by Voices, and City and Colour; Belle Histoire shared a stage with Child Bite, Now, Now, Margot & the Nuclear So and So's, and Passion Pit (the latter of whom cancelled due to illness). They played a stop on Chiodos Reunion Tour in August, and in September, they made their debut at the main MidPoint Music Festival, with a lineup including Pomegranates, Mad Anthony, Bad Veins, and The Antlers.

A music video for "My Dear" was released via Alternative Press on January 17, 2013. The magazine also included Belle Histoire in a list of "100 Bands You Need To Know in 2013". In April, the band once again played the MidPoint Indie Summer Series, this time alongside We Were Promised Jetpacks, Mike Mains & The Branches, The Dopamines, Margot & the Nuclear So and So's, Matt Pond, Plumb, Drew Holcomb and the Neighbors, and Why?.

=== Dissolution ===
Following the release of Dreamers in July 2012, Aaron Hunt left Belle Histoire to focus on production, with their Bunbury show serving as his last with the band. Austin Livingood left soon after to pursue a solo career, and Jane Smith decided to put the group on hiatus in 2013 to record and promote a solo EP. An appearance by Smith on season 4 of the reality singing series The Voice, where she covered Florence and the Machine's "You've Got the Love", solidified her decision to pursue a solo career rather than continue the band.

Speaking to Cincinnati CityBeat in 2015, Smith recalled that the band "was getting awful tours, playing awful shows, our guitarist had just quit. We did amazing in Cincinnati and that's sort of where it ended. [...] So I did The Voice, and when I came back, I kept moving in a different direction, but everything at home stopped. We couldn't push (the band's) music; we couldn't record. After The Voice, I wrote for awhile, did the EP, and it was more in that Indie range — more than the Pop I'm doing now. I decided that I needed to choose something that I think I can be good at."

== Musical style ==
Belle Histoire occupied the indie rock, indie pop, pop rock, and dream pop genres, with Mike Breen of Cincinnati CityBeat describing them as "a heartland translation of The Cranberries with dashes of Coldplay and U2". Other outlets drew comparisons to Regina Spektor, Florence and the Machine, The Civil Wars, Eisley, Deas Vail, Laura Stevenson and the Cans, Feist, States, Madi Diaz, Ingrid Michaelson, and Stars. Band members cited influences including Coldplay, Young the Giant, Phantom Planet, Fun., The Civil Wars, Bruce Springsteen, Josh Ritter, James Taylor, Sara Bareilles, and jazz music.

== Members ==
- Jane Smith – lead vocals, keyboards (2011–2013)
- Aaron Hunt – guitar, keys, percussion, vocals (2011–2012)
- Austin Livingood – guitar, vocals (2011–2012)
- Mitch Winsett – bass, vocals (2011–2013)
- Wes Comer – drums, percussion (2011–2013)

== Discography ==
=== Albums ===
- Dreamers (2012, InVogue)

=== Extended plays ===
- Spirits EP (2011, self-released)
- I Can Tell (2012, InVogue)

=== Singles ===
Year	Title	Album	Ref
2011	"Spirits"	Spirits EP	
2011	"Nightmares"	Spirits EP	
2012	"Be Alright"	I Can Tell EP	
2012	"Misguided"	I Can Tell EP	
2012	"Stay Awhile"	I Can Tell EP	
2012	"My Dear"	Dreamers	
2012	"We'll Never Learn"	Dreamers	

=== Music videos ===
Year	Song	Director	Ref
2011	"Nightmares" (live video)	Jessica Lyne' Ross	
2012	"Be Alright"	Jeffrey Riley	
2012	"Stay Awhile"		
2013	"My Dear"	Jeffrey Riley	
