= Bunbury Music Festival =

Annual music festival in Cincinnati, Ohio, U.S.

- Dates: June/July
- Locations: Sawyer Point Park & Yeatman's Cove; Cincinnati, Ohio, U.S.
- Years active: 2012–2019
- Founders: Bill Donabedian
- Attendance: 43,000 (2016)
- Capacity: 20,000 per day
- Organiser: Promowest Productions
- Website: bunburyfestival.com

The Bunbury Music Festival was a three-day music festival in Cincinnati, Ohio, United States, at Sawyer Point Park & Yeatman's Cove on the banks of the Ohio River. Each annual event typically featured over 100 acts performing on three to six separate stages through the park. The festival was founded by MidPoint Music Festival co-founder and former Fountain Square managing director Bill Donabedian. The festival's inaugural event took place July 13–15, 2012. In 2014, Bunbury was purchased by PromoWest Productions, an entertainment company operating out of Columbus, Ohio.

The most recent iteration of the event occurred May 31 through June 2, 2019. The 2020 festival was cancelled due to the COVID-19 pandemic, and the organizers have said that the event "will not be returning in the way that you all have grown to know it and love it".

== List of events ==
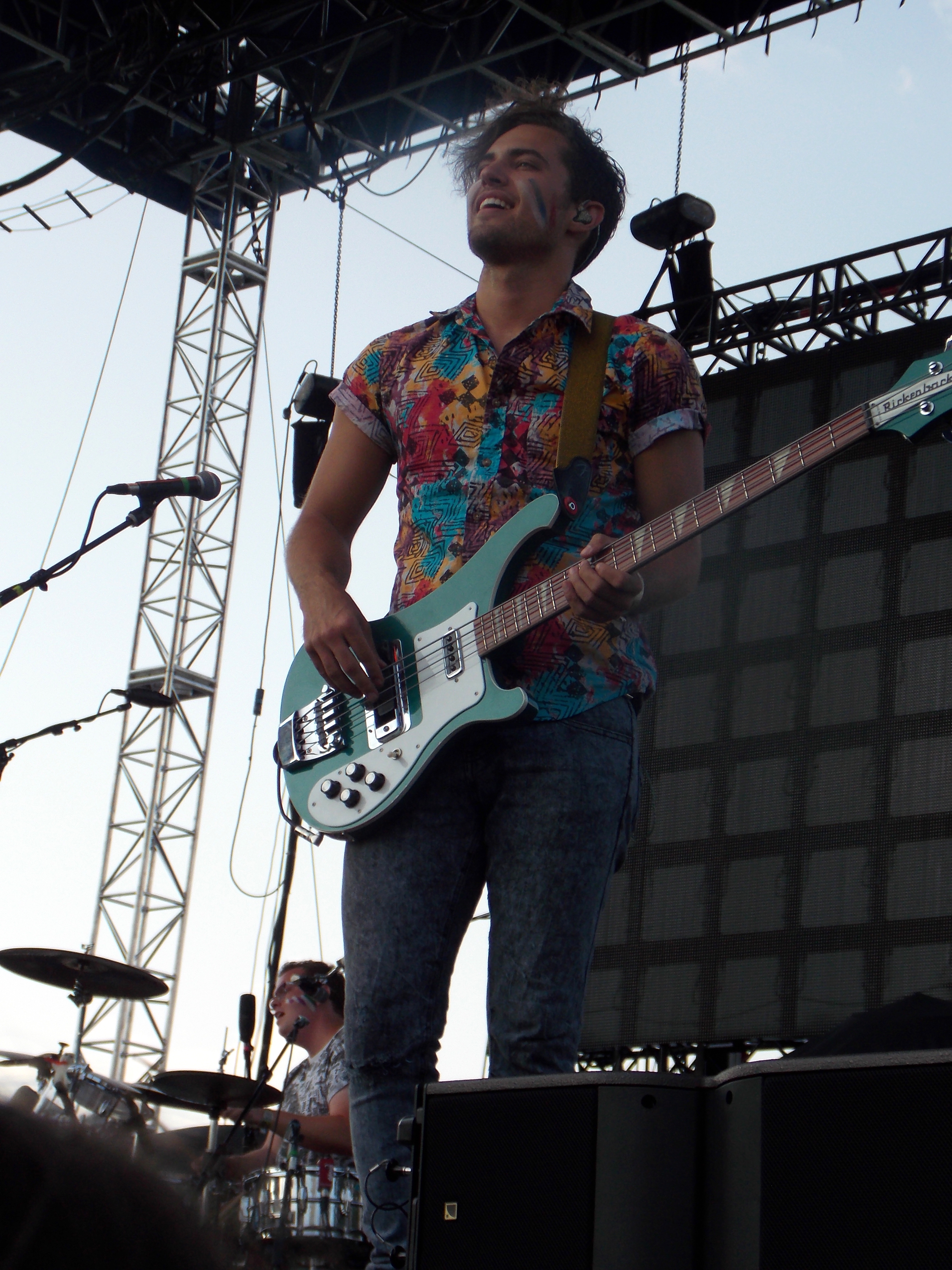
Walk the Moon's Kevin Ray performing at Bunbury 2013

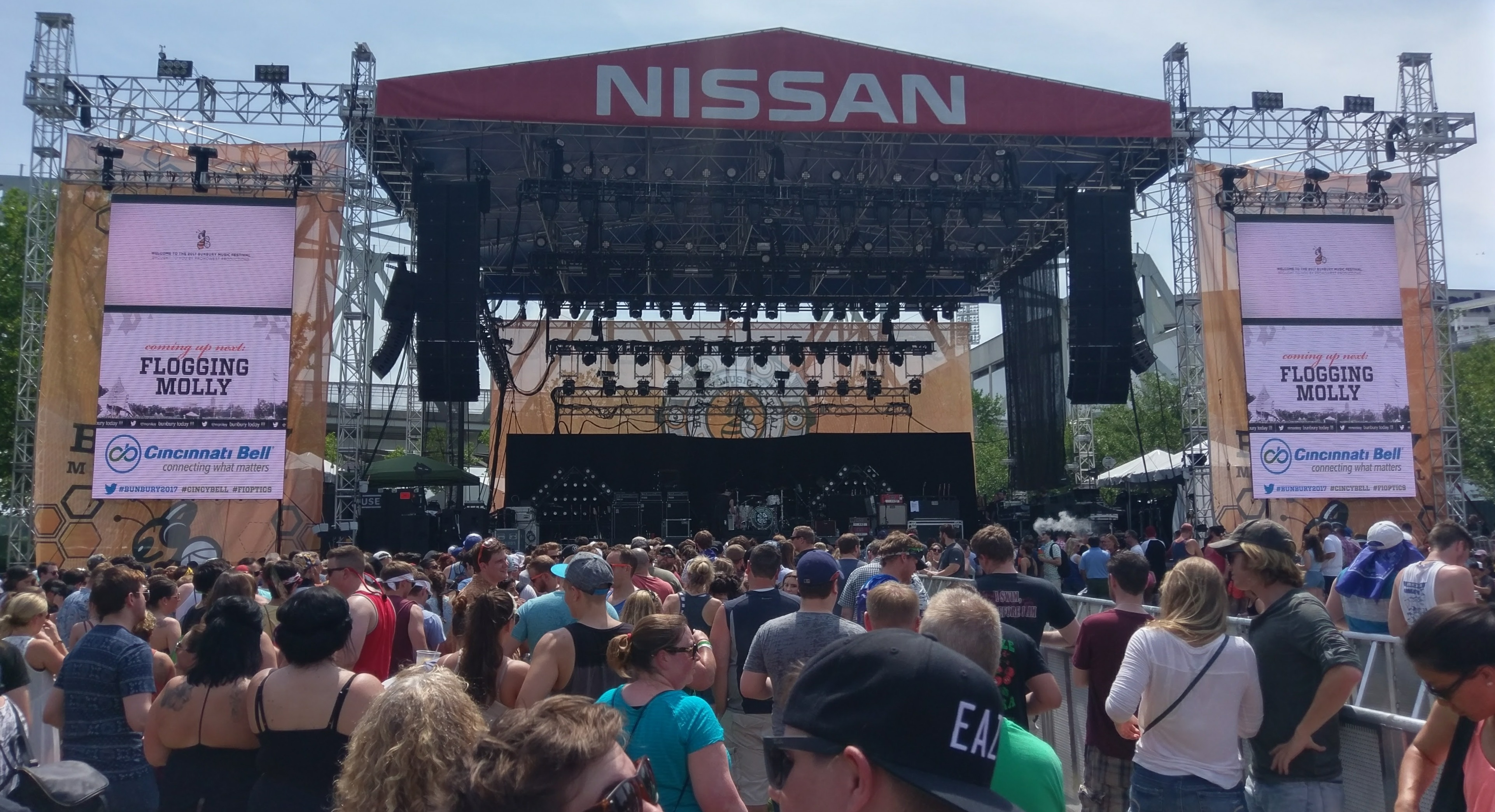
The main stage at Bunbury 2017

Dates	Headliners	Attendance
July 13–15, 2012	Jane's Addiction, Weezer, Death Cab for Cutie View full lineup Friday, July 13 Globili Stage: Scars on 45, Capital Cities, Kids These Days, Crash Kings, O.A.R., Airborne Toxic Event, Jane's Addiction Landor Stage: Find Vienna, She Does Is Magic, All Get Out, Ponderosa, Chappo, Foxy Shazam Red Bull DJ Stage: Ice Cold Tony, CJ the DJ, Alex Peace, DJ AMF, Mixin Marc, Alchemist Bud Light Stage: Bo & the Locomotive, Tristen, The Henry Clay People, L.P., Ra Ra Riot, Minus the Bear CMC Stage: Humble Home, Brent Kirby, Lauren Mann, Madi Diaz, Matt Pryor Alive One Stage: Pet Clinic, Emily & the Complexes, G. Miles and the Hitmen, The Minor Leagues, Quiet Corral, The Reverend Peyton's Big Damn Band Saturday, July 14 Globili Stage: The 4 on the Floor, Alberta Cross, Jukebox the Ghost, A Silent Film, Manchester Orchestra, The Gaslight Anthem, Weezer Landor Stage: Wheels On Fire, Hotfox, Secret Music, Graffiti6, The Bright Light Social Hour, Grouplove Red Bull DJ Stage: Davey C, DJ Etrayn, Big Once, DJ Ivy, DJ Spider, DJ Irie Bud Light Stage: Sphynx, 1,2,3, Messerly & Ewing, Imagine Dragons, Dan Deacon, RJD2 CMC Stage: Doop and the Inside Outlaws, The Shaw Brothers, Tracy Walker, Jeremy Pinnell and the 55's, Kevin Devine Alive One Stage: Old Lights, Black Taxi, The Sundresses, Lions Rampant, 500 Miles to Memphis, The Silent Comedy Sunday, July 15 Globili Stage: YAWN, Maps & Atlases, Lights, City and Colour, Neon Trees, Death Cab For Cutie Landor Stage: Archer's Paradox, Nikki Lane, Wussy, The Deep Dark Woods, Good Old War, Guided By Voices Red Bull DJ Stage: DJ Prism, DJ K-Dogg, DJ D-Lo, Mr. Best, Mick Boogie Bud Light Stage: Child Bite, Belle Histoire, Now, Now, Seedy Seeds, Margot & the Nuclear So and So's, Passion Pit* *Passion Pit cancelled due to band illness CMC Stage: Rachel Ann Figley, Jake Kolesar, Arlo McKinley and the Lonesome Sound, The Tillers, Will Hoge Alive One Stage: The Black Tape, Black Owls, Pomegranates, UME, Bad Veins	50,000
July 12–14, 2013	The National, Fun, MGMT View full lineup Friday, July 12 Main Stage: The Features, Delta Rae, Tegan and Sara, Walk the Moon, Fun Rockstar Stage: Beat Club, The Dunwells, Red Wanting Blue, Youngblood Hawke, DeVotchKa Cincinnatus Stage: Billy Wallace, Pete Dressman, Josh Eagle, Jay Nash Bud Light Stage: Public, American Authors, Everest, Sky Ferreira, Tokyo Police Club Lawn Stage: Alone At 3am, Old Baby, We Are Snapdragon, Seabird Amphitheater Stage: The Mitchells, Ohio Knife, State Song, Buffalo Killers, Those Darlins Saturday, July 13 Main Stage: Empires, Robert DeLong, Twenty One Pilots, Cake, MGMT Rockstar Stage: X Ambassadors, Civil Twilight, Chairlift, We Are Scientists, Divine Fits Cincinnatus Stage: Margaret Darling, Taylor Alexander, Tim Carr, Christopher Paul Stelling Bud Light Stage: Culture Queer, Vacationer, The Mowgli's, Oberhofer, Atlas Genius Lawn Stage: The Ready Stance, The Bears Of Blue River, Black Owls, You, You're Awesome Amphitheater Stage: New Vega, Messerly And Ewing, Ben Walz Band, The Pinstripes, Bear Hands Sunday, July 14 Main Stage: Joe Purdy, Gregory Alan Isakov, Camera Obscura, Belle and Sebastian, The National Rockstar Stage: The Knocks, A Silent Film, Night Terrors of 1927, Yo La Tengo Cincinnatus Stage: Ben Knight, Jake Kolesar, Mark Utley, Channing & Quinn Bud Light Stage: Gringo Star, High Highs, Savoir Adore, Black Joe Lewis & the Honeybears Lawn Stage: Mia Carruthers Bethesda, The Harlequins, DAAP Girls, Jane Decker Amphitheater Stage: The Upset Victory, Green Light Morning, The Hiders, Daniel Martin Moore	60,000
July 11–13, 2014	Fall Out Boy, Paramore, The Flaming Lips View full lineup Friday, July 11 Main Stage: X Ambassadors, Wild Cub, Cage the Elephant, Fitz and the Tantrums, Empire of the Sun River Stage: Royal Teeth, Hundred Waters, J Roddy Walston and the Business, Bad Suns, Veruca Salt Acoustic Stage Here Among the Mountains, Russell Howard, Aaron Lee Tasjan, Marc Scibilia Warsteiner Stage: Snowmime, Panama Wedding, Mystery Skulls, Meg Myers, Dead Sara, Heartless Bastards Lawn Stage: Goldwing, 500 Miles to Memphis, The Fanged Robot, Black Owls Amphitheater Stage: The Upset Victory, Let It Happen, Family and Friends, Lydia Loveless, Psychodots Saturday, July 12 Main Stage: Crass Mammoth, New Politics, Cults, Paramore, Fall Out Boy River Stage: Lily and Madeleine, Caspian, Kishi Bashi, Morning Parade, Foxy Shazam Acoustic Stage Yellow Paper Planes, Eva Ross, Austin Livingood, Molly Sullivan Warsteiner Stage: Miner, Bronze Radio Return, Fly Golden Eagle, Hunter Hunted, Andrew W.K. Lawn Stage: Big Fresh, Bonesetters, Modoc, Jane Decker Amphitheater Stage: Brent James and the Vintage Youth, G. Miles and the Hitmen, Jesse Thomas, Pluto Revolts, The Pass Sunday, July 13 *Some bands delayed/cancelled due to weather Main Stage: Brick + Mortar, Red Wanting Blue, ZZ Ward, Young the Giant, The Flaming Lips River Stage: The Lighthouse and the Whaler, Kopecky Family Band, Robert DeLong, Holy Ghost! Acoustic Stage Daniel In Stereo, James Gilmore, Kelly Thomas, Dan Tedesco Warsteiner Stage: Kim Taylor, The Black Cadillacs, Joywave, Bear Hands, The Orwells Lawn Stage: Clairaudients, The Easthills, The Yugos, Motherfolk Amphitheater Stage: Young Heirlooms, Lamps & Voids, The Harbour, Saintseneca	
June 5–7, 2015	The Black Keys, The Avett Brothers, Snoop Dogg View full lineup Friday, June 5 Yeatman's Cove Stage: Wussy, Multimagic, Father John Misty, Bleachers, Walk the Moon, The Black Keys River Stage: Machine Heart, Mikky Ekko, Catfish and the Bottlemen Pavilion Stage: Indigo Wild, Go Analog, Mini Mansions, Royal Blood Sawyer Point Stage: Markham, Kid Runner, Temples, Matt and Kim, Tame Impala Saturday, June 6 Yeatman's Cove Stage: Zach Longoria Project, Austin Plaine, Genevieve, Lindsey Stirling, Kacey Musgraves, The Avett Brothers River Stage: Bummers, The Secret Sisters, Jamestown Revival Pavilion Stage: Daniel In Stereo, Motherfolk, Graceful Closure, The Reverend Horton Heat Sawyer Point Stage: Playing To Vapors, Old Hundred, The Devil Makes Three, The Decemberists, Old Crow Medicine Show Sunday, June 7 Yeatman's Cove Stage: The Front Bottoms, Manchester Orchestra, Brand New, Snoop Dogg River Stage: 500 Miles to Memphis, The Reverend Peyton's Big Damn Band, Shakey Graves Pavilion Stage: Lonesome As Gold, Jessica Hernandez & the Deltas, Alex Angelo Sawyer Point Stage: Pluto Revolts, Buggs Tha Rocka, Lil Dicky, Atmosphere, Twenty One Pilots	54–56,000
June 3–5, 2016	The Killers, Ice Cube, Mudcrutch, Florence and the Machine View full lineup Friday, June 3 Yeatman's Cover Stage: Lydia, The Shelters, The Mowgli's, Charles Bradley and His Extraordinaires, Haim, The Killers CVG River Stage: Louis the Child, The Dear Hunter, The Wombats, J Roddy Walston and the Business Sawyer Point Stage: Leggy, Whilk & Misky, Red Wanting Blue, PVRIS, X Ambassadors, Mudcrutch Saturday, June 4 Yeatman's Cover Stage: Dead Man String Band, Oddisee, The Worn Flints, G. Love & Special Sauce, Umphrey's McGee, deadmau5 CVG River Stage: Dawg Yawp, Automagik, Conner Youngblood, Cal Scruby, Grizfolk, Diarrhea Planet Sawyer Point Stage: Jeremy Pinnell, Foxing, Austin Plaine, The Neighbourhood, Big Grams, Ice Cube Sunday, June 5 *Tears for Fears cancelled due to family illness Yeatman's Cover Stage: Jared Mahone, LANY, Grimes, Of Monsters and Men, Florence and the Machine CVG River Stage: Mad Anthony, Holy White Hounds, Arlo McKinley & The Lonesome Sound, Coleman Hell, Here Come the Mummies Sawyer Point Stage: Room For Zero, Flint Eastwood, Bayside, Elle King	43,000
June 2–4, 2017	Muse, Wiz Khalifa, G-Eazy, Bassnectar, Pretty Lights View full lineup Friday, June 2 Nissan Stage: Flor, NF, Mike Stud, G-Eazy, Wiz Khalifa CVG River Stage: The Upset Victory, Alex Angelo, Civil Twilight, Mutemath Sawyer Point Stage: Flying Underground, July Talk, Eden, The Shins, Death Cab for Cutie Southwest Sound Stage: Dave Buker & The Historians, The Cordial Sins, Jared Mahone, Clubhouse Saturday, June 3 Nissan Stage: Kevin Garrett, Frenship, Hayley Kiyoko, Tech N9ne, Bassnectar CVG River Stage: Charlie Hirsch, Liberty Deep Down, VHS Collection, CVBZ Sawyer Point Stage: Current Events, Cobi, San Fermin, DRAM, Pretty Lights Southwest Sound Stage: Yellow Paper Planes, Lemon Sky, Emily & The Complexes, Sarob Sunday, June 4 Nissan Stage: CAAMP, Flogging Molly, AFI, Thirty Seconds to Mars, Muse CVG River Stage: Time Cat, Arkells, Watsky, The Reverend Horton Heat Sawyer Point Stage: White Reaper, Dreamers, Moon Taxi, Jon Bellion, The 1975 Southwest Sound Stage: Circle It, Go Analog, Hello Luna, Liberty Deep Down	
June 1–3, 2018	Jack White, The Chainsmokers, Post Malone, Incubus View full lineup Friday, June 1 Nissan Stage: Welshly Arms, LANY, Fitz and the Tantrums, The Chainsmokers *Blink-182 was originally scheduled to perform but cancelled. CVG River Stage: Lift the Medium, Reo Cragun, Allan Rayman, Bishop Briggs Sawyer Point Stage: The Wrecks, Everything Everything, The Front Bottoms, Royal Blood, Young the Giant Acoustic Sound Stage: Personal Public, Lily McCabe, Lauren Eylise Saturday, June 2 Nissan Stage: Zoo Trippin', Third Eye Blind, GRiZ, Incubus CVG River Stage: Moonbeau, Tall Heights, Magic Giant, Arizona Sawyer Point Stage: Friday Giants, Vesperteen, Misterwives, Andrew McMahon in the Wilderness, Foster the People Acoustic Sound Stage: The Miners, Daniel in Stereo, Arlo McKinley Sunday, June 3 Nissan Stage: Lillie Mae, The Commonheart, Manchester Orchestra, Dropkick Murphys, Jack White CVG River Stage: McLovins, Two Feet, Sir Sly, Lecrae Sawyer Point Stage: Remo Drive, Bummers, Black Pistol Fire, Coheed and Cambria, Post Malone Acoustic Sound Stage: Jordan Kirk, Liberty Deep Down, Saving Escape	
May 31 – June 2, 2019	Fall Out Boy, Greta Van Fleet, The 1975, Girl Talk, Run the Jewels View full lineup Friday, May 31 Monster Energy Stage: RADATTACK, Poppy, Bayside, NF, Fall Out Boy CVG Stage: You vs Yesterday, Taylor Janzen, Witt Lowry, Pigeons Playing Ping Pong Sawyer Point Stage: The Orphan The Poet, HalfNoise, Joywave, Machine Gun Kelly, Stone Temple Pilots Metro by T-Mobile Acoustic Stage: Chandler Carter, Julian Kerins, James Gilmore Saturday, June 1 Monster Energy Stage: Great Good Fine Ok, Flora Cash, Dashboard Confessional, Awolnation, Greta Van Fleet CVG Stage: Shaed, The Blue Stones, Jukebox the Ghost, Blue October Sawyer Point Stage: 90's Kids, Common Kings, Tropidelic, Jeremy Zucker, Sublime with Rome, Metro by T-Mobile Acoustic Stage: iamchelseaiam, Young Heirlooms, Jack Burton Overdrive Sunday, June 2 Monster Energy Stage: The Candescents, The Aces, Streetlight Manifesto, Run the Jewels, The 1975 CVG Stage: Bülow, Lauren Sanderson, The Clarks, Lovelytheband, Sawyer Point Stage: Friday Pilots Club, Triiibe, Reignwolf, Clutch, Girl Talk, Metro by T-Mobile Acoustic Stage: Samuel Day, Trauma Illinois, Parker Louis	
June 5 – 7, 2020	Twenty One Pilots, Marshmello, The Avett Brothers, Kane Brown, Melanie Martinez, Angels & Airwaves	0 (virtual)

== Namesake ==
The name "Bunbury" was chosen by festival founder Bill Donabedian after he heard the word used in Oscar Wilde's play The Importance of Being Earnest. He chose the word because he thought it sounded whimsical and he liked the definition: "to have a made up excuse to get out of doing something boring." In Wilde's play, the character Algernon utilizes the fictional character named Bunbury as an excuse for getting out of undesirable situations such as family events. Not to be confused with the Western Australian city of Bunbury.
