= MidPoint Music Festival =

Annual music festival in Cincinnati, Ohio, U.S.

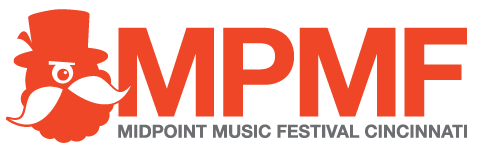
- Genre: Alternative rock, indie rock
- Locations: Cincinnati, Ohio, U.S.
- Years active: 2002–2017
- Website: mpmf.com

MidPoint Music Festival (MPMF) was an annual three-day independent music festival and music industry conference held in Cincinnati, Ohio, United States, from 2001 to 2017. The event took place every September in the city's downtown and historic Over-the-Rhine entertainment district. It was founded by Cincinnati musicians Bill Donabedian and Sean Rhiney. The festival was acquired in 2008 by Cincinnati CityBeat, a weekly alternative newspaper. In 2016, it was acquired by Music and Event Management Inc. (MEMI).

The festival expanded after CityBeat acquired it. The estimated attendance in 2008 was 13,500. By 2012, it had doubled to 27,000 people. This is partly due to the larger bands booked and the large outdoor space available for headliners at Washington Park in Over-the-Rhine, which was renovated in 2012.

The festival originally took place in various locations throughout the greater Cincinnati region (including one venue in Newport, Kentucky), but later it became located mostly in the downtown area and Over-the-Rhine.

== History ==
Most artists playing at MidPoint were alternative rock, indie rock, bluegrass, soul and singer-songwriters.

=== 2016 ===
The festival changed its format to be concentrated on 4 stages in parking lots in Over-the-Rhine. More than 75 bands are scheduled to perform. Bands included: Future Islands; Band of Horses; JJ Grey & Mofro; Tokyo Police Club; Reggie Watts; Lucero; Houndmouth; Antibalas; Frank Turner & The Sleeping Souls; Carseat Headrest; Wolf Parade; Frightened Rabbit; Kamasi Washington; Bob Mould

=== 2015 ===
The festival changed its format to run Friday, Saturday, Sunday. The Woodward Theatre was added as a core venue. Bands included: Betty Who; Caspian (band); Iron & Wine; K.Flay; Lydia Loveless; Matthew E. White; Patrick Watson (musician) Pure Bathing Culture; Purity Ring; Ride (band); Ryley Walker; Sarah Jaffe; Sylvan Esso; Strand of Oaks; Tune-Yards; Zola Jesus; Along The Shore

=== 2014 ===
This year's festival had approximately 140 showcases. Bands included: Baskery; Blues Control; Body Language (band); Bonesetters; Bully; Caroline Glaser; Chromeo; Colony House (band); Deafheaven; Dessa; Drowners; Dylan LeBlanc; Earth; EMA or Erika M. Anderson; Empires (band); Ex Hex (band); Gardens & Villa; Holy Ghost Tent Revival; Jessica Lea Mayfield; Joseph Arthur; Kid Congo Powers ft "Dizzy" Daniel Moorehead; Left Lane Cruiser; Liturgy (band); Lost in the Trees; Low Cut Connie; Maserati (band); Milagres (band); Miniature Tigers; Mutual Benefit (band); Nikki Lane; OK Go; Panda Bear (musician); Pontiak; Real Estate (band); Rubblebucket; Saintseneca; Speedy Ortiz; St. Paul and The Broken Bones; Sun Kil Moon; The Afghan Whigs; The Raveonettes; The Ridges; The Tontons; Tycho (musician); Watter; Why? (American band); and Wussy

=== 2013 ===
This year's festival had approximately 180 showcases. Bands included: Bad Veins; Baths (musician); Bear's Den (band); Black Rebel Motorcycle Club; Caveman; Cody Chesnutt; Cory Chisel and The Wandering Sons; Damien Jurado; Daughter (band); Deap Vally; Dent May; Ha Ha Tonka; Johnathan Rice; Kansas Bible Company; Kishi Bashi; Kurt Vile; Larry and His Flask; Low Cut Connie; METZ; Murder by Death (band); Nat Baldwin; Nerves Junior; Nicholas David; On An On; San Fermin (band); Saturday Looks Good To Me; Seabird (band); Shuggie Otis; St. Lenox; The Breeders; The Head and the Heart; The Ridges; The Thermals; Toy Soldiers (band); Twin Peaks (band); Vandaveer; Warpaint (band); Wild Cub; Wussy; and Youth Lagoon

=== 2012 ===
This year's festival had approximately 180 showcases. It was the first year with Washington Park serving as the main stage. The MidPoint Midway was expanded. Bands included: Andrew Bird; Bad Veins; Best Coast; Cheyenne Marie Mize; Cloud Nothings; Dinosaur Jr.; Dirty Projectors; Eternal Summers; F.Stokes; Frankie Rose; Freelance Whales; Grizzly Bear; Here We Go Magic; Holy Ghost Tent Revival; Hoots and Hellmouth; Hospitality; Hundred Waters; Imperial Teen; Julia Holter; Kansas Bible Company; Laetitia Sadier; Lord Huron; Lower Dens; Modoc; Pomegranates; Ralph Stanley; Rich Aucoin; Swear and Shake; Tennis; The Antlers; The Growlers; The Ridges; The Vespers; The Walkmen; Tim Easton; Turbo Fruits; Unknown Mortal Orchestra; Wild Belle; Willis Earl Beal; and Zeus

=== 2011 ===
This year's festival had approximately 200 showcases. The largest stage was at the Grammer's Tent. It was the first year for the MidPoint Midway on 12th street. Bands included: Asobi Seksu; Bear Hands; Booker T. Jones; Cheyenne Marie Mize; Cut Copy; Deerhoof; Delicate Steve; Empires (band); Gang Gang Dance; Gardens & Villa; Ivan & Alyosha; Jessica Lea Mayfield; Kaki King; Kim Taylor; Lydia Loveless; Man or Astro-Man?; Mates of State; Okkervil River; Pokey LaFarge; Santah; Starfucker; The Album Leaf; The Bright Light Social Hour; The Felice Brothers; The Joy Formidable; The Low Anthem; The Ridges; The Watson Twins; Those Darlins; Toro y Moi; U.S. Royalty; Unknown Mortal Orchestra; Vandaveer; Vanity Theft; Viva Voce (band); Washed Out; Xiu Xiu; and Youth Lagoon

=== 2010 ===
This year's festival had approximately 250 showcases. The largest stage was at the Grammer's Tent. There was an artist clubhouse at Neon's with acoustic sets. Instead of a Scion Streetcar service, the festival partnered with Metro to offer the MidPoint Transit Authority, free for festival goers, with acoustic performances on the bus. The downtown library also got involved, with free music showcases, a photography exhibition, and a musical film documentaries. Bands included several acts that went on to become much better known, including: +/- (band); A Place To Bury Strangers; Babe the Blue Ox (band); Best Coast; Caravan of Thieves; Caribou (band); Clare & the Reasons; Cults (band); Elf Power; Fang Island; Gaby Moreno; Girls Guns and Glory; Gold Motel; Ha Ha Tonka; Holy Fuck; Jason & the Scorchers; Jessica Lea Mayfield; Kopecky (band); Male Bonding (band); Margot & the Nuclear So and So's; Oh My God (band); Parachute Musical; Phantogram (band); Pomegranates (band); Richard Buckner (musician); River City Extension; Royal Bangs; Seabird (band); Shonen Knife; stephaniesǐd; Surfer Blood; Ted Leo and the Pharmacists; Tom Tom Club; Tristen; Van Dyke Parks; Walk the Moon; and Wussy.

=== 2009 ===
This year's festival had approximately 280 showcases. The largest stage was at the Grammer's Tent. The Lite Brite Film Test was a film component in the Contemporary Arts Center. A major amenity was the Scion Streetcar. Anyone wearing a MidPoint wristband could hail down a Scion car that drove a loop near the various venues. Bands included several acts that went on to become much better known, including: Annie Rossi; Brighton, MA; Buffalo Killers; Chairlift (band); Deke Dickerson; Ed fROMOHIO or Ed Crawford; Early Day Miners; Ellery (duo); Geographer (band); God Made Me Funky; Hank & Cupcakes; Heartless Bastards; Jason Isbell and The 400 Unit; Kim Taylor; Lab Partners; Mia Carruthers; Micachu and the Shapes; Pomegranates (band); Sarah Borges; Shiny and the Spoon; The Dø; The Lighthouse and the Whaler; Scotland Yard Gospel Choir; Toy Horses; Vanity Theft; and Wussy.

== MidPoint Indie Summer Series ==
MidPoint Indie Summer is a free concert series produced by 3CDC and sponsored by MidPoint Music Festival. Hundreds to thousands gather for these all-ages events. Over the course of 14 weeks during the summer, MidPoint hosts a free concert each Friday night at Fountain Square in the heart of downtown.

The series began in 2009, showcasing national, regional, and local artists. Clap Your Hands Say Yeah, Local H, Betty Who, Those Darlins, Why?, Wussy, Art vs. Science, Margot & the Nuclear So and So's, Ha Ha Tonka, Camera Obscura, We Were Promised Jetpacks, and many others have headlined.
