= Fountain Square, Cincinnati =

City square in Ohio, United States

Fountain Square
- City square
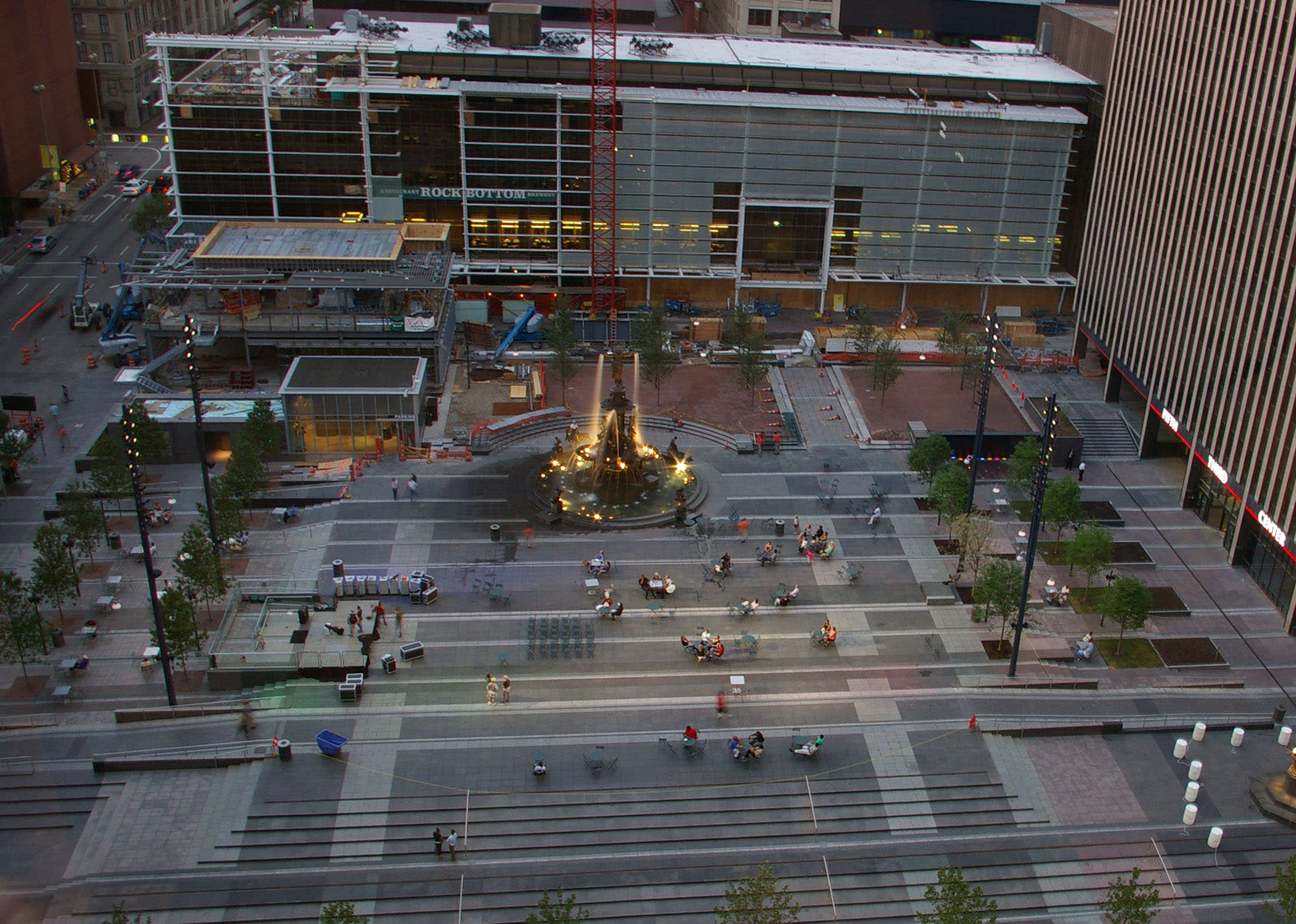
- Fountain Square during renovations in 2007
- Opened: 1871
- Location: 5th Street and Vine Street; Cincinnati, Ohio, United States
- Interactive map of Fountain Square
- Coordinates: 39°6′5.8″N 84°30′45″W
- Website: https://myfountainsquare.com/

Fountain Square is a city square in Cincinnati, Ohio, United States. Founded in 1871, it was renovated in 1971 and 2005 and currently features many shops, restaurants, hotels, and offices.

== History ==
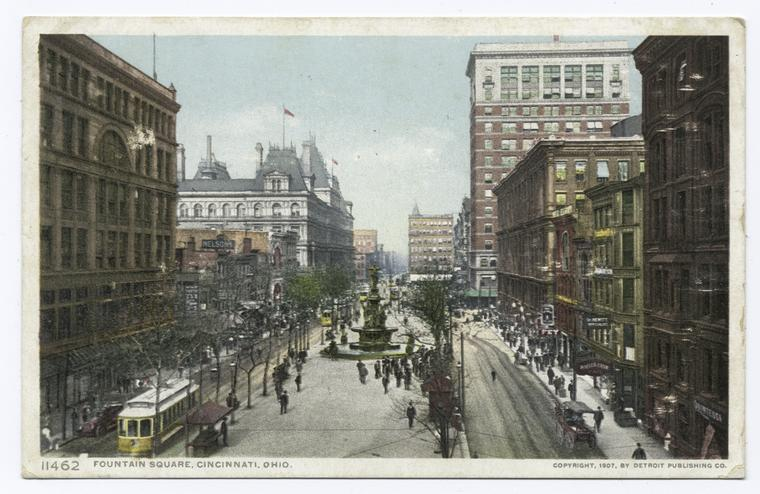
Fountain Square in 1907

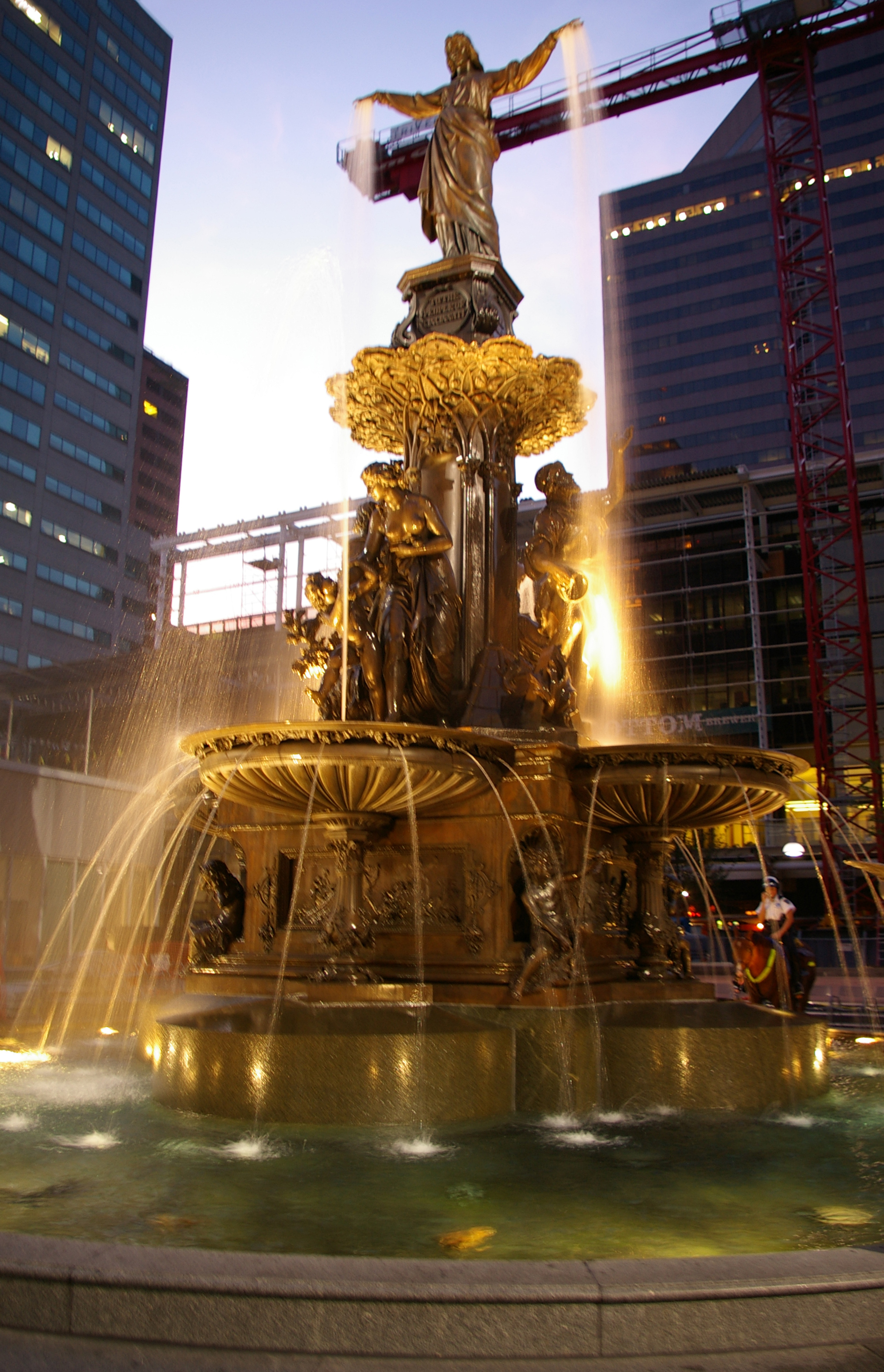
The Tyler Davidson Fountain is the centerpiece of Fountain Square.

An Indian mound stood at the present site of Fountain Square when the first white settlers arrived.

Fountain Square has been the symbolic center of Cincinnati since 1871. The square, which replaced a butcher's market, was a gift from Henry Probasco in memory of his business partner and brother-in-law, Tyler Davidson. Probasco traveled to Munich and commissioned a bronze allegorical fountain from Ferdinand von Miller named The Genius of Water. Originally, the square occupied a large island in the middle of Fifth Street with buildings to the north and south, much like nearby Piatt Park. A 1971 renovation of the square included slightly moving and re-orienting the fountain to the west, and enlarging the plaza by removing the original westbound portion of 5th Street and demolishing buildings to the north. It is used for lunch-breaks, rallies, and other gatherings.

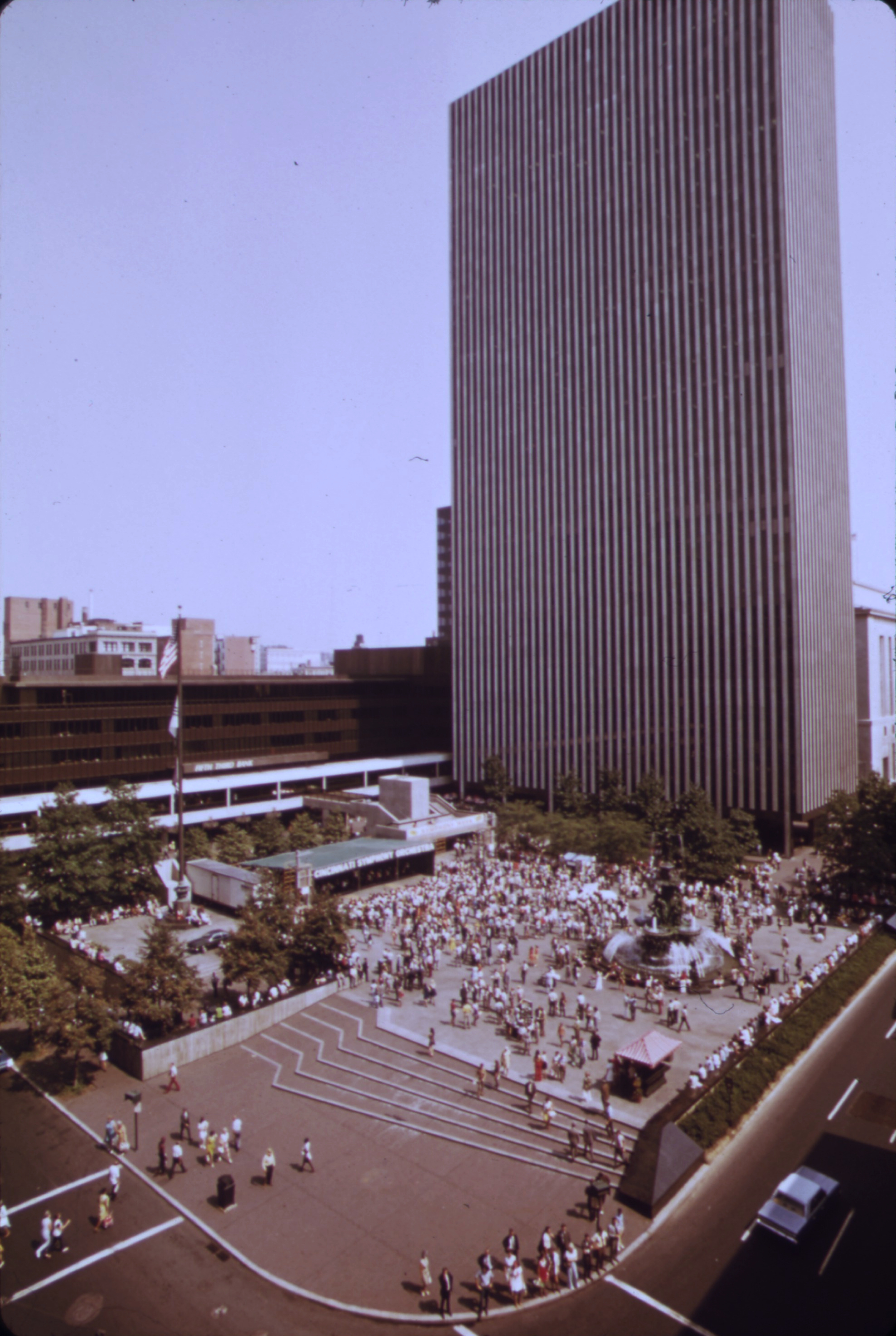
Fountain Square viewed from Carew Tower in 1970

In the early 2000s, the square was completely renovated and re-designed by 3CDC and BHDP Architecture (consulted by Cooper, Robertson & Partners and OLIN) to attract more visitors to the city, and to serve as a cultural/recreational hub for the city. In addition to the renovations, many buildings in and around the Fountain Square district are currently being renovated and redesigned. The Fountain itself was completely restored and moved to a more central location in the square.

== Tyler Davidson Fountain ==
After the death of his brother-in-law and business partner Tyler Davidson, Cincinnati businessman Henry Probasco went to Munich, Germany in search of a suitable memorial to him. Many years before, artist August von Kreling had collaborated with Ferdinand von Miller at the Royal Bronze Foundry of Bavaria to design a fountain. Probasco requested the addition of four figures with animals that would act as drinking fountains, which Miller's sons designed.

== Events ==
Fountain Square has many events all through the week including speeches, games, movies, concerts, giveaways, and festivals. The square also has many seasonal events such as Halloween on the square, the ice rink, Oktoberfest (largest outside of Germany) and more.

To celebrate the 40th anniversary of Earth Day 2010, the square featured "EcoSculpt 2010", an exhibit of sustainable art. The exhibit included "Atlas Recycled" by Tom Tsuchiya, a sculpture made of used atlases that doubled as a recycling receptacle for plastic bottles and aluminum cans.

Year	Headliners
2012	The Bright Light Social Hour, The Dynamites, The Seedy Seeds, Art vs Science, Psychodots, Lydia Loveless, Seabird, Ha Ha Tonka, Orgone, Bear Hands, Budos Band, Class Actress, Wussy
2013	Pomegranates, We Were Promised Jetpacks, Seabird, Loudmouth, Psychodots, Margot and The Nuclear So & So's, Plumb, Wussy, Brian Olive, The Seedy Seeds, Archer's Paradox, Belle Histoire, Drew Holcomb & The Neighbors, Why?
2014	Why?, Wussy, Betty Who, Those Darlins, Moon Taxi, Local H, Soledad Brothers, Wesley Bright & The Hi-Lites, Clap Your Hands Say Yeah, The Spiders, Man Man, The Nightbeast, Psychodots, Islands
2015	Surfer Blood, The Mowgli's, Kopecky Family Band, Buffalo Killers, Sloan, Red Wanting Blue, Saint Motel, The Ting Tings, Givers, The Whigs, Tweens, Judah & The Lion, San Fermin, Wussy, The World Is A Beautiful Place And I Am No Longer Afraid To Die
2016	The Werks, The Joy Formidable, Jessica Lea Mayfield, Kishi Bashi, Jukebox The Ghost, The Black Cadillacs, Guided By Voices, Robert DeLong, Reverend Horton Heat, Civil Twilight, Reverend Peyton's Big Damn Band, We Are Scientists, Swear and Shake, Cloud Cult
2017	Swear and Shake, Hippo Campus, Jeremy Enigk, Family & Friends, Mod Sun, The Bright Light Social Hour, Angelica Garcia, Clap Your Hands Say Yeah, Band of Heathens, Jacob Banks, Delta Rae, Stop Light Observations, Com Truise, Eric Nally
2018	Flor, Typhoon, Family & Friends, Clap Your Hands Say Yeah, Maps & Atlases, Red Wanting Blue, Vera Blue, Cowboy Mouth, Reverend Horton Heat, Delta Rae, Dave Hause and The Mermaid
2019	Public, Mad Anthony, The Band of Heathens, Erika Wennerstrom, Juice, Lauren Eylise, The Tillers, Cloud Nothings, Vesperteen, 500 Miles to Memphis

== Fountain Square District ==
The Fountain Square District is becoming a restaurant and entertainment hub. It contains many offices, hotels, specialty shops and restaurants.

Office

- Fifth Third Bank Headquarters
- Macy's, Inc.
- U.S. Bancorp
- Great American Insurance Group Headquarters
- Carew Tower — Art Deco hi-rise containing office space and a public observation deck

== See also ==
- Downtown Cincinnati
- Tyler Davidson Fountain
