= Pat Cassidy =

Film producer and music manager

- Born: August 28, 1985 (age 41); Neptune, New Jersey, United States
- Occupations: Film producer, Talent manager
- Years active: 2009–present

Pat Cassidy (born August 28, 1985) is an American independent film producer and music manager based in Austin, Texas.

He began his career in the entertainment business in 2001, starting a small punk and ska record label in his hometown of Herndon, Virginia. He produced the 2009 short horror film, Lullaby, striking a distribution deal with Fearnet. He produced the psychological horror-thriller film, House Hunting, which premiered at the 2012 Virginia Film Festival. He produced The Texas Chain Saw Massacre inspired script Butcher Boys for writer-producer Kim Henkel, the film premiered at the 2012 Fantasia Festival in Montreal. In 2013 he produced the indie-thriller, Two Step, for director Alex Johnson, the film premiered at the SXSW film festival to positive reviews from Variety and Indiewire.

Cassidy previously managed the Austin, Texas-based Indie pop band Wild Child, and currently manages Whiskey Shivers, Ben Kweller, Trinidad James, Pup Punk, and Holiday Mountain. Cassidy is also a co-host of the daily news podcast, Hard Factor.

== Personal life ==
Cassidy's father was first cousin with David Cassidy making him his first cousin once removed. His great aunt is Shirley Jones. Cassidy attended Herndon High School and James Madison University, with longtime friend Eric Sollenberger, whom he later worked at Barstool Sports with.
