= Dawg Yawp =

American indie folk band

- Origin: Cincinnati, OH, United States
- Genres: Folktronica, psychedelic folk, indie folk
- Years active: 2015–2023
- Label: Old Flame Records
- Members: Tyler Randall; Rob Keenan
- Website: dawgyawp.com

Dawg Yawp was an American indie folk band based in Cincinnati, Ohio. The group consisted of members Tyler Randall and Rob Keenan. Dawg Yawp’s music is known for melding intricate harmonies and unique instrumentation, including Randall’s sitar, which is amplified and played while standing, and the use of electronic synthesis, samples and drum beats.

== History ==
=== 2006–2014: Beginning, College ===
In 2006, Tyler Randall and Rob Keenan became friends while both attending Turpin High School. After graduating, Keenan spent three years at Indiana University while Randall finished high school. During their time apart, Randall and Keenan would collaborate on music over the weekends. After Randall graduated from high school, he attended Berklee College of Music in Boston, MA. Keenan soon joined Randall as a student at Berklee, although both eventually dropped out to focus on their musical careers. While attending Berklee, Randall was the first student to have sitar as their principal instrument.

During his time at Berklee, Randall experimented with the sitar in genres such as free improvisation, Middle Eastern fusion, jazz, and American roots. He began busking in the subways and on the streets. Randall also became active in the electronic underground music scene and hosted events. Randall cofounded an underground electronic music collective known as ElecSonic, for which Keenan helped produce events. Keenan departed ElecSonic to focus on songwriting. Randall eventually departed ElecSonic to focus on his own music, and has collaborated with Phonoride, Sonnymoon, Time Wharp, Teebs, The Gaslamp Killer, Gonjasufi and Kaytranada.

After leaving Berklee, Randall and Keenan relocated to Chicago, Illinois, then Nederland, Colorado, to focus on writing music. The two eventually found their way back to Newport, Kentucky, located directly across the river from their native Cincinnati, Ohio. During this time the members would conceive Dawg Yawp.

=== 2015: Dawg Yawp Formation, Two Hearted EP ===
In Cincinnati, Randall and Keenan worked together at a local waffle restaurant, Taste of Belgium. While employed, the two played their first show as Dawg Yawp, covering The Beatles and performing acoustically on the floor of the restaurant. After hearing the duo perform, Rob Fetters offered to produce their debut album. Fetters became a mentor to the band during their recording process. The first six of these recordings were released as the Two Hearted EP on May 6, 2015.

=== 2016: Development, Team, Dawg Yawp LP ===
After receiving local praise for the Two Hearted EP, described as “one of the most original and intricately considered bands in Cincinnati’s musical history,” Dawg Yawp began to tour the Midwest and gain support. The band went back into the studio with Fetters to record new material over the course of several sessions. Two of these tracks were released as standalone singles, including “East Virginia Blues” on April 12, 2016 via NPR’s All Songs Considered. A second single, “Can’t Think” premiered via Consequence of Sound on April 28, 2016, describing the band as “completely original” and dubbing them “sitar rock”.

Both tracks, along with four tracks from the Two Hearted EP (“I Wanna Be A Dawg,” “Not So Sure,” “Need You to Know,” and “Dawg”) were combined with several unreleased tracks for the self-titled LP Dawg Yawp, which was released on October 14, 2016, via Old Flame Records, with a premiere from PopMatters. A music video for “Can’t Think” was directed by Dave Morrison and released on Team Coco on February 8, 2017 as a part of their “Fresh Noise” series.

=== 2017: NPR: Tiny Desk ===
NPR featured Dawg Yawp’s track “I’ll Quit Tomorrow” on “The Austin 100” playlist ahead of SXSW 2017. After catching a set at the festival, Bob Boilen invited Dawg Yawp to record a Tiny Desk Concert. The session was recorded on June 28, 2017, and was released on September 29, 2017.

Dawg Yawp have performed at Midpoint Music Festival (2015), Bunbury Music Festival (2016), Whispering Beard Folk Festival (2016), Moonshiner’s Ball (2015 & 16), River Roots Festival (2016), South By Southwest (2017) and the Des Moines Arts Festival (2017).

Dawg Yawp recorded a World Cafe Live session in December 2016, which was released on January 9, 2017. NPR has featured the band in their Heavy Rotation: 10 Songs Public Radio Can’t Stop Playing.

=== 2018: Dawg Yawp: Doubles, Vol. 1 ===
In September 2018, Dawg Yawp released two singles released together called “Tearin’ Up” and “Why I’m Here” entitled ‘Dawg Yawp Doubles, Vol. 1’.

== Discography ==
- Two Hearted EP (5/6/15, Independent)
- “East Virginia Blues” (Single) (4/12/16, Old Flame Records)
- “Can’t Think” (Single) (4/28/16, Old Flame Records)
- Dawg Yawp LP (10/14/16, Old Flame Records)
- Dawg Yawp: Doubles, Vol. 1 (Doubles)
  - “Tearin’ Up” (Single) (2018, Old Flame Records)
  - “Why I’m Here” (Single) (2018, Old Flame Records)
