= Santah =

American indie rock band

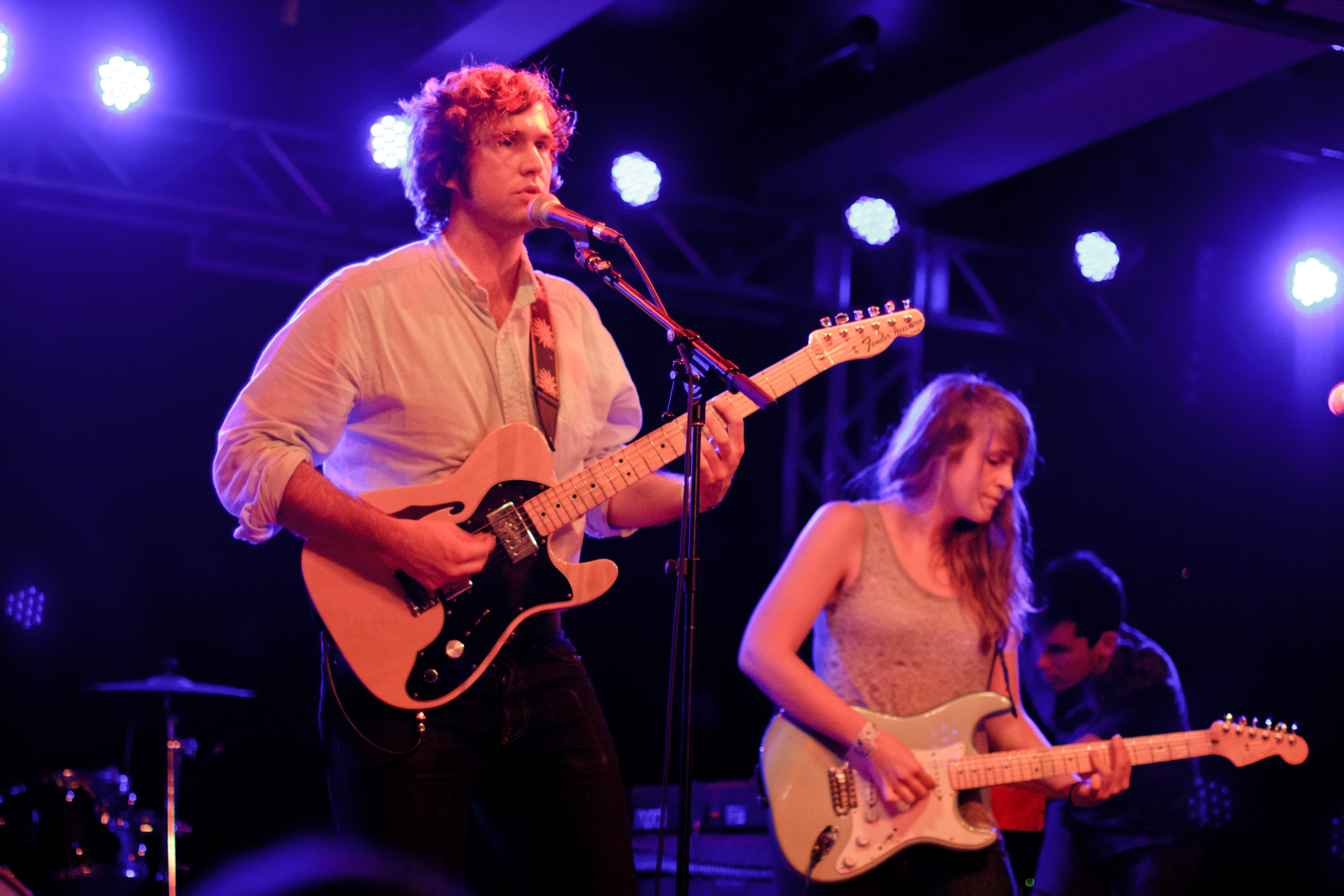
- Stanton and Vivian McConnell performing with Santah in Chicago, 2012

Background information
- Origin: Urbana, Illinois, U.S.
- Genres: Indie rock, alternative rock
- Years active: 2006–2017, 2025–present
- Labels: No Sleep Records, saki, Yes Club
- Members: Stanton McConnell (guitar, vocals); Vivian McConnell (guitar, vocals); Steve Plock (drums, vocals); Tommy Trafton (pianos, synths); Mike Winegardner (bass, vocals); Rico Vigil (touring member)
- Past members: Mack McConnell (guitar); Otto Stuparitz (bass)
- Website: santahmusic.com

Santah is an American indie rock band formed in Urbana, Illinois, and later based in Chicago. Fronted by the sibling singer-guitarists Stanton and Vivian McConnell, the band has released the studio albums White Noise Bed (2010), Chico (2015), and Last Whirlpool (2025), along with several EPs and singles. White Noise Bed was recorded at Pieholden Suite Sound, the studio of the former Wilco member Jay Bennett, and was reissued nationally by No Sleep Records in 2011. The band played a farewell show in 2017 and reunited in 2025.

== History ==
=== Formation and White Noise Bed (2006–2011) ===
Santah began in 2006 under the name "Santa", founded by singer-guitarist Stanton McConnell and his cousin, guitarist Mack McConnell, after the pair had played open-mic nights as a duo while attending the University of Illinois Urbana-Champaign. Stanton and his sister Vivian grew up in Dixon, Illinois; Stanton and drummer Steve Plock had played music together in high school, and Plock joined Santa following earlier lineup changes. Bassist Otto Stuparitz met Stanton through the Champaign-Urbana music scene, and later introduced keyboardist Tommy Trafton to the group.

The group released its second EP, My Bones, in 2008. Stanton said that he and Mack chose the original name partly because it did not suggest a particular style of music, and noted that santa is Spanish for "saint". The band began spelling the name "Santah" around the time recording began on its debut album; the added letter helped distinguish the group from Santa Claus. In a 2016 interview, the band described Santah as a nondenominational version of its namesake, with a spiritual and open-ended meaning. Mack played his final show with the band in May 2010, while Vivian, who had begun playing with Santah that February, was not involved in the recording of White Noise Bed.

The band recorded White Noise Bed with producer Matt DeWine at Pieholden Suite Sound, the studio owned by the former Wilco member Jay Bennett, in the months following Bennett's death in 2009. The sessions favored an analog approach and made use of instruments and equipment left at the studio. Santah self-released the album on May 6, 2010, and played a release show at the Canopy Club in Urbana. In interviews, the band described it as a break-up record, "trying to understand the separation between two people, the journey of two people from point A to... where ever it went." The band performed at the CMJ Music Marathon in New York in October 2010. After signing with No Sleep Records, Santah reissued the album nationally on June 7, 2011. Reviewing the album in the Chicago Reader, Miles Raymer wrote that the band succeeded with 1970s-style California psychedelic pop because it tapped into the style's "darker undercurrents". Santah played hundreds of shows across the United States in support of the album, and later relocated to Chicago.

=== You're Still a Lover and "Awwh Man" (2012–2014) ===
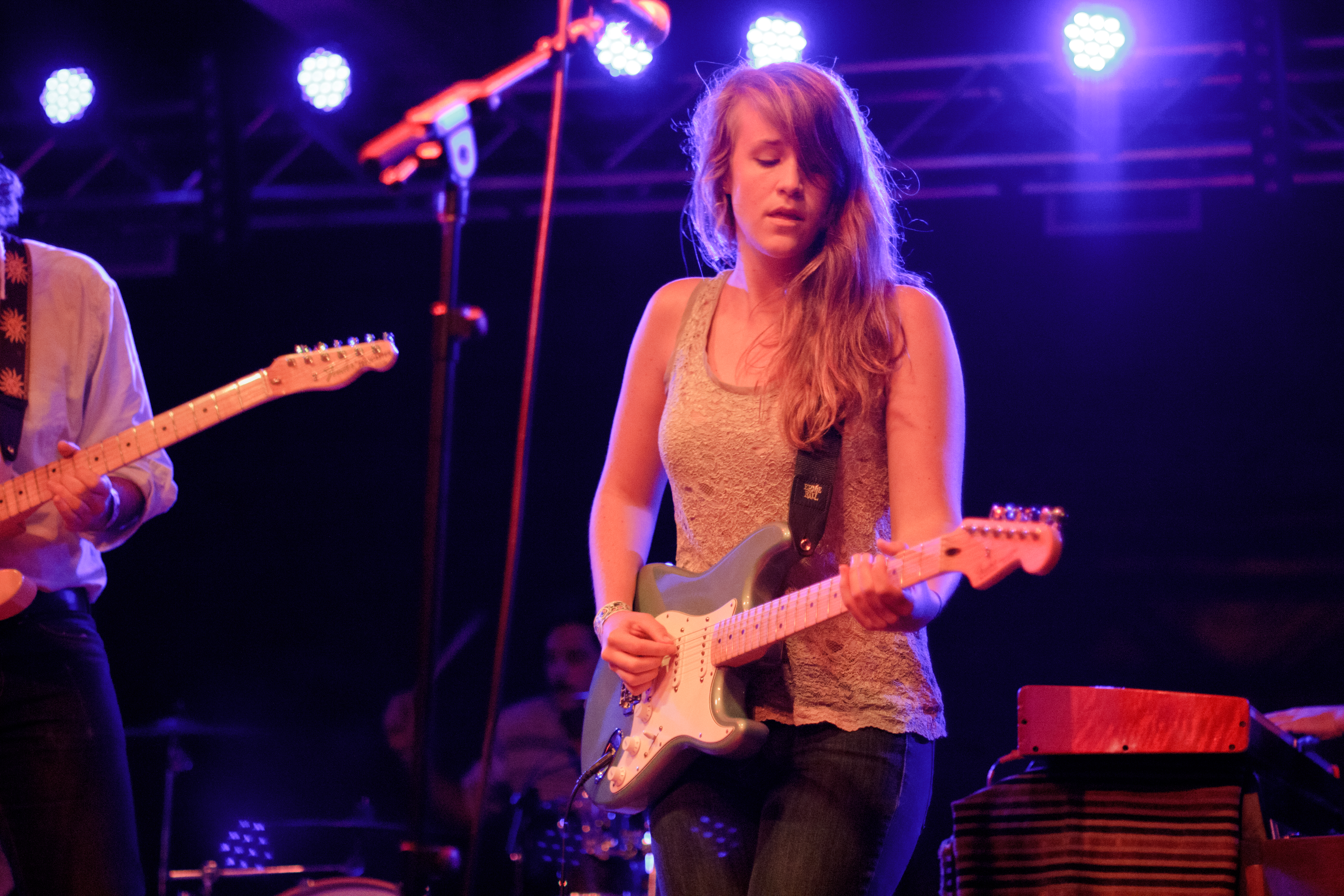
Vivian McConnell performing with Santah in Chicago, August 2012

Santah released the five-song EP You're Still a Lover on October 16, 2012, led by the single "Springfield". The EP drew partly on songs the band had developed live while touring behind White Noise Bed. The Chicago record store saki issued the EP on vinyl on November 6, 2012, in an edition of 500 copies distributed by Carrot Top, with an additional vinyl-only track, "Olive Olive". The band marked the release with two Chicago shows, appearing at Township with Savoir Adore and Royal Canoe and at the Burlington with Psychic Twin and Brother George, and toured North America that month, including three CMJ Music Marathon showcases.

In 2014, Santah contributed a cover of David Bowie's "Five Years", a song featured in the film The Life Aquatic with Steve Zissou, to the Wes Anderson tribute album I Saved Latin!, released by American Laundromat Records. That May, the band self-released the seven-inch single "Awwh Man", backed with "Won't Be Long Now", in an edition of 150 copies. Santah presented the single as a first preview of its planned second album, with what the band described as a "thicker, stickier" sound.

=== Chico and farewell (2014–2017) ===
In November 2014, Santah launched a PledgeMusic campaign to fund the completion of its second album, for which the band had recorded more than 20 songs, with a portion of proceeds designated for the Chicago anti-violence organization CeaseFire. The band again recorded at Pieholden Suite Sound. Chico was released on November 6, 2015, through Yes Club Records, and Santah played a release show at Lincoln Hall on November 20. Ben Niespodziany of These Days rated the album 8.5 out of 10, describing its tracks as "catchy yet psychedelic".

In March 2016, the band released the six-track EP Who's in Town?. Santah played what was presented as a final farewell show in September 2017, performing while floating down the Chicago River into Lake Michigan. Vivian McConnell subsequently began performing as a solo artist under the name V.V. Lightbody, and released her debut album in 2018.

=== Reunion and Last Whirlpool (2024–2025) ===
In August 2025, Santah announced its return with Last Whirlpool, the band's first album in ten years, recorded over a long weekend in the summer of 2024. The album was released on October 31, 2025. The band played reunion shows that November in St. Joseph, Michigan, Urbana, and Chicago, including a hometown release show at the Rose Bowl Tavern in Urbana with V.V. Lightbody among the supporting acts.

== Members ==
- Stanton McConnell – guitar, vocals
- Vivian McConnell – guitar, vocals
- Steve Plock – drums, vocals
- Tommy Trafton – keyboards, synthesizers
- Mike Winegardner – bass, vocals
- Rico Vigil – touring member

Former members

- Mack McConnell – guitar
- Otto Stuparitz – bass

== Discography ==
Studio albums

- White Noise Bed (self-released, 2010; No Sleep Records, 2011)
- Chico (Yes Club Records, 2015)
- Last Whirlpool (2025)

EPs

- My Bones (self-released as Santa, 2008)
- You're Still a Lover (saki, 2012)
- Who's in Town? (2016)

Singles

- "Awwh Man" / "Won't Be Long Now" (2014)
