= Twentieth Century Theatre =

- 20th Century Theater
- U.S. National Register of Historic Places
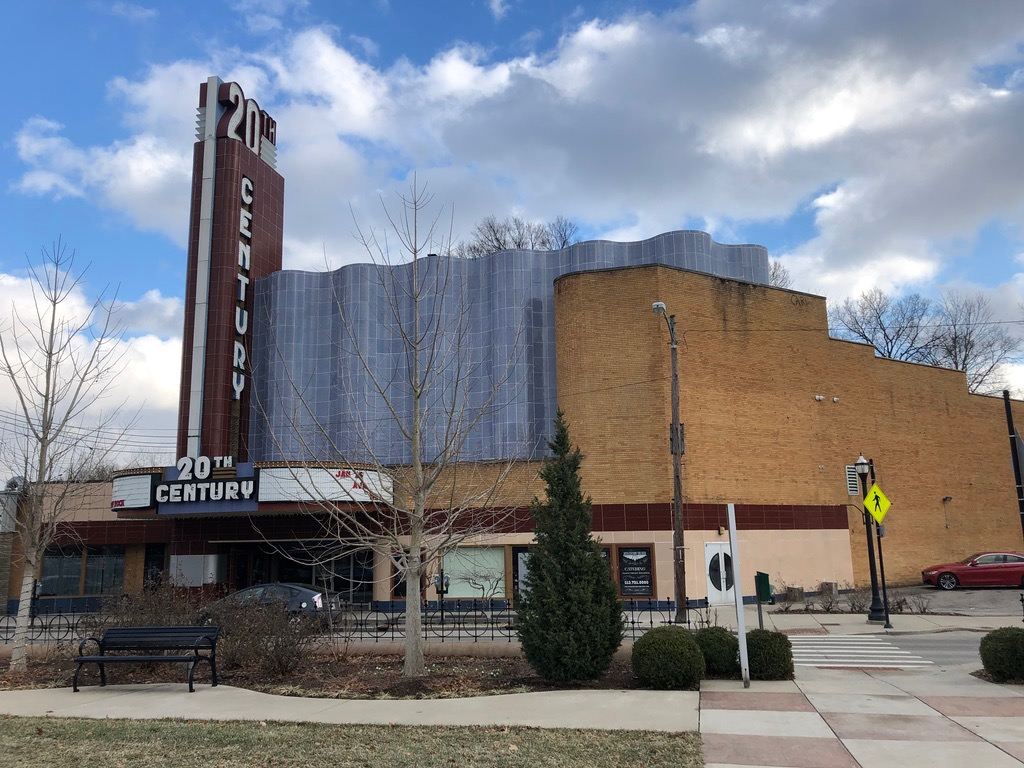
- The theater in 2019
- Location: 3021 Madison Rd., Cincinnati, Ohio
- Coordinates: 39°9′4.14″N 84°25′58.98″W
- Architect: F & W Construction and Fred W. Stritzel
- Architectural style: Moderne
- NRHP reference No.: 93000879
- Added to NRHP: August 26, 1993

Twentieth Century Theater is a registered historic building in the Oakley neighborhood of Cincinnati, Ohio, listed in the National Register on August 26, 1993. It is located at 3021 Madison Road. Built in 1941 as a deluxe neighborhood movie theater, it currently functions as a mixed use venue for special events and concerts.
