= Joseph Nevels =

American singer-songwriter

- Born: Florence, Kentucky
- Genres: Soul; Indie R&B

Joseph Nevels (formerly known as JSPH) is an American singer, songwriter, and lawyer. His music blends elements of soul and indie R&B and has received recognition from Rolling Stone, NPR, Netflix, and Oprah Winfrey's Queen Sugar.

== Early life ==
Nevels was born in Florence, Kentucky. He played football at Simon Kenton High School and later enrolled at the University of Kentucky, where his athletic career ended following a concussion injury. He subsequently attended Florida International University in Miami before returning to Kentucky. Nevels graduated from the Salmon P. Chase College of Law at Northern Kentucky University with a Juris Doctor degree.

== Career ==
Rolling Stone named Nevels an "Artist You Need To Know" in their article entitled, "Joseph Nevels Is Making Smooth R&B – And Big Career Moves". They featured his single "Alive" and described him as a "rising artist from Kentucky leveraging his background in music business and law to carve out his own background".

Nevels previously released music under the stage name JSPH. His single "Breathe" was featured on Pharrell Williams' OTHERtone Playlist on Apple Music's Beats1 Radio. where it charted in the international top 5.

Nevels gained further attention when his song "ComeMyWay" was featured on the Netflix Series On My Block. The soundtrack also featured artists H.E.R., Brent Faiyaz and Russ and was acclaimed by Newsweek. His songs have also appeared on Queen Sugar produced by Ava DuVernay and Oprah Winfrey.

NPR Music spotlighted Nevels single "lifeLESS" and described his style as "experimental soul with an accessibility that will make him a hit among casual listeners and critics."
