= Parachute Musical =

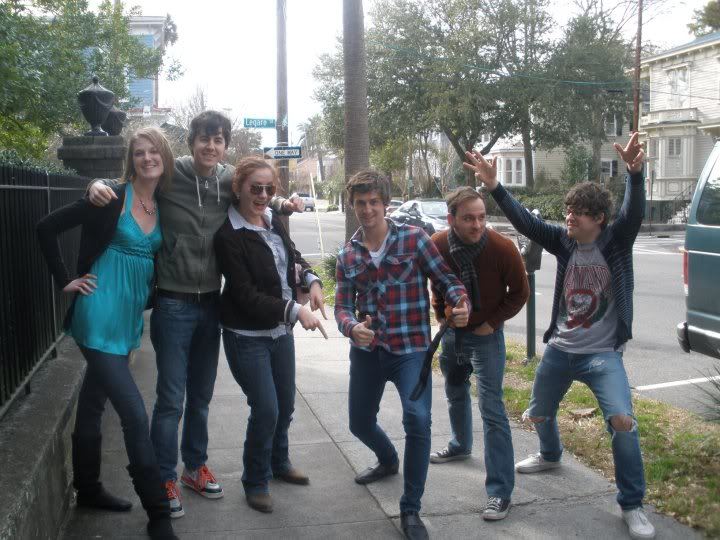
- Band members of Parachute Musical and friends

Background information
- Origin: Washington, D.C., United States
- Genres: Rock, pop, indie rock, piano rock
- Years active: 2005–2012
- Members: Josh Foster; Tom Gilbert; Andrew Samples; Ben Jacoby
- Past members: Matt Dowling; Kyle Cornett
- Website: http://parachutemusical.com/

Parachute Musical is an American rock band formed in 2005 in Washington, D.C. The band was primarily based in Nashville, TN until breaking up in 2012. Parachute Musical is composed of Josh Foster (vocals, piano), Tom Gilbert (guitar, backing vocals), Andrew Samples (bass, backing vocals) and Ben Jacoby (drums).

== Early days ==
Foster and Gilbert grew up in Olney, MD and met in the 6th grade. During their high school years, the two played together in the school jazz band. Gilbert and Jacoby (a Silver Spring, MD native) met while working at Chuck Levin's Washington Music Center in Wheaton, MD. Jacoby grew up touring with The American Originals Fife and Drum Corps. The three formed Parachute Musical in 2005 along with bassist Matt Dowling (now of the Washington, D.C. based Deleted Scenes). The band played their earliest shows at Washington, D.C. venues The Grog & Tankard, The Velvet Lounge and Black Cat.

== Parachute Musical and relocation to Nashville, TN (2005–2007) ==
The band's first release, Parachute Musical, was recorded in 2005 as an American University student's recording project. After its release, Jacoby and Gilbert left the band and moved from DC; Jacoby to Milwaukee, WI, and Gilbert to Murfreesboro, TN to attend Middle Tennessee State University. Foster struggled to maintain the band with various line up changes while he completed his jazz guitar performance degree at American University, resulting in the band's temporary breakup. Inspired by a Jamie Cullum concert at the 9:30 Club in Washington, D.C., Foster relocated to Nashville, TN in February 2007 to regroup the band with Gilbert. Jacoby soon followed. Once in Nashville, the band enlisted Gilbert's friend Kyle Cornett as bass player. Parachute Musical immediately began performing in Nashville and touring regionally in the Southeast and Northeast.

== Everything Is Working Out Fine In Some Town LP (2008–2009) ==
On June 19, 2008 Parachute Musical released a 10-track album entitled Everything Is Working Out Fine In Some Town, produced and engineered by Nashville-based indie producer Derek Garten. The conceptualization and recording process for the album was over a year in length. The album features layered orchestral segments scored by Foster. Lyrically, the album deals with the collapse of Foster's engagement and struggles with his family. A repeating note theme appears three times throughout the album; in the opening title track, during "Flashback `83", and after the last track, "Stranger Things". The album was heralded as "one of the most elaborate and expansive pieces the local independent rock scene has produced in recent memory" by local Nashville paper, All The Rage '.

The track "One More Song" was used on the E! Entertainment Television show Kourtney & Khloe Take Miami (Season 2, Episode 9) on Sunday, August 9, 2010.

The track "Instead" was used on MTV's The Real World (Season 24, Episode 11) on Wednesday, September 8, 2010.

Everything Is Working Out Fine In Some Town was released in Japan on This Time Records on August 18, 2010. The Japanese release contains the No Comfort single and "Little Did You Know" as bonus tracks.

Parachute Musical toured throughout 2008 and 2009 in support of Everything Is Working Out Fine In Some Town, co-headlining tours with Modern Skirts, Heypenny, All Get Out, The Winter Sounds, Keegan DeWitt and Wakey!Wakey!.

Kyle Cornett left the band in May 2009, and was replaced by bass player and Tennessee native Andrew Samples (Feable Weiner, Mondo Primo).

== Touring & No Comfort Single (2010) ==
Parachute Musical released a two-song single on January 8, 2010, entitled No Comfort and began another tour with Sequoyah Prep School. For No Comfort, Parachute Musical collaborated again with producer Derek Garten. A music video was released for the track "Drop Me A Line" on March 30, 2010.

In April and May 2010, Parachute Musical embarked on West Side Toury, a five-week tour of the West Coast with Athens, GA based The Winter Sounds.

On August 3, 2010 the band released a track called Little Did You Know, featuring pedal steel guitar player Russ Pahl (Elton John, Willie Nelson). Parachute Musical changed up instruments to record the song, with Samples on keys, Gilbert on Bass, Foster on guitar and Jacoby on drums. The track was released for free via the band's website.

== Kill It Cut It Down (2010–2011) ==
Parachute Musical announced on August 5, 2010 that they would be taking some time off the road to prepare a third full-length record.

Utilizing the website Kickstarter, the band began a fundraiser in September 2010 in an effort to raise the funds necessary to record their next album. By the end of the campaign on November 9, 2010, Parachute Musical fans had raised a total of $16,705.

In a press release on December 22, 2010, the band announced they would be working with producer Jim Wirt (Incubus, Fiona Apple, The Rocket Summer, Jack's Mannequin) on a new full-length record. The band recorded in Cleveland, OH over January, 2011 which they've since described as "the coldest month of [their] lives." In a December 2010 article on Sinizine.net, Foster said “[People] should expect a new, more mature group of songs ... [It will remain] emotive, still fun, but more rockin’.”

Parachute Musical released a two-song single called New Love on Valentines Day, 2011. The single contains the tracks "New Love" (featuring the horn section from the Richmond, VA-based Murphy's Kids) and "380427". These songs had been recorded in August 2010.

On May 9, 2011, Parachute Musical announced the title of their new full-length record, Kill It Cut It Down.

On August 23, 2011, the band released Kill It Cut It Down on their website for $2, which increased by $1 a day until reaching $10. According to the band's website, the phrase Kill It Cut It Down means "the abandonment of old ways; leaving behind the safe and familiar to embrace something new." Blogger JrzyGyrl.com called the record "a logical and welcome progression from 2008′s Everything Is Working Out Fine In Some Town." Musically, the band has "[left] behind the piano heavy ballad tracks that made up most of their first album, and replaced them with more guitars" creating their own version of "aggressive-but-bright pop-rock."

Parachute Musical set out on tour in support of Kill It Cut It Down in the Fall of 2011, co-headlining with Elsinore and fellow Nashvillian Kyle Andrews.

== Break Up ==
On March 5, 2012, Parachute Musical announced on their blog that they would be ending the band. In an excerpt from the post, "The past 7+ years have been some of the greatest moments of our lives, but at the same time, we all feel that this chapter has come to a close. We’re ready to try new things, go new places, see where life takes us." The breakup was on friendly terms, as the band stated "we're brothers and will continue to be."

Parachute Musical played their last show on Friday, March 30, 2012 at The 5 Spot in Nashville, TN.

== Discography ==
=== LPs ===
- Parachute Musical (2005)
- Everything Is Working Out Fine In Some Town (June 19, 2008)
- Kill It Cut It Down (August 23, 2011)

=== EPs ===
- Seasons Greetings (December, 2008)

=== Singles ===
- No Comfort [2-song single] (January 8, 2010)
- Little Did You Know (August 3, 2010)
- New Love [2-song single] (February 14, 2011)
