= Cabin (band) =

American rock band

CABIN
- Origin: Louisville, Kentucky, U.S.
- Genres: Indie Rock, Alternative rock, Neo-psych
- Years active: 2005–present
- Labels: Machine Records
- Members: Noah Hewett-Ball; Sarah Hewett-Ball (née Welder); Shane Thomas; Zack Kennedy; Charlie Rivera
- Website: CABINwebsite.com

Cabin (stylized as CABIN) is an American indie/melodic rock band that formed in Louisville, Kentucky.

== History ==
After earning a degree as a visual artist, founding member Noah Hewett-Ball began writing music as a soundtrack to accompany a series of paintings. Attempting to visually convey the colors, textures, and rhythm of music, Noah eventually found music taking reign of his creative endeavors. In 2005, he teamed up with three high school friends to record Cabin's first full-length album, Govern The Good Life. Over the next three years, the band went through a series of changes in their original line up and emerged as a more dynamic unit. The addition of experimental violinist and pianist, Sarah Beth Welder, led to the creation of Cabin's latest album, Among The Rectangles And Changeable Parts, released in late 2010. The record takes its listener on a sonic journey weaving back and forth between the lines of progressive rock and pop. The lyrics cleverly pin up pundits, not politics, and provide a social commentary on consumerism written in the prose of advertising. The music draws the listener into an imagined world, only to have the lyrics turn the attention back toward an inescapable reality.

Second only to writing and creating new music, Cabin cites the opportunity to travel and share their music with others as their reason for existing. Through bloggers and word of mouth, Cabin has earned fans worldwide, performing in seven European countries to date and sharing the stage with acclaimed musicians such as OK Go, Spoon, and members of My Morning Jacket. Paired with their impressive touring resume, Cabin garners more attention with the release of each new album. Govern The Good Life and Among The Rectangles And Changeable Parts each earned Album of the Year from WFPK Radio Louisville and also landed both the #1 and #38 spots on the Top 100 countdown for the year. Spin magazine noted the song "I Was Here" as 'must hear' song in 2009 and singer-songwriter Sufjan Stevens labeled Cabin as "a band you need to check out".

== Band members ==
- Noah Hewett-Ball – vocals, keyboard, guitar
- Sarah Beth Hewett-Ball (née Welder) – violin, keyboard, vocals
- Shane Thomas – bass guitar
- Charlie Rivera- guitar
- Zack Kennedy – drums / percussion

== Previous members ==
- Doug Dallmann
- Dave Chale – drums
- Billy Lease – bass, guitar
- James Hewett
- Jake Huestis

== Discography ==
=== Albums ===
- Govern The Good Life (2005)
- Among The Rectangles and Changeable Parts (2010)
- It Is What It Looks Like (2013)

=== EPs ===
- I Was Here (2007)
