= Swear and Shake =

American indie folk band

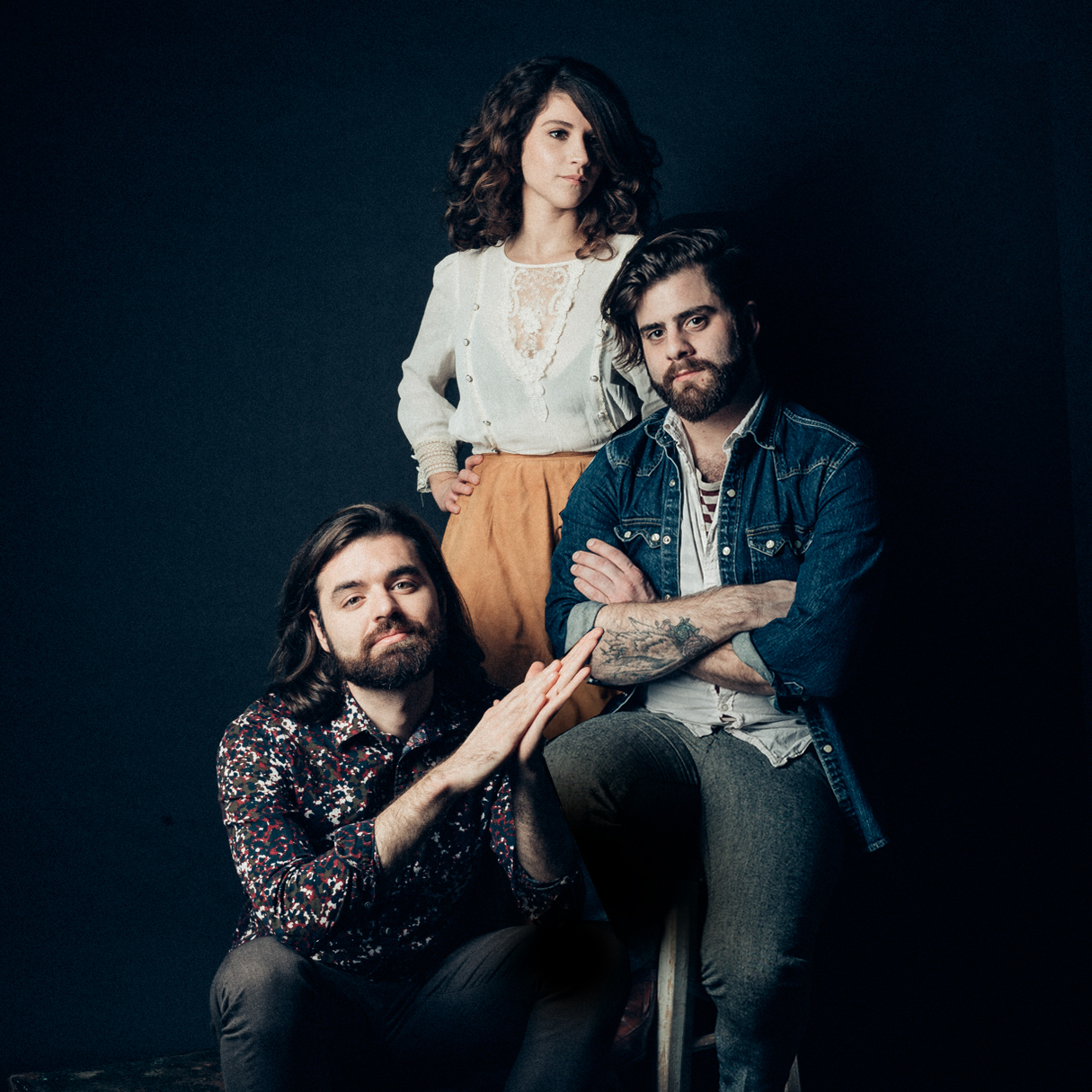
- Swear and Shake in 2016

Background information
- Origin: New York City, New York, US
- Genres: Indie folk
- Years active: 2010–2017
- Past members: Kari Spieler; Adam McHeffey; Shaun Savage; Tom Elefante

Swear and Shake was an American indie folk band from New York City. Formed in 2010 by Kari Spieler (vocals, guitar) and Adam McHeffey (vocals, guitar, banjo), the band also included bassist Shaun Savage and drummer Tom Elefante. They released two EPs and two studio albums, before breaking up in 2017.

== History ==
Swear and Shake was formed in 2010 in New York City by singer and guitarist Kari Spieler and guitar/banjo player Adam McHeffey. They were joined by bassist Shaun Savage and drummer Tom Elefante. The same year, they released the EP Extended Play and followed it two years later with their debut full-length album, Maple Ridge. The Blue Indian named them Band of the Month in December 2012. Time Out described their sound as "postcard-perfect indie folk with an undercurrent of sly humor". The band self-identified their sound as "big hook Americana".

In 2016, Swear and Shake issued their second studio album, The Sound of Letting Go. The band broke up a year later.

== Band members ==
- Kari Spieler – vocals, guitar (2010–2017)
- Adam McHeffey – vocals, guitar, banjo (2010–2017)
- Shaun Savage – bass (2010–2017)
- Tom Elefante – drums (2010–2012)

== Discography ==
Studio albums

- Maple Ridge (2012)
- The Sound of Letting Go (2016)

EPs

- Extended Play (2010)
- Ain't That Lovin' (2014)

Singles

- "For Better, for Worse" (2011)
- "Be Your Strength" (2013)
- "Christmas Is You" (2016)
- "Tear Us Apart" (2017)
