= Vanity Theft =

American indie/alternative rock group

- Origin: Springboro, Ohio, USA
- Genres: Alternative rock, indie rock
- Years active: 2005–2015
- Labels: Vigilante, Adamant
- Past members: Alicia Grodecki; Brittany Hill; Elyse Driskill; Staci Farfsing; Lindsey Keene; Lalaine

Vanity Theft was an American all-female indie/alternative rock group from Springboro, Ohio, that was formed in 2005.

== Biography ==
The band started in 2005 as "Vanity Pledge" when the members were still in high school, and was made up of Brittany Hill (guitar, vocals), Alicia Grodecki (keyboard, vocals), Elyse Driskill (drums) and Staci Farfsing (bass guitar). Originally playing cover material, the band started to write and play original music after Lindsey Keene replaced the college-bound Farfsing on bass guitar and the group was renamed "Vanity Theft".

Keene left the band to pursue schooling and was replaced on bass guitar shortly after its second album was completed in April 2010 by Lalaine, previously best known for her role in the early 2000s on the TV show Lizzie McGuire. Lalaine was asked to leave in January 2011 just before touring was to resume and the band consisted of its three original founding members. It has since toured with Amanda Dellevigne, Kelly Riot and, on The Lady Killers Tour, Allison Kelly.

The band was described by some early Ohio reports as having a sound "somewhere between the work of Sleater-Kinney and the Ting Tings".

In 2010, the band signed with Vigilante Music/Adamant Records.

On February 23, 2015, Hill announced the official disbandment of the band, also announcing her new music project "Kerchief". Shortly after, Grodecki announced her own music project titled "Moira".

== Members ==
Final line-up

- Elyse Driskill - drums (2005–2015)
- Alicia Grodecki - lead vocals, keyboards, synthesizers, programming, piano, harmonica, guitars (2005–2015), bass guitar (2012–2015)
- Brittany Hill - lead guitar, backing vocals (2005–2015)

Former members

- Staci Farfsing - bass guitar (2005)
- Lindsey Keene - bass guitar (2006–2010)
- Lalaine - bass guitar, backing vocals (2010)
- Amanda Dellevigne - bass guitar (2011)
- Kelly Riot - bass guitar (2011)
- Allison Kelly - bass guitar (2012)

== Discography ==
- Symptoms (2006) (5 song CD-EP)
- Post Script: Pace Yourself (2008)
- Anatomy (EP) (2010)
- Get What You Came For (2011) (Vigilante/Adamant)
- The Right Amount of Distance (2012) (7 song CD-EP)

== Web shows ==
- Vanity Theft: VT Tour Diary (2011)
- Vanity Theft: The Lost Tapes (2012)
