= Mike Oberst =

- Born: January 14, 1982 (age 44); Cincinnati, Ohio, United States
- Origin: Cincinnati, Ohio
- Genres: Americana, folk, old-time
- Occupations: Musician, singer-songwriter
- Instruments: Vocals guitar banjo fiddle harmonica
- Years active: 2000–present
- Label: Reggieville Records
- Website: mikeoberst.com

Mike Oberst is an American multinstrumentalist, musician, artist and songwriter based in Cincinnati, Ohio, who performs solo and as a member of the band, The Tillers, which he co-founded. As a solo artist he has released two albums (Mike Oberst and His Five-String Banjo and Six Feet of Earth) and appeared as a guest on Jean Dowell's album, A Place Way Back in Time, which he produced. Additionally, The Tillers have released five studio albums and one concert album. They have performed internationally, including shows with Pokey LaFarge, Justin Townes Earle, Jerry Douglas, Iris Dement, Rev. Horton Heat, Doc Watson, Taj Mahal, Guy Clark, The Hackensaw Boys, Country Joe Mcdonald, Th' Legendary Shack Shakers, Dex Romweber, Rev. Peyton's Big Damn Band, The Dirt Daubers and more. Band member Joe Macheret has described their style as a mix of various American Folk styles with pieces of Bluegrass and bits of Jazz and Blues.

== History ==
Mike Oberst was born in Cincinnati, Ohio, where he started taking piano lessons at the age of four. At 13, he learned a few guitar chords from his father and within a year he began performing with friends with whom he later formed local punk rock bands Disarm and The Resurgence.

Oberst's musical interest shifted to folk music when he joined the Cincinnati Caledonian Bagpipe and Drum Corps from ages 17 to 22. At 23, he joined The Blue Rock Boys, an Irish Traditional Folk band, and began touring for the first time.

Oberst went solo in 2007, performing locally and abroad. He became fascinated with the banjo and American folk music, especially in the style of Woody Guthrie, Lead Belly, Pete Seeger and other Depression-era artists. During this period, Oberst met guitarist Sean Geil, who shared his musical interests. Together, they recruited Jason Soudrette and formed The Tillers, with Soudrette playing upright bass. In 2008, the band released its debut album, Ludlow Street Rag.

The Tillers quickly became popular on the local and regional folk music scene, and enjoyed a sudden boost in popularity in 2009 when they appeared in the documentary American Character Along Highway 50 on the USA Network, with segments also airing on NBC's nightly newscasts. Hosted by NBC news anchor Tom Brokaw, the program explored the lives of people who live along U.S. Route 50, which stretches from Maryland to California. The Tillers appeared in the program because their song "There is a Road (Route 50)" was used in the soundtrack. Oberst's inspiration came from the iconic highway which passed through the neighborhood where he grew up in Cincinnati.

Over the next three years, The Tillers toured almost nonstop but also found time to record and release three albums: By The Signs (2010), Wild Hog in the Woods (2011) and Farewell to the Historic Southgate House (2012). Their critically acclaimed Hand On The Plow was released in 2013.

While continuing to work with The Tillers, Oberst released his debut solo album Mike Oberst and His Five-String Banjo in 2011. Also, that year, he helped produce a benefit concert, "To Sing with You Once More," to raise money and awareness to fight multiple myeloma cancer in memory of his late mother, who had died from the disease. The concert was also a memorial to Mike Seeger, Pete Seeger’s younger brother and one of Oberst's musical heroes, who also died from the disease. The concert featured folk musicians from all over the United States, including John Cohen and Tracy Schwarz, members of Mike Seeger's former band, The New Lost City Ramblers.

Jason Soudrette left The Tillers in 2010 to further an already successful career in Sprint car racing. He was replaced by Aaron Geil, brother of the band's guitarist, Sean Geil. In 2013, Soudrette died from leukemia. In 2015, The Tillers added fiddler Joe Macheret.

In 2013, Oberst co-founded a music festival in his hometown called "Sayler Park Sustains" to promote environmental and agricultural sustainability, with local environmental organizer Megan Ayers. He also co-founded Paper Street Farm, a nonprofit organic community garden.

In 2016, Oberst produced and co-recorded A Place Way Back in Time, the debut album of Jean Dowell. Although Dowell was known primarily for her role in the development of female college athletics in the 1960s and 1970s, she had been writing songs since her childhood in North Carolina. When Oberst met her, he was so impressed with her songs that he encouraged her to begin performing live and let him produce her first album.

In 2017, Oberst was cast in a supporting role in the independent film The Mountain Minor, playing an old-time fiddler and member of a fictional band called The Willie Abner Band, which was portrayed by The Tillers. The Mountain Minor won awards in several film festivals and was released in 2019.

In 2019, Oberst released his second solo album, Six Feet of Earth, which earned international praise. Americana Highways called the album "honest and simple" yet "vast in its complexities… Anarchistic folk, steeped in tradition, yet fueled with a punk attitude."

== Discography ==
=== Solo ===
- 2011 – Mike Oberst and His Five-String Banjo (ind.)
- 2019 – Six Feet of Earth (Reggieville Records)

=== With The Tillers ===
- 2008 – Ludlow Street Rag (Ind.)
- 2010 – By the Signs (Ind.)
- 2011 – Wild Hog in the Woods (Ind.)
- 2012 – Farewell to the Historic Southgate House (Ind.)
- 2013 – Hand on the Plow (Muddy Roots Records)
- 2018 – The Tillers (Sofaburn Records)

=== With Jean Dowell ===
- 2016 – A Place Way Back in Time (Ind.)

=== With Disarm ===
- 2002 – Disarm (Ind.)

=== With The Resurgence ===
- 2007 – Death-N-Spit Sk8 Street Songs (Reggieville Records)

=== With The Blue Rock Boys ===
- 2006 – The Blue Rock Boys Vol. 1 (Reggieville Records)
- 2014 – The Blue Rock Boys Vol. 2 – Songs of Love & Violence (Reggieville Records)
