= Holiday Mountain =

Electronic music duo

- Origin: Austin, TX
- Genres: Electronic
- Members: Laura Patiño- Keyboard and Vocals Z-Ray (Zander Kagle)- Producer and Drummer
- Past members: Bradley Will - Synth, Bass, and Vocals

Holiday Mountain is an electronic music duo founded in 2011 by Mexican-American songwriter and keyboardist Laura Patiño with drummer and producer Zander Kagle. The two met in Boston while attending Berklee College of Music in 2011. The trio is inspired by music groups like Santigold, Major Lazer, and Die Antwoord. The duo combines edm, hip hop, reggae, dubstep, and Cumbia to create a heavy futuristic dance genre. Patiño's vocal stylings & fashion sense is influenced by Billie Holiday, M.I.A., Amy Winehouse, and Gwen Stefani. The name Holiday Mountain is a combination of Billie Holiday and the Rocky Mountains, two large inspirations for Laura Patiño.

== Notable Performances ==
Holiday Mountain performed at South by Southwest in 2015, receiving rave reviews from Spin Magazine and The Wall St Journal. Front woman Laura Patiño appeared on AfterEllen on May 22, 2015. The duo performed at Utopia Fest at Four Sister's Ranch in Texas in 2013 and 2015. Holiday Mountain also performed at Firefly Music Festival 2016 in Dover, Delaware.

== Releases ==
Holiday Mountain released their first album You Be You, Part One April 28, 2015 independently. The seven track album had a day early stream on Spin.com. They also released single "Bump That Bass" on October 9, 2015. On August 31 of 2015 Holiday Mountain's video for "Getting Really Freaky" premiered on NPR. In a collaboration with the Mexican Institute of Sound the duo released "Como Te Llamas", on June 24, 2016, via Stereogum. Their second album SHIA is set to release on August 12, 2016
