= Mad Anthony (punk rock band) =

American rock band

- Origin: Cincinnati, Ohio, U.S.
- Genres: Stoner rock, grunge, punk rock
- Years active: 2008–present
- Members: Ringo Jones; Adam Flaig; Marc Sherlock
- Past members: Dave Markey; Steve Streit; Justin Smith; Jason "Donkey" Ramsey; Tony Bryant; Daniel Durick

Mad Anthony is an American rock band that was established in Cincinnati, Ohio, United States, in September 2007. Their debut EP album was released in 2008. Followed by ...I Spent All My Money on Speed Metal in 2010, and a self titled album Mad Anthony in 2012. In 2010, Mad Anthony won the Cincinnati Entertainment Award for best punk band. Members include Ringo Jones (vocal and guitar), Adam Flaig (guitar and vocals), and Marc Sherlock (drums). The band's name is an homage to General Anthony Wayne, who went by the nickname of "Mad Anthony".

== Albums ==
- Mad Anthony EP - June 20, 2008
- ...I Spent All My Money On Speed Metal - August 28, 2010
- Mad Anthony & The Yellowbelts - 7-inch vinyl split EP/digital download - August 27, 2011
- Mad Anthony - June 2, 2012
- Sank for Days - August 25, 2014
- Mad Anthology Volume One - September 15, 2017
- Mad Anthology Volume Two - January 26, 2018

Past Members:

- Tony Bryant - Drums - 2009 - 2010
- Daniel Durick - Drums - 2007 - 2009

== Festivals ==
- CincyPunkFest (2008, 2009)
- Midpoint Music Festival (2009, 2010)
- Muncie Music Festival (2009)
- Taste Of Cincinnati (2010)
- Cincy Fringe Festival (2010)
- Millennium Music Conference (February 2011)
- Canadian Music Festival (March 2011)
- Clifton Heights Music Festival (April 2011)
- LAUNCH Music Conference (April 2011)
- MaiFest (May 2011)
- North by Northeast (NXNE) (June 2011)
- Riverfest (September 2011)

== Placements ==
- Radius – Film about the Cincinnati Music Scene and Midpoint Music Festival
- Roller Derby Queens – Documentary on The Cincinnati Roller Girls
- Fallen – One Hour Drama Television Pilot
- Reel Cincinnati – Greater Cincinnati Film Commission Promotional Video
