= 500 Miles to Memphis =

American punk band

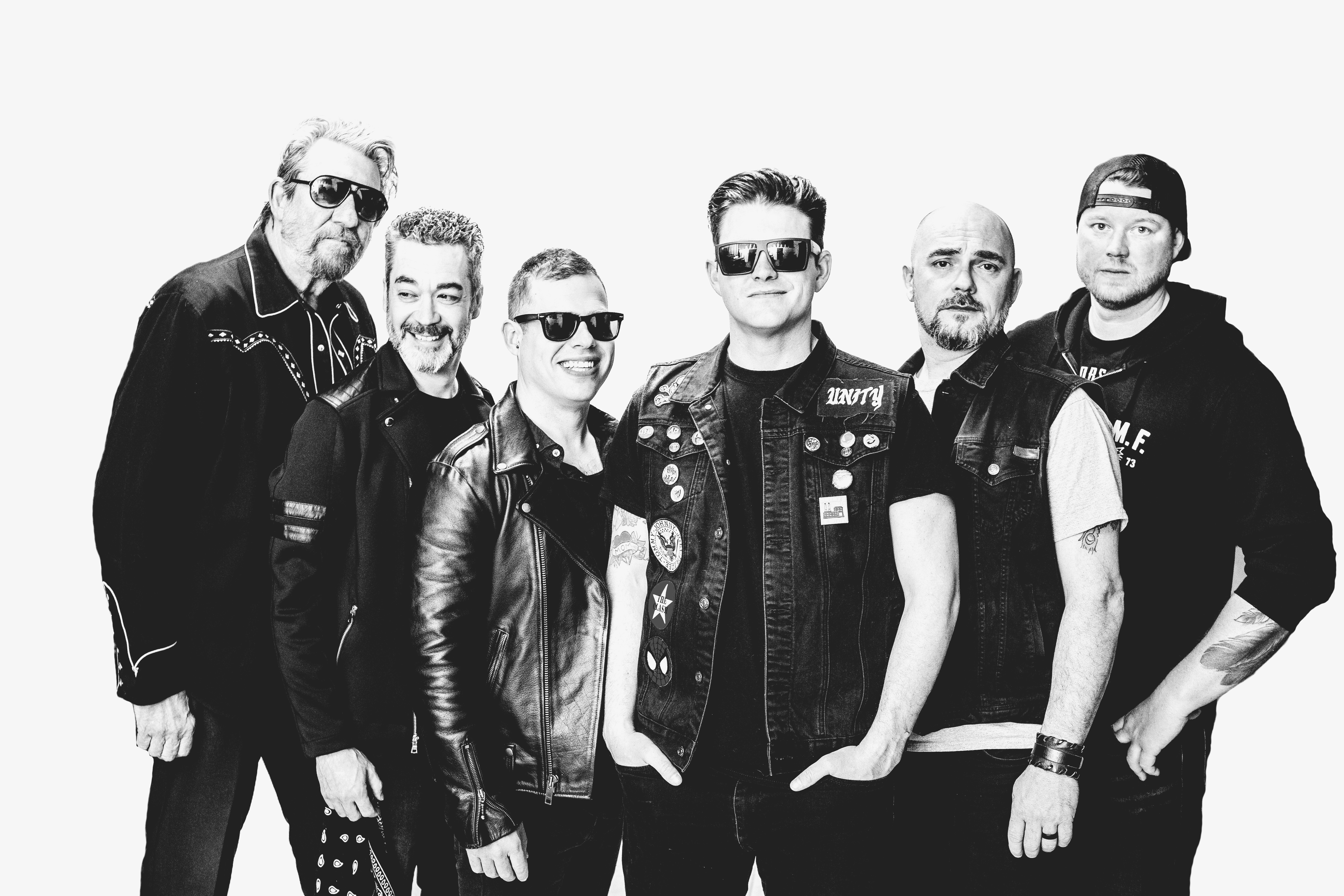
- 500 Miles to Memphis in 2018

Background information
- Origin: Cincinnati, Ohio, United States
- Genres: Punk Rock Americana
- Years active: 2003–present
- Label: Deep Elm Records, Paper + Plastick, Flat Aht Records
- Members: Ryan Malott; Noah Sugarman; Kevin Hogle; David Rhodes Brown; Aaron Whalen; Nate Hickey; Luke Zacherl
- Website: www.500mtm.com

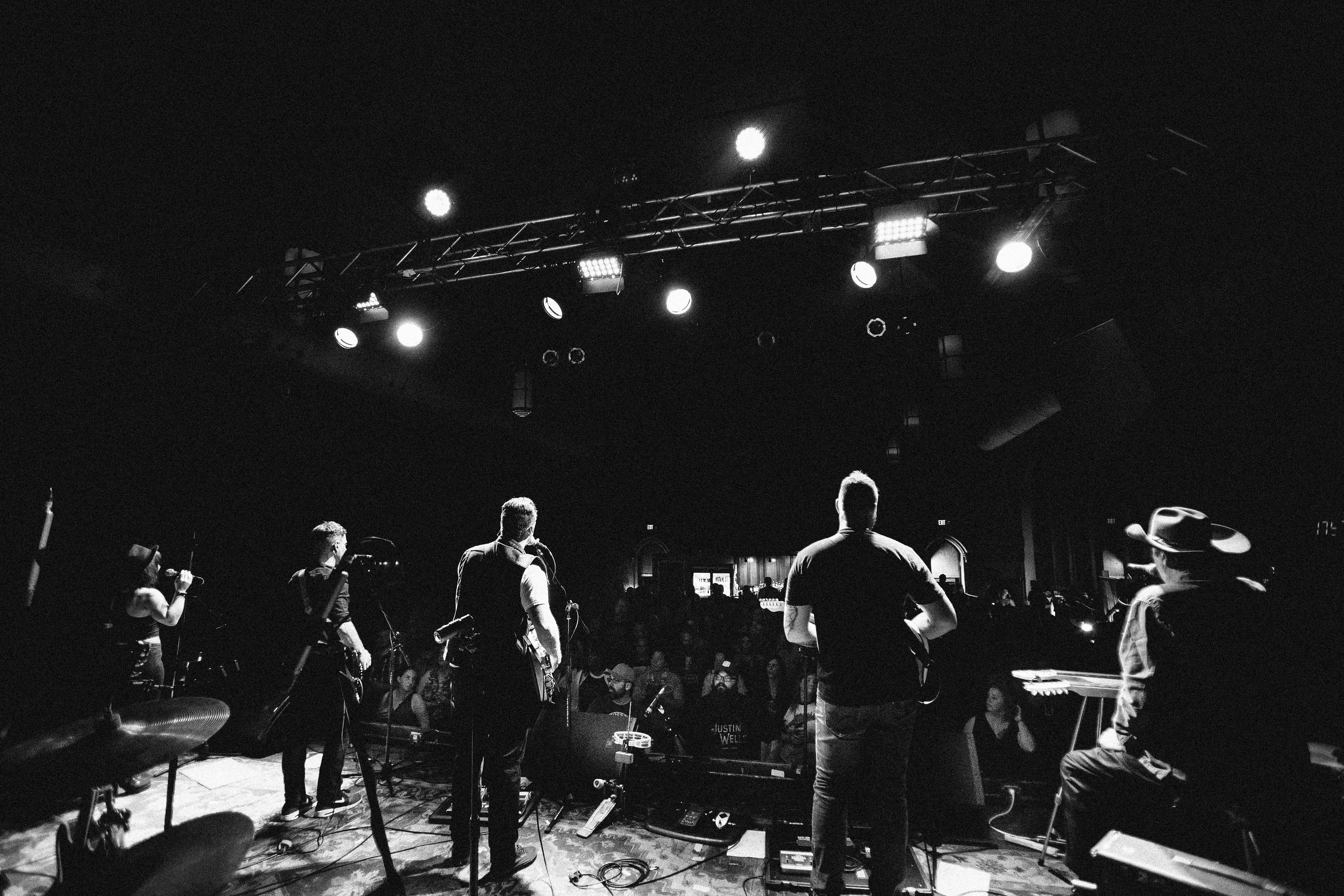
500 Miles to Memphis Live

500 Miles to Memphis is a punk rock americana band from Cincinnati, Ohio. Their music is a cross-genre blend of punk rock, americana, bluegrass, and country. Ryan Malott formed the band in 2003. Since then they have released six studio albums, which have won multiple awards, and been licensed to numerous movies, TV shows, and video games.

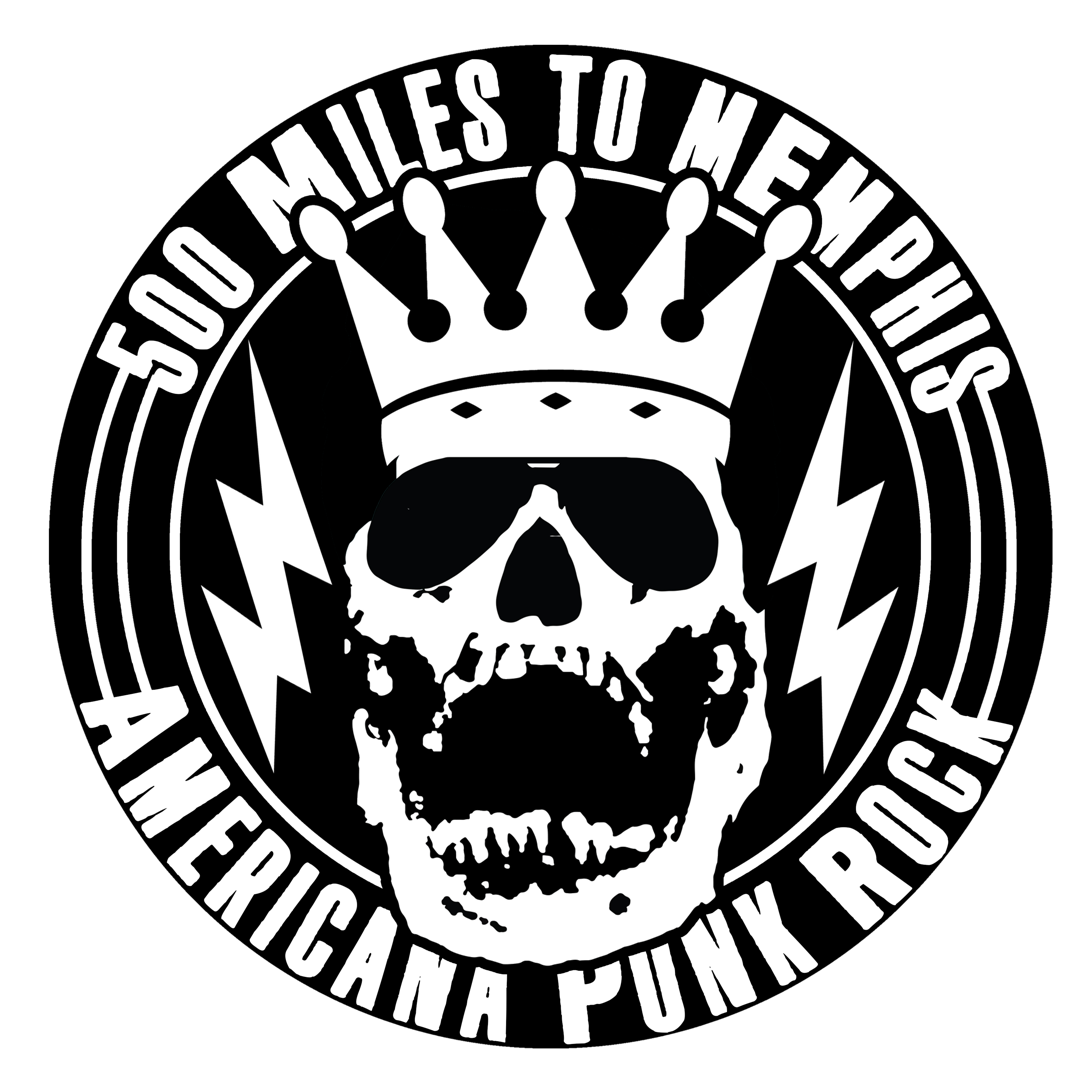
Official logo

They have actively toured the United States since 2003.

500 Miles to Memphis consists of Ryan Malott (vocs, guitar, banjo), David Rhodes Brown (lap steel), Noah Sugarman (bass, vocs), Kevin Hogle (drums), Aaron Whalen (guitar, vocs), Nate Hickey(guitar, mandolin, vocs), and Luke Zacherl(violin).

== Awards ==
500 Miles to Memphis

- Winner of the 2005 Cincinnati Entertainment Award for best Roots/Americana/Folk
- Nominated for the 2006 CEA for best Rock
- Winner of the 2007 CEA for best Live Act
- Winner of the 2007 CEA for best Rock
- Nominated for the 2007 CEA for Album of The Year
- Nominated for the 2007 CEA for Artist of the Year
- Winner or the 2008 CEA for best Rock
- Nominated for the 2010 CEA for Album of the Year
- Winner of the 2011 CEA for Best Live Act
- Winner of the 2012 CEA for Best Live Act
- Winner of the 2013 CEA for Best Live Act
- Nominated for the 2015 CEA for Album of the Year

== Licensing ==
500MTM's music has been licensed to multiple movies and TV shows, including:

- Travis Pastrana 199 Lives
- Kid Rock"Under-rated and Unsung"
- MTV's Nitro Circus
- MTV's Teen Mom
- Rock Band the video game
- Marlboro's bands on the run

== Band members ==
=== Current members ===
- Ryan Malott - vocals, guitar, banjo (2003–present)
- Noah Sugarman - bass, vocals (2005–present)
- Aaron Whalen - guitar, vocals (2010–present)
- Kevin Hogle - drums (2007–present)
- David Rhodes Brown - lap steel (2006–present)
- Nate Hickey - vocals, mandolin, guitar (2018–present)
- Luke Zacherl - violin (2020–present)

=== Past members ===
- Joshua Murphy - vocals, guitar (2014–2018)
- Jeff Snyder - bass (2007–2010)
- Elaina Brown - keyboard, vocals (2009–2010)
- Stephen Kuffner - guitar, vocals (2007–2009)
- Jason Gallagher - guitar
- Wade Owens - bass (2003–2005)
- Lee Steele - drums
- Brett Davis - drums (live/touring)
- Brian Davis - guitar (live/touring)
- Bryan Poindexter - drums
- Wasabi Hansen - guitar, vocals
- Aaron Hostetler - guitar, vocals
- Sean Duley - drums
- Ben Wirsching - drums
- Greg Tudor - backup vocals, guitar (2013-04-12, Newport, KY, The Southgate House Revival)

=== Session musicians ===
- Paul Patterson - fiddle (2007)
- Annalyse McCoy - vocals (2007)

== Discography ==
=== Studio albums ===
- (2005) 500 Miles to Memphis (3rd Silo Records)
- (2007) Sunshine in a Shot Glass (Deep Elm Records)
- (2010) We’ve Built Up to Nothing (Self-released)
- (2014) Stand There and Bleed (Self-released)
- (2018) Basement Bluegrass Sessions EP (Self-released)
- (Jan 2019) Blessed Be the Damned (Self-released)
- (August 2019) Blessed Be the Damned (Paper + Plastick Records)
- (October 2021) Hard to Love (Flat Aht Records)

=== Live albums ===
- (2011) Live at the Historic Southgate House
- (2018) Revival (Self-released)
