= Kansas Bible Company =

American band

- Origin: Goshen, Indiana, US
- Genres: Rock and Roll
- Years active: 2008-present
- Members: Jacob Miller; Michael Ruth; Jeff Yoder; Nathan Morrow; James Green; Charles Frederick; Jake Snyder
- Website: kansasbiblecompany.com

Kansas Bible Company is a band from Goshen, Indiana based in Nashville, Tennessee. The band's name was derived from the 1973 film Paper Moon.

== History ==
The band began in 2008 at Goshen College, where all members attended. After a year-long hiatus the band got back together in 2010, releasing their first album Ad Astra Per Aspera before moving to Nashville. In November 2012, the band released its second full-length album Hotel Chicamauga.

In April 2013, the band released an 8-bit video game to promote the single "Jesus, The Horse Thief" from Hotel Chicamauga.

== Discography ==
- Ad Astra Per Aspera (Self-Released, 2011)
- Surf Rock Trilogy EP (Self-Released, 2011)
- Hotel Chicamauga (Self-Released, 2012)
- Dads Day (Self-Released, 2014)
- Paper Moon (Self-Released, 2016)
- Saturn's Return (Self-Released, 2021)
