= Ha Ha Tonka (band) =

American rock band

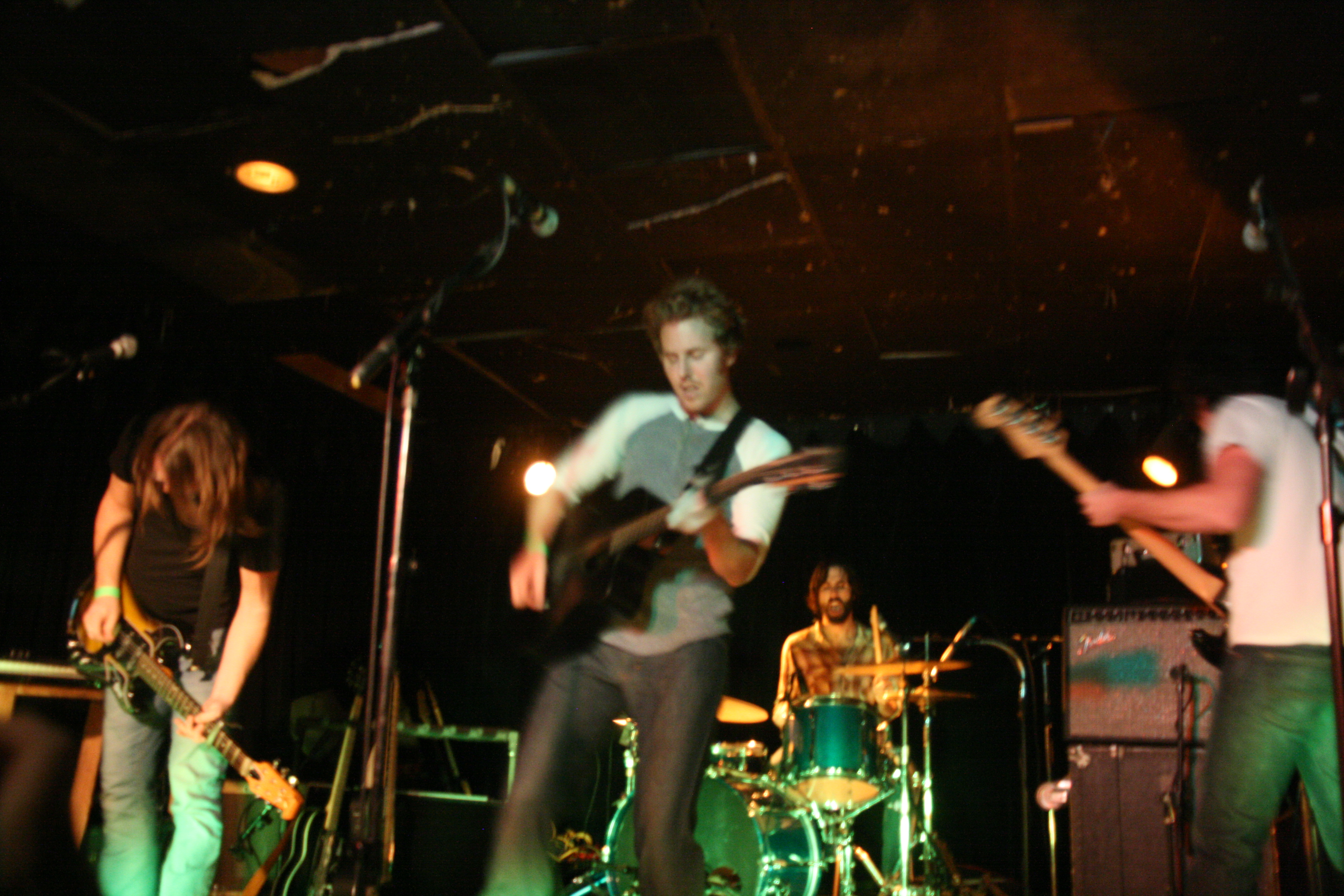

Background information
- Also known as: Amsterband (2005-2007)
- Origin: West Plains, Missouri, United States
- Genres: Indie rock Southern rock
- Years active: 2005–present
- Labels: May Apple Records, Bloodshot Records
- Members: Brett Anderson; Brian Roberts; Luke Long; Chris Mason; Nick Siegel
- Past members: Lennon Bone; Robert Mueller; Mike Reilly; James Cleare
- Website: http://www.hahatonkamusic.com/

Ha Ha Tonka is an American band originally formed in West Plains, Missouri, United States, and currently signed to Bloodshot Records out of Chicago, Illinois. The band is named after Ha Ha Tonka State Park in Camdenton, Missouri.

== About ==
After signing to Bloodshot Records, Buckle in the Bible Belt was released on September 11, 2007. "St. Nick on the Fourth in a Fervor" released as the first single from that album.

The band's website says that their "dark view of the realities of socio-economic hardship, backwoods prejudices and drug abuse is leavened by wry humor and a deep appreciation for regional storytelling traditions." The lead singer, Brian Roberts, is a cancer survivor who criticizes the American health care system in "This Is Not a Cure for the Common Cold". One reviewer stated that "Ha Ha Tonka make the kind of roots rock that fits the mood of America in the summer of 2008. It's restless, edgy and increasingly willing to address the dark side of This Land."

== Discography ==
=== Studio albums ===
- 2007: Buckle in the Bible Belt (Bloodshot Records re-release)
- 2009: Novel Sounds of the Nouveau South (Bloodshot Records)
- 2011: Death of a Decade (Bloodshot Records)
- 2013: Lessons (Bloodshot Records)
- 2017: Heart-Shaped Mountain (Bloodshot Records)
- 2023: BloodRedMoon (Self-Released)
