= Those Darlins =

American rock and roll band

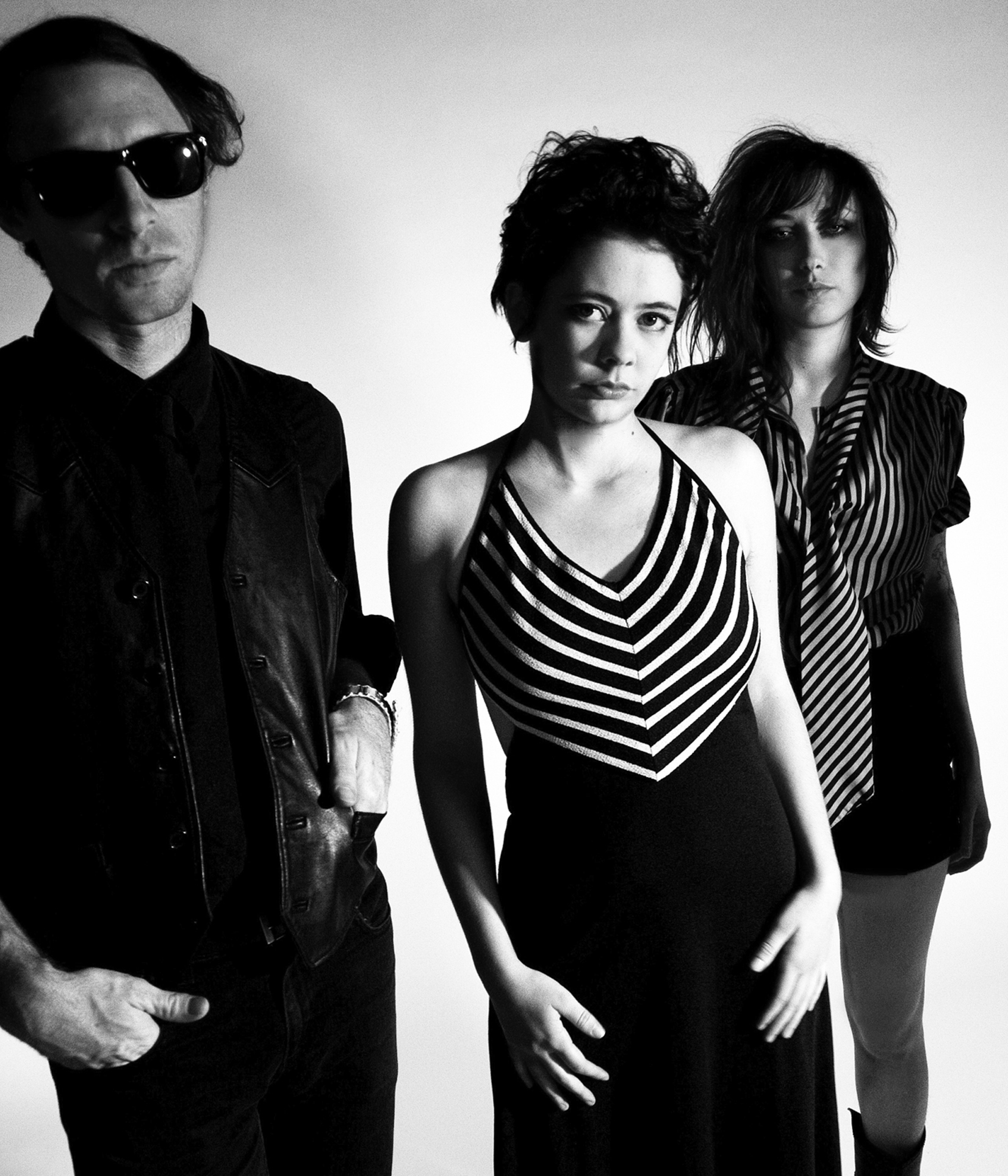
- L to R: Linwood Regensburg, Jessi Zazu, Nikki Kvarnes

Background information
- Origin: Nashville, Tennessee, U.S.
- Genres: Rock and roll; garage rock; cowpunk; country
- Years active: 2006–2016
- Label: Oh Wow Dang
- Past members: Kelley Anderson; Adrian Barrera; Jessi Zazu; Nikki Kvarnes; Linwood Regensburg
- Website: thosedarlins.com

Those Darlins was an American rock and roll band from Nashville, Tennessee, active from 2006 to 2016. The group has released three albums, their alt-country-leaning self-titled debut Those Darlins in 2009, the garage rock influenced Screws Get Loose in 2011, and the more classic rock and roll Blur the Line in 2013. The band also owns and operates its own record label Oh Wow Dang Records. The band entered into a hiatus in 2016.

Lead singer Jessi Zazu died from cancer on September 12, 2017.

== History ==
=== Origin ===
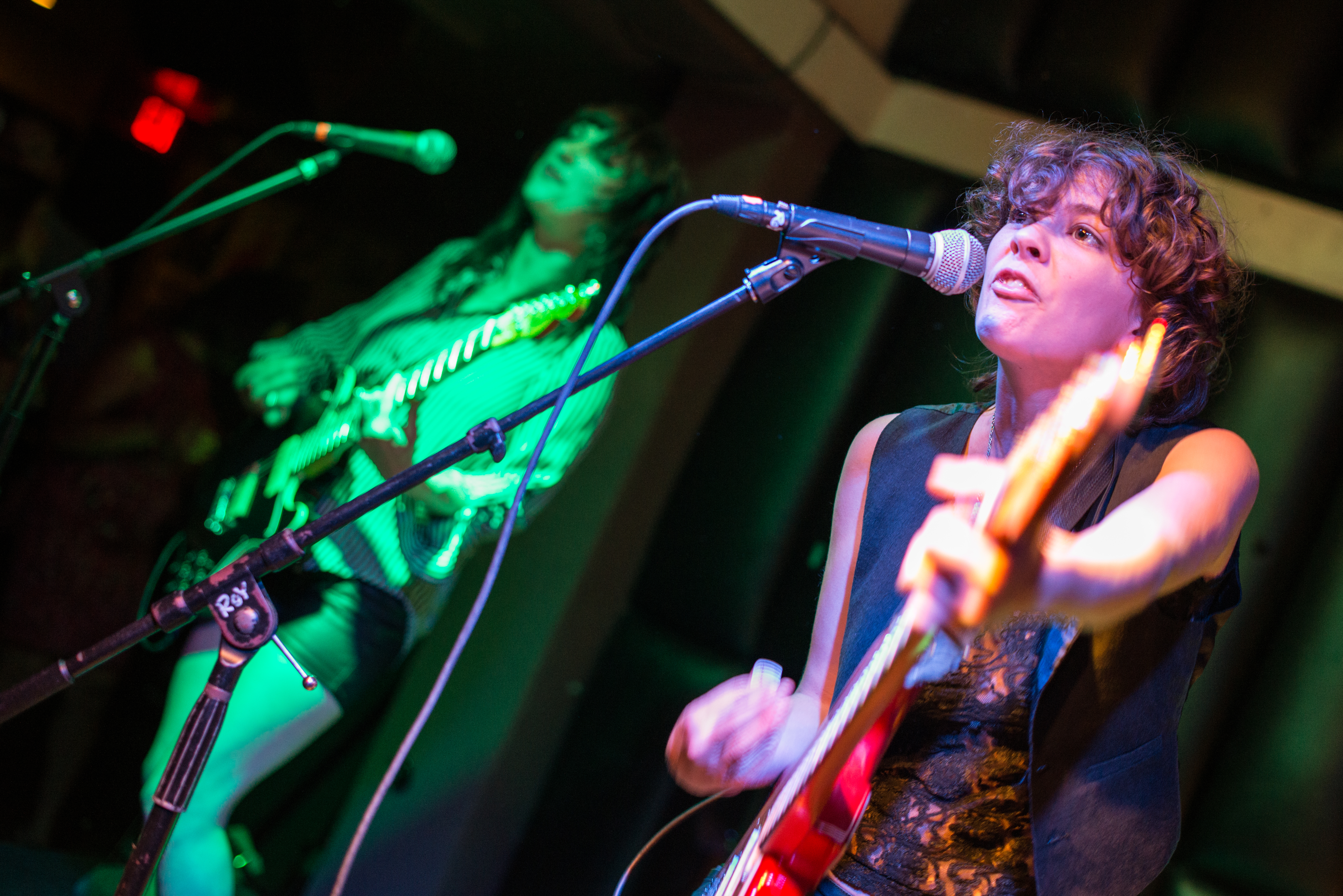
Those Darlins performing in San Diego in 2014

Jessi Zazu, Nikki Kvarnes, and Kelley Anderson formed Those Darlins after meeting at the Southern Girls Rock & Roll Camp in Murfreesboro, Tennessee.

They began by covering Carter Family songs and employed traditional southern instrumentation, including washboard and clogging, as well as less traditional instruments like the baritone ukulele. The three adopted the stage name Darlin, a practice that continued until Anderson's departure in 2012.

They released their first single "Wild One" in 2008. Soon after, Dan Auerbach from The Black Keys asked the band to open on his U.S. solo tour, raising the band's profile.

=== Those Darlins (self-titled) ===
The band entered the studio with Jeff Curtin of Small Black (who had worked previously on Vampire Weekend's self-titled album) to record their debut. The album mixes the Appalachian and alt-country sounds they were known for with rockabilly and rock and roll sensibilities. The first single from the album, "Red Light Love", would be used in a national commercial for the Kia Sorento.

In support of their self-titled album, the band toured alongside a number of rock acts, such as Dr. Dog, The Features, The King Khan & BBQ Show and JEFF the Brotherhood.

=== Screws Get Loose ===
After touring together behind their debut album, the band asked long-time drummer Linwood Regensburg to join the band as an official member and songwriting partner. The four-piece went into the studio in 2011 to record their follow-up album, again with Jeff Curtin producing, but this time engineered by Ed Rawls, known for his work with garage rock-leaning Atlanta bands such as Black Lips and early Deerhunter.

With these influences, the band's sophomore record Screws Get Loose adopted an aggressive garage rock sound which Robert Christgau of NPR and The Village Voice called "hooky, saucy, punky songwriting in a mood somewhere between Be Your Own Pet and The Donnas, only savvier". In support of the album, the band released music videos for singles "Screws Get Loose" and "Be Your Bro". The band toured alongside Best Coast, Drive-By Truckers and Old 97's in the U.S.. and went on their first European Tour in early 2012.

=== Departure of Kelley Anderson ===
In February 2012, Those Darlins announced that founding member Kelley Anderson would be leaving the band to pursue other musical projects and professional ventures. She would eventually be replaced by bassist Adrian Barrera, who had toured with the band previously while a member of Gentlemen Jesse & His Men.

=== Blur the Line ===
In early 2013, Those Darlins returned to the studio to work on their third album, this time recording in their hometown of Nashville with producer Roger Moutenot (Yo La Tengo, John Cale, JEFF the Brotherhood). Before officially announcing the album, the band hung up a banner of the cover art, which features the nude legs and torsos of the four members of the band, in front of Nashville record store Grimey's New & Preloved Music. Local WZTV ran a story on the banner, which caused controversy among those concerned with the display of the image on a well-trafficked street. The band took credit for the image but claimed that the controversy it sparked was unintentional.

Soon after, Paste magazine announced that band's album Blur the Line would be released on 1 October, and shared videos for the first two singles, "Oh God" and "Optimist". SPIN called Blur the Line "tough and seductive" while 'Blurt wrote that "songwriting/arranging this masterful elevates Blur the Line to modern-classic status".

=== Hiatus ===
On December 9, 2015, the band announced on its Facebook page, that they were going on hiatus. "We're here to deliver some unfortunate news... Those Darlins will be taking an indefinite hiatus effective after our final tour in January. We've had a really great run together, but the time has come for us to move in different directions. We really appreciate all the love and support from our friends, fans, and family over the years." On March 17, 2016, Those Darlins played their last show ever at Baby's All Right in Brooklyn.

Frontwoman Jessi Zazu died of cervical cancer on September 12, 2017. She was 28 years old.

== Discography ==
Oh Wow Dang Records released all of the recordings listed below (except where noted), but has released no other recordings by anyone else.

=== Albums ===
- Those Darlins (2009)
- Screws Get Loose (2011)
- Blur the Line (2013)
- Live at Pickathon (2015) -- split 12" (with Diarrhea Planet) for Record Store Day 2015 (Easy Sound Recording Co.)

=== EPs ===
- Wild One (2008)

=== Singles ===
- "Wild One" b/w "Drivin' Nails in My Coffin" (2008)
- "Nightjogger" b/w "Funstix Party" (2010)
- "Be Your Bro" b/w "Let U Down" (2011)
- "Screws Get Loose (extended version)" b/w "Prank Call" (2011)
- "Mystic Mind" b/w "Pet You and Hold You" (2012)
- "Summer's Dead" b/w "Prison Shanks" (split 7-inch with Heavy Cream) (2012)
- "In the Wilderness (radio edit)" b/w "Blur the Line" (2013)

=== Music Videos ===
- "Red Light Love" (2009)
- "Be Your Bro" (2011)
- "Screws Get Loose" (2011)
- "Optimist" (2013)
- "Oh God" (2013)
- "In The Wilderness" (2014)
