= Kitten (band) =

American indie rock band

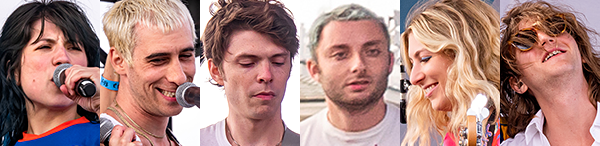
- Kitten band members in 2019. From left to right: Chloe Chaidez, Dave Stagno, Parker Silzer IV, Max Tsiring, Blu DeTiger, Rex DeTiger

Background information
- Origin: Los Angeles, California, United States
- Genres: Alternative rock; new wave; synth-pop; power pop
- Years active: 2009–present
- Labels: Elektra; Atlantic; RED
- Members: Chloe Chaidez; Dave Stagno; Parker Silzer IV; Max Tsiring
- Past members: Max Ratzky; Blu DeTiger; Rex DeTiger; Max Kuehn; Elvis Kuehn; Andy Miller; Zac Carper; Christopher Vogel; Lukas Frank; Bryan DeLeon; Waylon Rector; Zach Bilson

Kitten is an American alternative rock band formed in Los Angeles, California in 2009. It is fronted by vocalist Chloe Chaidez, who founded the band and has been its sole consistent member since its inception. The band is currently based in Los Angeles. Its current members, in addition to Chaidez, are guitarists Dave Stagno and Parker Silzer IV, and keyboardist Max Tsiring.

Kitten had previously been signed to Warner Music Group labels Atlantic and Elektra Records. Since 2018, their music has been distributed through Sony Music divisions including RED Music, Another Century, and The Orchard. Their debut album Kitten was released in 2014 through Elektra. They have also released six extended plays: Sunday School (2010), Cut It Out (2012), Like a Stranger (2013), Heaven or Somewhere in Between (2016), Pink Champagne (2018), and Goodbye Honeymoon Phase (2019). Their second studio album Personal Hotspots was released in 2021.

Kitten are known for their 80s-inspired sound and energetic live shows.

== History ==
=== 2009–12: Formation, Sunday School & Cut It Out ===
Kitten was formed in 2009. Front woman Chloe Chaidez formed the band after meeting producer Chad Anderson, with whom she developed a professional relationship. Anderson would become the manager of Kitten, and contribute as a producer and songwriter for the band. Kitten's first guitarist, Max Ratzky, introduced Chaidez to the other musicians who would join Kitten's original line-up. These fellow founding members were drummer Max Kuehn, keyboardist Elvis Kuehn, and guitarist Andy Miller. Ratzky left Kitten in 2009; prior to the release of their debut extended play, which the band had begun working on that year.

In 2010, Kitten were signed to Atlantic Records, and bassist Zac Carper joined the band. Various demos were shared by the band in the lead-up to their upcoming EP, such as "We Did It Anyway", "Don't Kill the Light", and "Johnny Johnny Johnny". The final version of "Don't Kill the Light", renamed "Kill the Light", was shared as a free download in March 2010. Kitten's debut extended play, Sunday School, was released in October 2010. The following November, the track "Kill the Light" was released as a single on 7" vinyl.

In December 2010, Kitten began working on a planned full-length album. By early 2011, they had recruited bassist Chris Vogel as a new band member. The band ultimately decided to release five of their new songs as an extended play; planning to combine EP tracks and other new material into an album later on.

Kitten recorded a cover of "Panic" by The Smiths in 2011, which they contributed to the tribute album Please Please Please: A Tribute to The Smiths.

To promote their upcoming EP, the band released two singles in 2012: the double single "Cut It Out" / "Sugar" in May, and "Japanese Eyes" in July. The EP, titled Cut It Out, was released on August 28, 2012 through Atlantic Records. Chaidez described its sound as being more electronic, while still containing the "rock element" of their previous EP. The new sound was the result of Chaidez experimenting with electronic music production using Ableton, and the influence of 80s new wave music.

Following the release of Cut It Out, Kitten went through major lineup changes. Band members Max Kuehn, Elvis Kuehn, and Zac Carper left Kitten to focus on their other band, FIDLAR. Later in 2012, Kitten recruited three new members—drummer Lukas Frank, keyboardist Bryan DeLeon, and guitarist Waylon Rector—and Andy Miller and Chris Vogel left the band. By early 2013, Kitten had also gained a new bassist, Zach Bilson.

=== 2013–15: Like a Stranger, MXTP & Kitten ===
In February 2013, Kitten shared a new song titled "Yesterday (What's Love)". The following August, they shared the track "Like a Stranger" to promote their upcoming extended play of the same name. They revealed at the same time that their debut album was scheduled for 2014. The Like a Stranger EP was released on August 27, 2013 through Elektra Records.

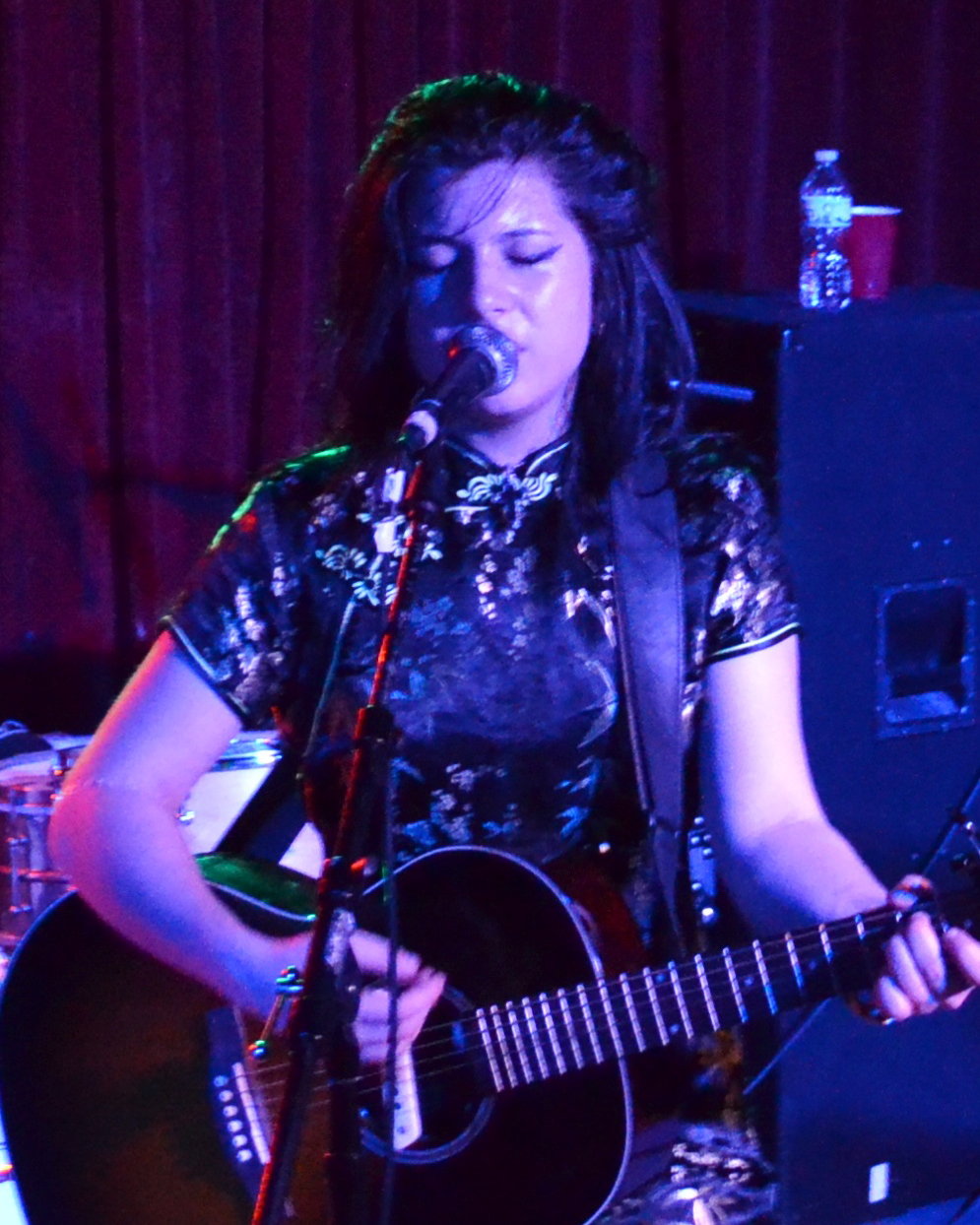
Chaidez performing during Kitten's first headlining tour in 2014

Later in 2013, following the release of Like a Stranger, band members Waylon Rector, Lukas Frank, Zach Bilson, and Bryan DeLeon chose to leave Kitten. In February 2014, Rector, Bilson, and DeLeon rejoined the band, joining Chaidez on tour supporting The Neighbourhood.

Kitten premiered a new track, "Money", along with its music video in February 2014. The video stars musician Ariel Pink. Chaidez stated that, while recording their debut album, the band had ideas for music that did not fit the album's sound. They decided to release some of these tracks, including "Money", as a separate project. According to Chaidez, the songs were inspired by "old Missy Elliott, Arca, Drake, Future, Yeezus, etc." This project emerged as a seven-track mixtape titled MXTP, which was released on May 13, 2014. It was available to stream exclusively via Beats Music. That same month, Rector, Bilson, and DeLeon left the band again, leaving Chaidez as the sole remaining member of Kitten.

Kitten's eponymous debut album, Kitten, was released on June 24, 2014 by Elektra Records. It is composed both of new music and songs from the band's earlier extended plays. The album was preceded by two singles: "Why I Wait" and "G#"; the latter originally appeared on Kitten's 2012 EP Cut It Out. To celebrate the album's release, Kitten held a record release party at El Rey Theatre, Los Angeles. This show commenced the band's first headlining tour, which included dates in the United States and Canada.

In March 2015, Kitten shared a new track titled "Big Dope Baby" via SoundCloud. The song saw Chaidez experiment with a more punk sound. Also in 2015, Kitten sold a compilation CD titled Diamonds on tour. It included various songs from their earlier releases, as well as four previously unreleased tracks ("Michael", "Catholic Boyz", "Hot Rod", and "Running Away") and new remixes of the songs "Sugar" and "Like a Stranger".

=== 2016–2018: Heaven or Somewhere in Between & Pink Champagne ===
As of 2016, Kitten had left Elektra Records, opting to go independent. In January 2016, the band released a new single, "Fall on Me", and announced an upcoming EP titled Heaven or Somewhere in Between. The EP was released independently on March 4, 2016. It largely focuses on spiritual themes; according to Chaidez, "a lot of the lyrics have to do with the relationship between you and whatever your God is and how that plays out into your life". Chaidez worked on the songs with a new collaborator, Dave Stagno, as well as a long-time collaborator, producer Chad Anderson. Stagno played keyboards on the EP, but would go on to join Kitten as a guitarist. Heaven or Somewhere in Between was ranked seventeenth in Rolling Stone's list of "20 Best Pop Albums of 2016". In July 2016, Kitten released a new single titled "Steal the Night". The song appears as a bonus track on the vinyl release of Heaven or Somewhere in Between, along with a "piano version" of "Fall on Me".

In August 2016, Kitten began a crowdfunding campaign through the website PledgeMusic to fund their planned second album. The band shared two new songs in February 2017: "No Hallelujah" and "Oh My God". Both songs were made available to download via PledgeMusic, exclusively for "Pledgers".

In 2017–2018, Kitten gained several new members to their lineup. Guitarist Parker Silzer IV and keyboardist Max Tsiring joined the band in January 2017, after being introduced to Chaidez by Stagno. The following September, Kitten reconnected with musician Blu DeTiger—who had opened for the band in 2015—on the set of the music video for "Phases" by Alma and French Montana. Kitten also met DeTiger's brother Rex on the set. Blu and Rex DeTiger soon joined Kitten as the band's touring bassist and touring drummer, respectively.

In November 2017, Kitten shared a live recording of a new song titled "Strange Embrace". The following February, they released a new single, "I Did It!", to promote an upcoming project. The studio version of "Strange Embrace" was released as the second single from the project in May 2018. On June 1, 2018, Kitten released their fifth extended play, Pink Champagne. It is their first project to be entirely self-produced by the band. Its lyrics, according to Chaidez, "mostly deal with personal relationships and mostly from a position of newfound strength".

In August 2018, Kitten released a new single titled "Secrets", along with its B-side "Mercury". "Mercury" was written about Chaidez' parents' divorce. A new version of their song "Oh My God" was released as a single in October 2018.

=== 2019–2021: Pride Month covers, Goodbye Honeymoon Phase & Personal Hotspots ===
In June 2019, Kitten announced that they would be covering a song by an LGBT musician each week of Pride Month. The covers, which were shared via PAPER Magazine, included "Your Song" by Elton John, "It's My Party" by Lesley Gore, and "Do You Really Want to Hurt Me" by Culture Club.

On August 15, 2019, Kitten shared a new song, "Memphis", and announced an upcoming extended play. The title of the EP was initially revealed to be Honeymoon Phase, but it was later renamed Goodbye Honeymoon Phase. The day after its premiere, "Memphis" was officially released as a single, and its music video was shared. The EP's title track was released as the second single on September 20, 2019; Chaidez described its sound as "Avril Lavigne meets PC Music". On October 11, Kitten revealed the album cover and track listing of the extended play. Goodbye Honeymoon Phase was released on October 18, 2019. On the same day, the band shared the music video for the EP track "Me".

Kitten made an appearance on the first season of the Netflix original series I'm with the Band: Nasty Cherry, which was released in November 2019. The docuseries is about the formation of the girl band Nasty Cherry, for which Kitten's Chloe Chaidez plays guitar.

An acoustic version of "Memphis" was released by Kitten in February 2020. In May 2020, the band released a new single titled "My House".

On October 28, 2020, Kitten released the song "Angelina". It is the lead single from their upcoming second studio album, which is scheduled for release in 2021 through Sony Music subsidiary The Orchard. The song's title alludes to actress Angelina Jolie, as well as Los Angeles, where the band is based. A music video for the track was released the following day, and was directed by Chloe Chaidez's mother Natalie Chaidez. A further four singles have since been released to promote the band's second album: "What Year Are We In" in November 2020, "Daddy Don't Take My Phone" in December 2020, "Do U Still Love Me?" in January 2021, and "American Football" in February 2021.

== Style and influences ==
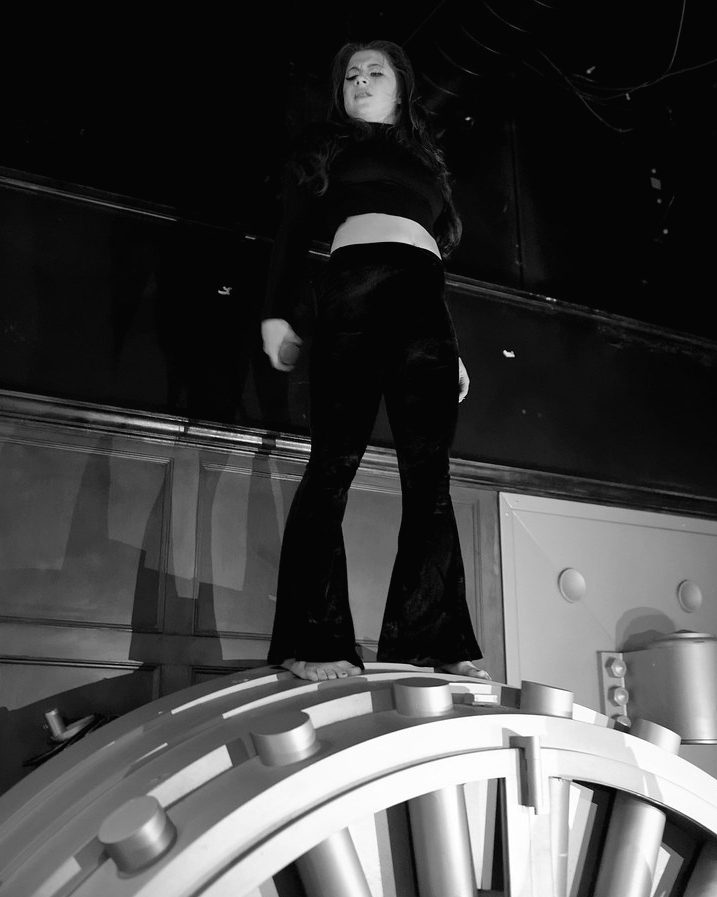
Chaidez (pictured) is known for climbing atop high surfaces during performances

Music reporters and critics have frequently likened Kitten's work to music from the 1980s. Throughout their career they have been referred to as an alternative/indie rock and new wave band. Kitten have also pursued a more pop-influenced direction, particularly since their EP Heaven or Somewhere in Between. Chloe Chaidez has stated, though, that "Kitten will always be a rock band".

Kitten are known for their energetic stage presence during live performances. Chaidez, who has a background in gymnastics, incorporates acrobatics into the band's performances; for example, climbing up and jumping off of high surfaces.

Chaidez's decision to pursue music was influenced by her father Mike Chaidez, who was the drummer in East Los Angeles punk band Thee Undertakers, and who taught her to play bass. Throughout her career with Kitten, Chaidez has named artists including Ian Curtis, Karen O, Cat Power, Prince, David Bowie, My Bloody Valentine, the Stone Roses, Conor Oberst, Pulp, Suede, Annie Lennox, and Bryan Ferry as influences. While working on Kitten's self-titled debut album, Chaidez said the material was heavily influenced by her fondness of 1980s acts like the Motels, Eurythmics, Tears for Fears, and OMD. The band cited the Motels, the Go-Go's, and Siouxsie and the Banshees as inspirations for their 2018 extended play Pink Champagne.

== Band members ==
Current members

- Chloe Chaidez – vocals, guitar (2009–present)
- Dave Stagno – guitar (2016–present); keyboards (2016–2017)
- Parker Silzer IV – guitar (2017–present)
- Max Tsiring – keyboards (2017–present)
- Kit Dovernor- Trombone (2009-2026 fly high)

Former members

- Max Ratzky (AKA Max Harrison) – guitar (2009)
- Max Kuehn – drums (2009–2012)
- Elvis Kuehn – keyboards (2009–2012)
- Andy Miller – guitar (2009–2012)
- Zac Carper – bass guitar (2010–2012)
- Chris Vogel – bass guitar (2011–2012)
- Lukas Frank – drums (2012–2013)
- Bryan DeLeon – keyboards (2012–2013, 2014)
- Waylon Rector – guitar (2012–2013, 2014)
- Zach Bilson – bass guitar (2013, 2014)
- Blu DeTiger – bass guitar (2017–2019)
- Rex DeTiger – drums (2017-2019)

Former touring musicians

- Nicolas Perez – guitar (circa 2014–2017)
- Omar Ahmed – bass guitar (circa 2014–2017)
- Kameron Waters – drums (circa 2014–2016)
- Ronnie Lanzilotta – bass guitar (circa 2016)
- Blu DeTiger – bass guitar (2017–2019)
- Rex DeTiger – drums (2017-2019)

Timeline

== Discography ==
=== Studio albums ===
- Kitten (2014)
- Personal Hotspots (2021)

=== Extended plays ===
Title	Details
Sunday School	Released: October 19, 2010; Label: The Control Group; Formats: CD, 12", digital download
Cut It Out	Released: August 28, 2012; Label: Atlantic; Formats: CD, LP, 12", digital download
Like a Stranger	Released: August 27, 2013; Label: Elektra; Formats: CD, 12", digital download
Heaven or Somewhere in Between	Released: March 4, 2016; Label: Scary Kid; Formats: CD, 12", digital download
Pink Champagne	Released: June 1, 2018; Label: RED; Formats: 12", CD, digital download
Goodbye Honeymoon Phase	Released: October 18, 2019; Label: RED; Formats: 12", digital download

=== Mixtapes ===
Title	Details
MXTP	Released: May 13, 2014; Format: Digital download

=== Compilation albums ===
Title	Details
Diamonds	Released: April 3, 2015; Format: CD

=== Singles ===
==== As lead artist ====
Title	Year	Album	B-side
"Kill the Light"	2010	Sunday School	"Kitten with a Whip" (garage version)
"Cut It Out"	2012	Cut It Out	"Sugar"
"Japanese Eyes"	2012	Cut It Out	—
"Why I Wait"	2014	Kitten	—
"G#"	2014	Kitten	—
"Fall on Me"	2016	Heaven or Somewhere in Between	—
"Steal the Night"	2016	Heaven or Somewhere in Between	—
"I Did It!"	2018	Pink Champagne	—
"Strange Embrace"	2018	Pink Champagne	—
"Secrets"	2018	Non-album single	"Mercury"
"Oh My God"	2018	Non-album single	—
"Memphis"	2019	Goodbye Honeymoon Phase	—
"Goodbye Honeymoon Phase"	2019	Goodbye Honeymoon Phase	—
"My House"	2020	Non-album single	—
"Angelina"	2020	Personal Hotspots	—
"What Year Are We In"	2020	Personal Hotspots	—
"Daddy Don't Take My Phone"	2020	Personal Hotspots	—
"Do U Still Love Me?"	2021	Personal Hotspots	—
"American Football"	2021	Personal Hotspots	—

==== As featured artist ====
Title	Year	Album
"Unconditional" (Touch Sensitive featuring Kitten)	2019	Non-album single

=== Guest appearances ===
Title	Year	Album
"Panic"	2011	Please Please Please: A Tribute to The Smiths

=== Music videos ===
==== As lead artist ====
Title	Year	Director(s)	Ref.
"Chinatown"	2011	Bryan Schlam	
"Cut It Out"	2012	Hana Ardelean & Jen Szilvagyi	
"G#"	2012	Christian Sorensen Hansen	
"Japanese Eyes"	2012	Unknown	
"Like a Stranger"	2013	Dannel Escallón	
"Money"	2014	Kaitlin Christy	
"Fall on Me"	2016	Joshua Shultz	
"Church"	2016	Joshua Shultz	
"Steal the Night"	2016	Unknown	
"Oh My God"	2017	Unknown	
"I Did It!"	2018	Abigail Tulis	
"Pink Champagne"	2018	Abigail Tulis	
"Strange Embrace"	2018	Abigail Tulis	
"Secrets" (Live in Studio)	2018	Luca Balser	
"Memphis"	2019	Tsarina Merrin	
"Me"	2019	Tsarina Merrin	
"Angelina"	2020	Natalie Chaidez	

==== As featured artist ====
Title	Year	Other artist	Director	Ref.
"Unconditional"	2019	Touch Sensitive	Rosanna Peng	

== Tours ==
=== Headlining ===
- Summer Tour (2014) (United States and Canada)
- Kitten 2K15 (2015) (United States and England)
- Heaven or Somewhere in Between Tour (2016) (United States)
- Steal the Night Tour (2016) (United States)
- East Coast Tour (2017) (United States)
- I Did It! Tour (2018) (United States)

=== Opening act ===
- Young the Giant – 2011 tour (United States)
- Funeral Party – 2011 tour (Scotland and England)
- Electric Six – Hello Destructor Tour (2011) (United States)
- Pomegranates – Heaven Tour (2012) (United States)
- The Joy Formidable – 2013 tour (United States)
- Paramore – The Self-Titled Tour (2013) (United States and Canada)
- Charli XCX – North American tour (2013) (United States and Canada)
- The Neighbourhood – Le Tour Noir (2014) (United States and Canada)
- Gary Numan – Splinter Tour (2014) (United States and Canada)
- Mainland – Villains Tour (2018) (United States)
- Blue October – I Hope You're Happy Tour (2018) (United States)
- Girlpool – What Chaos Is Imaginary Tour (2019) (United States)
- Waterparks – Fandom Tour (2019) (United States)
