= Like a Stranger =

Like a Stranger may refer to:

- Like a Stranger (album), an album by Johnny O
- Like a Stranger (EP), an EP by Kitten
- "Like a Stranger", a song by The Psychedelic Furs from the album Mirror Moves
- "Like a Stranger", a song by Kitten from their self-titled album
- "Like a Stranger", a song by Fine Young Cannibals from their self-titled album

== See also ==
- "Like Strangers", a song popularized by The Everly Brothers in 1960
