= Battle Royale =

Battle Royale may refer to:

- Battle royale, or battle royal, a fight among many combatants
  - Battle royal (professional wrestling)

== Fiction and literature ==
- Battle royale genre, a narrative genre of films, manga, anime and visual novels inspired by the 2000 film Battle Royale
- Battle Royal High School, a manga series published from 1986 to 1989
- "Battle Royal", a section of the 1952 novel Invisible Man, originally published on its own in 1947
- "Battle Royal", a title in Sonic the Hedgehog comics, published in 1997

=== Battle Royale franchise ===
- Battle Royale (novel), a 1999 Japanese novel
- Battle Royale (film), a 2000 film adaptation of the 1999 novel
- Battle Royale II: Requiem, a 2003 sequel to the 2000 film
- Battle Royale (manga), a 2000–2005 manga series adaptation of the 1999 novel
- Battle Royale II: Blitz Royale, a 2003 manga series based on Battle Royale II: Requiem

== Games ==
- Battle Royale (Magic: The Gathering), a collection of trading cards

=== Video games ===
- Battle royale game, a video game genre
- Kirby Battle Royale, a 2017 fighting game
- Fortnite Battle Royale, a 2017 shooter game
- Pac-Man Battle Royale, a 2011 arcade game
- PlayStation All-Stars Battle Royale, a 2012 fighting game
- Yu-Gi-Oh! Rush Duel: Dawn of the Battle Royale!!, a 2021 digital collectible card game based on the Yu-Gi-Oh! Sevens anime series

== Music ==
- The Battle Royale, an electronic dance group
- "Battle Royale" (The Word Alive song)
- "Battle Royale", a song by Does It Offend You, Yeah? from You Have No Idea What You're Getting Yourself Into

== Other uses ==
- "Battle Royale" (American Horror Story), an episode from a television series American Horror Story: Hotel
- "Battle Royale", a 2012 Judge John Hodgman podcast episode
