= A Glimpse Inside the Mind of Charles Swan III (soundtrack) =

2013 soundtrack album by Liam Hayes

A Glimpse Inside The Mind Of Charles Swan III (Music From The Motion Picture)

Soundtrack album by Liam Hayes
- Released: 2013
- Recorded: 2013
- Label: Night Fever Music
- Producers: Liam Hayes; Pat Sansone; Tom Lunt; Nathan Cook (producer)

Liam Hayes chronology
Bright Penny (2009)	A Glimpse Inside The Mind Of Charles Swan III (Music From The Motion Picture) (2013)	Korp Sole Roller (2014)

A Glimpse Inside The Mind Of Charles Swan III (Music From The Motion Picture) is a soundtrack album by American artist Liam Hayes, released March 19, 2013. It is the musical companion piece to the film A Glimpse Inside the Mind of Charles Swan III. The album features original compositions written specifically for the film as well as music from Hayes' previously released studio albums.

== Track listing ==
1. "Brain Doctor"
2. "Whose Blues"
3. "Sound Of San Francisco"
4. "White Telescope"
5. "Kirby's Song"
6. "Cried A Thousand Times"
7. "Born Together"
8. "SSBB / Counter SSBB Suite"
9. "The Goose Is Out"
10. "Fokus"
11. "Whose Blues Anyway"
12. "Look Up, Look Down"
13. "Rock And Roll"
14. "A Glimpse Inside"
15. "So Much Music"
16. "Aguas De Marco"
17. "First Meeting"
18. "Charlie And Izzy"
19. "Whose Blues Bus"
20. "Country Western Song"
21. "What's Inside"
