= Ian M. Anderson =

American entrepreneur (born 1985)

Ian Anderson
- Born: January 6, 1985
- Origin: Minneapolis, Minnesota, United States
- Genres: Indie rock
- Instrument: Guitar
- Years active: 2003 – present
- Label: Afternoon Records
- Member of: One for the Team; Aneuretical

Ian Anderson is an American entrepreneur who founded The Afternoon Company, which includes the record label Afternoon Records.

== Background ==
Anderson started his own recording label, Afternoon Records, after graduating high school that evolved into The Afternoon Company, which is composed of Afternoon Records, Afternoon Printing, The Math Team Agency, Mead Hall Games & Comics, The Meadery, HeroesHearth, Swim Agency, Beta Beta Duh Media, and MFR Presents. He's known in the national independent music scene for signing promising young musicians, such as Yellow Ostrich (Barsuk), Haley Bonar, Sissy Wish (Sony BMG), Now, Now (Trans Records), Night Moves (Domino), We Shot The Moon, Mouthful of Bees, The Poison Control Center, We All Have Hooks For Hands and Bad Bad Hats.

Anderson was the founding member of Minneapolis angular indie band Aneuretical in his teens and later One for the Team who released four albums on Afternoon Records, Warner Music and Militia Group. Anderson is behind the popular music blog MFR and wrote a book, "Here Come The Regulars," which was published by Farrar Straus on October 20, 2009 and has been adopted in the United States as canon in Music Business secondary education. Anderson has a new band called Dream Brother that has appeared in several movies and television shows.

In 2012, Anderson opened Mead Hall Games & Comics in downtown Minneapolis. He went on to found The Meadery, a Magic: the Gathering social network, in the fall of 2013.

Anderson was the Music Coordinator for Fallout 4, which was released in November 2015.
