= Nathan Cook (producer) =

- Born: Kade Nathaniel Scott Cook; Indianapolis, Indiana, U.S.
- Occupations: Recording engineer, musician, producer
- Instruments: Drums, guitar, bass, piano
- Years active: 2009-present

Kade Nathaniel 'Nathan' Cook is an American record producer, multi-instrumentalist, and arranger.

His discography includes production work for Liam Hayes, and The Poison Control Center.

== Production credits (As 'Nathan Cook') ==
Year	Album	Artist
2009	Raccoo-oo-oon	Raccoo-oo-oon
2011	Stranger Ballet	The Poison Control Center
2012	Heart Explosion	Sam Vicari
2013	A Glimpse Inside the Mind of Charles Swan III (Music From the Motion Picture)	Liam Hayes
2014	Korp Sole Roller	Liam Hayes
2014	Tomorrow	Hushdrops
2015	Slurrup	Liam Hayes
