= Nathan Cook =

Nathan Cook may refer to:

- Nathan A. Cook, Vice Chancellor of the Delaware Court of Chancery
- Nathan Cook (actor) (1950–1988), American actor
- Nathan Cook (producer), American record producer
- Nathan E. Cook (1885–1992), U.S. Navy veteran
