= Build It Up =

Studio album by One for the Team
- Released: 2008
- Recorded: 2008
- Genre: Indie rock
- Length: 38:59
- Label: Militia Group and Afternoon Records
- Producer: Militia Group and

One for the Team chronology
Good Boys Don't Make Noise (2006)	Build It Up (2008)	Build a Garden (2009)

Professional ratings
Review scores
Source	Rating
AbsolutePunk	link

Build It Up is a full-length album released by indie rock band One for the Team based out of Minneapolis, Minnesota. The album was recorded in April 2008 at Fur Seal Studios with Rob Skoro and Joe Johnson and subsequently released jointly on Militia Group and Afternoon Records labels in 2008.

One for the Team "Best Supporting Actor" (2008)
19 second sample from One for the Team's second track off of Build It Up.

== Track listing ==
1. "Apples"
2. "Best Supporting Actor"
3. "Dress Up Party"
4. "A Better Job"
5. "Build It Up"
6. "Hey Kid"
7. "Questions and Panthers"
8. "You Know Culture"
9. "Deconstruction Site"
10. "What Are You Gonna Cry About?"
11. "Oh No"
12. "We Can Work It Out"
