= Afternoon Records =

American record label

- Parent company: Warner Music Group
- Founded: 2003
- Founder: Ian Anderson, Michael M. Sandstedt
- Genre: Indie rock
- Country of origin: U.S.
- Location: Minneapolis, Minnesota
- Official website: www.afternoonrecords.com

Afternoon Records is an American indie rock record label based in Minneapolis, Minnesota. The label was founded by Ian Anderson and Michael M. Sandstedt in 2003, the year Anderson graduated from high school. He wanted to create a platform for his high school band Aneuretical and others. Afternoon Records is distributed by Warner Music Group.

Ian Anderson's own band One for the Team was on the label.

== Bands ==
=== Current bands ===
- Bad Bad Hats
- Dolfish
- John Vanderslice
- One for the Team
- Poison Control Center
- Pomegranates
- Sissy Wish
- Tarlton
- Ten Centuries
- We All Have Hooks For Hands
- Yellow Ostrich
- Volcanoes
- Statistics

Past bands

- A Night In The Box
- A False Notion
- Aneuretical
- The Battle Royale
- The Coast
- Crescent Moon is in Big Trouble
- Ela
- God Damn Doo Wop Band
- Haley Bonar
- Hello Blue
- I, Colossus
- Kurmudgeon
- Linus
- Look Down
- Mouthful of Bees
- Night Moves
- Now, Now
- The Plagiarists
- Red Fox Grey Fox
- Spiritual Mansions
- Squareshooters
- Superdanger
- Target Market
- Topwise
- Towers Thick Walls
- Viceburgh
- The Wars of 1812
- We Shot The Moon
- Young Dudes

== Discography ==
- AR075 The Poison Control Center - Stranger Ballet (06/07/2011)
- AR074 Dolfish - Your Love Is Bummin' Me Out (June 2011)
- AR073 We All Have Hooks for Hands - Girls EP
- AR072 Yellow Ostrich - The Mistress
- AR071 Pomegranates - One of Us
- AR070 The Poison Control Center - Sad Sour Future
- AR069 Tarlton - Evergreens
- AR068 One for the Team - Hard for You
- AR067 One for the Team - Ghosts
- AR066 Ten Centuries - White Pines
- AR065 Afternoon Records - Autumn Mixtape 2009
- AR064 We Shot the Moon - A Silver Lining
- AR063 We Shot the Moon - The Bright Side
- AR062 John Vanderslice - Pixel Revolt (Vinyl Reissue)
- AR061 John Vanderslice - Cellar Door (Vinyl Reissue)
- AR060 John Vanderslice - Life and Death of an American Fourtracker (Vinyl Reissue)
- AR059 John Vanderslice - Time Travel Is Lonely (Vinyl Reissue)
- AR058 We All Have Hooks for Hands - The Shape of Energy
- AR057 Sissy Wish - Beauties Never Die
- AR056 Target Market - Up on the Moon
- AR055 Mouthful of Bees - Mouthful of Bees
- AR054 The Coast - Expatriate
- AR053 One for the Team - Build a Garden EP
- AR052 Tarlton - The Papa These EP
- AR051 Aneuretical - When You Were A Kid (reissue)
- AR050 Hail On - A compilation celebrating the release of 50 records, 2003–2008
- AR049 The Poison Control Center - Make Love a Star EP
- AR048 Now, Now Every Children - Cars
- AR047 Spiritual Mansions - Touched
- AR046 The Poison Control Center - Give It a Try/When the World Sleeps 7"
- AR045 One for the Team - Build It Up
- AR044 Haley Bonar - Big Star
- AR043 A Night in the Box - Write a Letter
- AR042 Now, Now Every Children - In the City EP
- AR041 The Wars of 1812 - Status Quo Ante Bellum
- AR040 Crescent Moon Is In Big Trouble - Crescent Moon Is in Big Trouble EP
- AR039 Now, Now Every Children - Not One, But Two EP
- AR038 The Battle Royale - Wake Up, Thunderbabe
- AR037 I, Colossus - I, Colossus
- AR036 The Poison Control Center - A Collage of Impressions
- AR035 Young Dudes - Young Dudes LP
- AR034 The Poison Control Center - Glory Us EP
- AR033 Spiritual Mansions - Give Us Your Hearts
- AR032 We All Have Hooks For Hands - The Pretender
- AR031 Mouthful of Bees - The End
- AR030 Ela - Real Blood on Fake Trees
- AR029 Target Market - No Thrills
- AR028 Haley Bonar - Lure the Fox
- AR027 A Night in the Box - The Hustle, The Prayer, The Thief
- AR026 The Battle Royale - Sparkledust Fantasy
- AR025 The God Damn Doo Wop Band - Broken Hearts
- AR024 The Squareshooters - I Am the Keeper
- AR023 Aneuretical - Million Dollar Man
- AR022 One for the Team - Good Boys Don't Make Noise
- AR021 The Plagiarists - Veto!
- AR020 Viceburgh - Intense Excitement
- AR019 Superdanger - Fight Fight Fight
- AR018 Linus - Championships are won in the off-season
- AR017 The Squareshooters - ...Get Kick Out of High School
- AR016 Look Down - 24/7 Dance Force
- AR015 Hello Blue - What It Takes to Wake Up
- AR014 Towers Thick Walls - Towers Thick Walls
- AR013 Superdanger - Superdanger (EP)
- AR012 A False Notion - Somewhere Between Sleep and Awake
- AR011 Aneuretical - When You Were a Kid
- AR010 Kurmudgeon - Cables & Ties
- AR009 Look Down - The American Hustle (EP)
- AR008 Afternoon Records Compilation
- AR007 Aneuretical - Albumone
- AR006 The New Renaissance - The Sting of Revolution
- AR005 Nero - Nero
- AR004 Peace, Love & The Common Cold - Tanning in the Headlights (EP)
- AR003 Aneuretical - Can You Sleep Without Waking Up (EP)
- AR002 Topwise - Topwise (EP)
- AR001 The Genepicks - Weekend at Genepicks

== See also ==
- List of record labels
