= Cut It Out =

Cut It Out may refer to:

- Cut It Out (book), a book by artist Banksy
- Cut It Out (EP), an EP by Kitten
- "Cut It Out" (song), a song by The Go-Betweens from the album Tallulah
- "Cut It Out", a song by Nelly from the album Brass Knuckles
