= More You Becomes You =

Studio album by Plush
- Released: September 8, 1998
- Recorded: 1997
- Genre: Indie rock
- Length: 28:58
- Label: Domino; Drag City
- Producer: Liam Hayes

Plush chronology
More You Becomes You (1998)	Fed (2002)

Professional ratings
Review scores
Source	Rating
AllMusic	4.5/5 stars
Entertainment Weekly	B
The Guardian	4/5 stars
The List	4/5 stars
NME	8/10
Q	3/5 stars
Select	4/5
The Village Voice	C+

More You Becomes You is the debut studio album by American musician Liam Hayes, released under his stage name Plush on September 8, 1998 on the Drag City label in the United States and on the Domino label in Europe.

In 2012, More You Becomes You was cited as an influence by Destroyer's Dan Bejar.

== Recording ==
More You Becomes You's songs feature mournful pianos, sweeping arrangements, plaintive emotional confessionals, and delicate vocal harmonies. For the album, Hayes abandoned the electric arrangements of his debut single "Found a Little Baby" in favor of simple piano arrangements and a more raw approach to production, with much of the album being recorded by Hayes on a tape machine installed by his piano. At one point, Hayes can be heard "giggling mischievously as he misses the high notes of a delicate '(I Didn't Know) I Was Asleep'".

== Track listing ==
All tracks are written by Liam Hayes.

No.	Title	Length
1.	"Virginia"	2:07
2.	"More You Becomes You"	4:48
3.	"(I Didn't Know) I was Asleep"	2:45
4.	"The Party I"	0:30
5.	"The Party II"	0:30
6.	"Soaring and Boring"	3:12
7.	"(See It in the) Early Morning"	4:05
8.	"Instrumental"	3:06
9.	"Save the People"	2:12
10.	"The Sailor"	5:43
