= Fed (album) =

Studio album by Plush
- Released: December 23, 2002
- Recorded: 2000–02
- Genre: Indie rock
- Length: 48:30
- Label: After Hours
- Producer: Liam Hayes

Plush chronology
More You Becomes You (1998)	Fed (2002)	Bright Penny (2009)

Fed is the second studio album by American musician Liam Hayes, released under his stage name Plush on December 23, 2002 on the record label After Hours exclusively in Japan. The album was belatedly released in Europe by Broken Horse Records on August 25, 2008, receiving highly positive reviews from music critics.

== Recording ==
An early version of the Fed song "No Education" was released as a single in 1997. Formal recording sessions for Fed were started in early 2000, with engineers Bob Weston and Steve Albini and Konrad Strauss contributing to the recording. Weston stated:

Liam likes to record in an older style. He bought himself this 1/2" 4-track tape machine, an Ampex 440, that he carts around. I helped him rebuild the thing and made it sound pretty good. So we cart it around and record on location. We recorded at a film sound-stage. We recorded in his practice space. We recorded at this public radio station and on a rooftop in downtown Chicago. Steve Albini has recorded him in a huge theater. The microphone practice is being done in a really minimal style and I try to follow Liam's "Old School" aesthetic. We are doing the basic tracks, guitar, bass, and drums. He is going to do a reduction mix using Ping-pong recording techniques from the 4-track tape onto a 1" 8 track tape machine that Steve Albini has, and do overdubs at Steve's studio.

Shortly after the sessions with Bob Weston, the album's recording was moved to Electrical Audio, with Steve Albini and Konrad Strauss taking over engineering and recording duties. Arranger Tom Tom MMLXXXIV, who had worked with Earth, Wind & Fire, Loleatta Holloway, and Minnie Riperton among others, was brought in to provide full band arrangements. An incredible amount of time was put into the recording and arrangement of the music being developed. The end result was an album full of ornamented arrangements with full horn sections married to rock band arrangements.

== Critical reception ==
Professional ratings
Aggregate scores
Source	Rating
Metacritic	89/100
Review scores
Source	Rating
AllMusic	4.5/5 stars
The Guardian	5/5 stars
The Irish Times	4/5 stars
Mojo	4/5 stars
NME	8/10
Pitchfork	6.9/10
Q	4/5 stars
Record Collector	4/5 stars
Stylus Magazine	A
Uncut	5/5 stars

Upon being re-released in 2008, Fed was well-received by music critics. The album holds a score of 89 out of 100 on the review aggregator website Metacritic, indicating "universal acclaim".

== Track listing ==
All songs written by Liam Hayes.

1. "Whose Blues" – 5:04
2. "I've Changed My Number" – 3:33
3. "Blown Away" – 3:03
4. "So Blind" – 3:20
5. "Greyhound Bus Station" – 2:49
6. "No Education" – 5:22
7. "Sound of S.F." – 3:33
8. "Born Together" – 2:53
9. "Unis" – 0:26
10. "Whose Blues Anyway" – 1:35
11. "What'll We Do" – 3:03
12. "Having It All" – 4:03
13. "Fed Intro" – 6:50
14. "Fed" – 6:50
15. "The Woods" – 2:56
