= Now, Now =

American indie rock duo

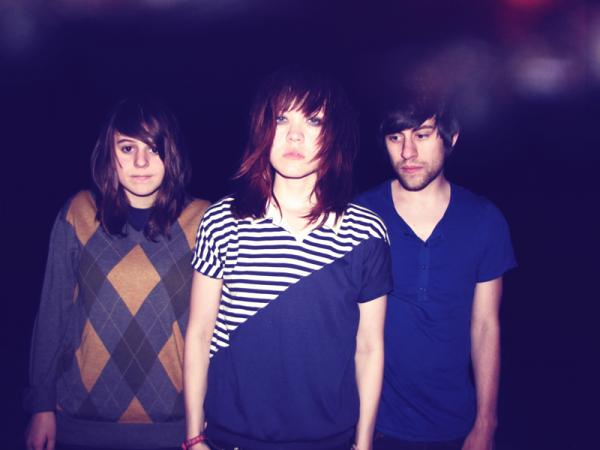
- Now, Now in 2011

Background information
- Origin: Blaine, Minnesota, US
- Genres: Indie pop; indie rock
- Years active: 2003–present
- Labels: Tapete; Afternoon (2007–2010); No Sleep (2010–2011); Trans-Records (2011–present); LAB (2017–present)
- Members: Cacie Dalager; Bradley Hale
- Past members: Justin Schweim; Britty Hale; Christine Sako; Jess Abbott
- Website: nownow.band

Now, Now (known as Now, Now Every Children from 2003 to 2010) is an American indie rock duo formed in Blaine, Minnesota, and based in Minneapolis. It consists of Cacie "KC Rae" Dalager (vocals, guitar, keyboard) and Bradley Hale (drums, backing vocals).

As of 2025, they have released three studio albums, four EPs, two remix albums, and a number of singles.

== History ==
=== Formation and early lineup (2003–2006) ===
Now, Now was formed by classmates and high school marching bandmates Cacie Dalager and Bradley Hale in 2003, when they were both sixteen years old. Their name was an in-joke resulting from a typo in an online chat. Now, Now's first song was an acoustic track dedicated to a college-bound friend, which they posted on Myspace. The band previously included Brad's sister Britty Hale on keyboards, school friend Justin Schweim on bass, and later Christine Sako on bass.

=== Afternoon Records and Cars (2007–2009) ===
In 2007, Now, Now signed to local Minneapolis-based independent record label Afternoon Records, founded by a friend, Ian Anderson. They recorded and released two EPs on the label, Not One, But Two (2008) and In the City (2009). In September 2008, Now, Now opened for Mates of State in Minneapolis. Anderson produced their full-length debut album, Cars, released on February 27, 2009, via Tapete Records. The band played the Bamboozle festival on May 3, 2009, and supported Paramore on their Brand New Eyes World Tour in Europe in December. Jess Abbott, now Tancred, joined Now, Now that year.

=== Neighbors, Threads, and live performances (2010–2014) ===
In April 2010, Now, Now left Afternoon Records, and they shortened their name from Now, Now Every Children to simply Now, Now. Dalager explained to Spin: "We felt like we needed to disconnect ourselves from any childish image we had. It was a way of starting over and simplifying things for us." Under their new name, they self-produced an EP titled Neighbors, which was digitally released in September 2010 and re-released in December, after the band signed with No Sleep Records.

In 2011, Now, Now was the opening act for Hellogoodbye, along with Jukebox the Ghost, You, Me, and Everyone We Know, and Gold Motel. They were also scheduled to be one of the support acts for Fake Problems on their 2011 tour but pulled out to prepare new material for their next full-length record. In May, they released a collection of remixes of Neighbors tracks, called Neighbors: The Remixes. In December, they signed to Chris Walla's Trans Record Label—an imprint of Atlantic, and their second album, Threads, produced by Howard Redekopp, came out in March 2012.

In April 2012, Now, Now was the opening act for the US tour of the Naked and Famous. In September, they embarked on a seven-date run of the UK and supported Motion City Soundtrack on most of their UK and US tour dates.

Now, Now made their television debut on Late Night with Jimmy Fallon in November 2012, performing the song "Thread".

In early 2013, the band joined To Write Love on Her Arms on their Heavy and Light US tour.

=== Return from hiatus and Saved (2017–present) ===
In May 2017, Now, Now released "SGL", their first song in five years, and announced their first tour in four years. They also amicably parted ways with Abbott, continuing as a duo. "SGL" was ranked seventh on NPR's "100 Best Songs of 2017". In September, Now, Now issued another single, "Yours". In November, they performed at a Tiny Desk Concert.

In March 2018, the band released the single "AZ", and their new album, Saved, came out in May. Their next single, "MJ", came out the same month and was ranked 57th on NPR's "100 Best Songs of 2018".

In April 2019, Now, Now published a new song, "Enda", and they toured with Foxing through April and May. In December, they issued "Lonely Christmas", an original Christmas song.

In 2023, KC Rae released her debut solo album, titled Think I'm Gonna Die. In 2024, Now, Now collaborated with Ber on her third EP, Room for You.

== Band members ==
Current

- Acacia "KC" Dalager – vocals, guitars, keyboards (2003–present)
- Bradley Hale – drums, percussion, backing vocals (2003–present)

Past

- Jess Abbott – guitars, backing vocals (2009–2017)

Former live members

- Britty Hale – keyboards (2008–2009)
- Justin Schweim – bass (2008)
- Christine Sako – bass (2008–2011)

== Discography ==
=== Albums ===
- Cars (2009)
- Threads (2012)
- Saved (2018)

=== EPs ===
- Not One, But Two (2008)
- In the City (2008)
- Neighbors (2010)
- Dead Oaks (2012)
- 01 (2025)

=== Remix albums ===
- Neighbors: The Remixes (2011)
- Threads Remixed (2014)

=== Singles ===
- "Dead Oaks" (2012)
- "SGL" (2017)
- "Yours" (2017)
- "AZ" (2018)
- "MJ" (2018)
- "Enda" (2019)
- "Lonely Christmas' (2019)

=== Music videos ===
- "Thread" (2012)
- "SGL" (2017)
- "Yours" (2017)
- "AZ" (2018)
- "MJ" (2018)
- "Enda" (2019)
