= Tom Lunt =

American record producer

Tom Lunt is an American record producer. Lunt formed The Numero Group record label with fellow Chicagoan Ken Shipley in February 2003, and the label has gone on to reissue hundreds of lost soul, gospel, funk and psychedelic rock albums. Lunt co-produced and art directed the label's first 32 releases before retiring in April 2013 at 61 to work with musicians outside the reissue realm.

Before The Numero Group, from 1988 to 2000, Lunt was a VP/creative director at the Leo Burnett Worldwide advertising agency, and creative director at Corporate Profiles, DDB, Warsaw, Poland, in 2001. Prior to that, he worked for Streetside Records in St Louis as a buyer.

In 2006, Lunt co-produced with Liam Hayes and performed on the album Bright Penny by Liam Hayes and Plush.

Lunt was nominated twice for a Grammy Award, in 2011 as art director for Numero 033, Light On The South Side, with photographs by Chicago photographer Michael Abramson, and in 2012 with Ken Shipley and then staff musicologist Rob Sevier as co-producer of Numero 032, Syl Johnson: Complete Mythology.

Post Numero, he produced the first album of music by photographer William Eggleston, '"Musik" (2017), released on Secretly Canadian. And is currently producing "512", an album of enhanced field recordings by the Memphis photographer for the same label. Lunt is also a photographer and visual artist [tomlunt.com] and performs as the guitarist in the Chicago band The James Dean Joint.
