= Threads (Now, Now album) =

Studio album by Now, Now
- Released: 2012
- Genre: Indie rock; indie pop; dream pop; ambient
- Length: 41:42
- Label: Trans Records
- Producer: Howard Redekopp

Now, Now chronology
Cars (2008)	Threads (2012)	Saved (2018)

Professional ratings
Review scores
Source	Rating
Consequence of Sound	C+

Threads is the second studio album by the indie rock band Now, Now, formerly known as Now, Now Every Children. It was released in 2012 on Trans Records. It is the first album under the band's new name. It was recorded in Vancouver, British Columbia in 2011.

== Track listing ==
No.	Title	Length
1.	"The Pull"	1:48
2.	"Prehistoric"	3:52
3.	"Lucie, Too"	3:43
4.	"Dead Oaks"	1:41
5.	"Oh. Hi."	3:29
6.	"But I Do"	2:51
7.	"Separate Rooms"	3:46
8.	"Thread"	3:44
9.	"Wolf"	4:26
10.	"School Friends"	2:53
11.	"Colony"	4:20
12.	"Magnet"	5:09
Total length:		41:42
