= Stranger Ballet =

Studio album by the Poison Control Center
- Released: June 7, 2011
- Recorded: January 3–8, 2011
- Genre: Rock
- Length: 35:03
- Label: Afternoon Records
- Producer: Nathan Cook (producer), the Poison Control Center

The Poison Control Center chronology
Sad Sour Future (2010)	Stranger Ballet (2011)

Professional ratings
Review scores
Source	Rating
The A.V. Club	(A−)
Pitchfork	(7.6/10)

Stranger Ballet is the sixth studio album by American musical group the Poison Control Center, released on June 7, 2011.

The album was recorded and produced in Chicago by the Poison Control Center and Nathan Cook (producer), with Mike Dixon co-engineering. The album was mixed by A.J. Mogis in Omaha Nebraska.

== Track listing ==
1. "Torpedoes On Tuesday"
2. "Some Ordinary Vision"
3. "A Thousand Colors"
4. "Dracula's Casket"
5. "Seagull"
6. "Underground Bed"
7. "Born On Date"
8. "Porcelain Brain"
9. "Church On Mars"
10. "Terminal"
11. "Reoccurring Kind"
