= Slurrup =

Studio album by Liam Hayes
- Released: January 13, 2015
- Recorded: 2010–2013
- Genre: Rock
- Length: 33:13
- Label: Fat Possum
- Producer: Nathan Cook (producer), Liam Hayes

Liam Hayes chronology
Korp Sole Roller (2013)	Slurrup (2015)

Professional ratings
Aggregate scores
Source	Rating
Metacritic	72/100
Review scores
Source	Rating
AllMusic	4/5 stars
Pitchfork Media	7.3/10.0

Slurrup is the fifth studio album by American artist Liam Hayes, released in January 2015. It is full of short and tight songs with searing double tracked guitars and odd keyboards, which contrasts with the expansive, ornate pop of his previous album, Korp Sole Roller. Liam Hayes and Nathan Cook produced the album together in Chicago. The pair loaded the album with clever production flourishes, including phasing effects, backwards chords, echo, generous use of reverb on the guitars, and occasional orchestral backing tracks.

== Background and recording ==
In a 2015 interview with the Chicagoist magazine, Hayes discussed the creation of the album:

"I've always liked rock'n'roll, so I'm kind of going back to things that I really liked in the past but had never thought of as a valid way to present my songs. I kind of wanted to reconnect with some of the things I liked when I started out with music as a kid. You know things like rock'n'roll and pranks and magic. It's actually what my first album might have sounded like if I had made an album before I made my first single.

I've done a lot of things on records in a lot of different ways, but I've never done anything that might be considered scaled-back, or rudimentary, or raw. However, as much as the band is the center of this album, we didn't just turn on some mics and bang out the tunes. Just because it doesn't immediately sound densely layered, it doesn't mean that the songs aren't well arranged. The overdubs on Slurrup are closer to supporting the overall sound of the band, which is something that Nathan and I really worked hard on. I really wanted this album to sound and feel more like a band, and I think that we were able to do that. I think we were able to capture that sense of interaction that happens when people play together in a room and not bury it under too much other stuff."

In spite of the record being closer to the sound of three people in a room, Hayes and his companions on Slurrup - John San Juan on bass and Eric Reidleberger on drums, found ways to replicate a layered sound with a stripped down band. For example, San Juan's bass lines are more like counter melodies rather than a simple driving force."

"When you're doing something like what we did with less instrumentation, the challenge is to imply the other things that need to be there without overdoing it," Hayes explained. "It really helped a lot for John to not just play the bottom root notes or the fifths on the bass, but to add in counter melodies to make it work.""

Slurrup is full of strange instrumental interludes and surreal yet humorous sound collages. Channel 44 contains three minutes of what sounds like an amusement park ride from the other side, and the album ends with the sound of something slurping from a bowl.

== Track listing ==
Side One

1. "Slurrup"
2. "One Way Out"
3. "Nothing Wrong"
4. "Get It Right"
5. "Theme From Mindball"
6. "Fokus"
7. "Greenfield"

Side Two

1. "Keys To Heaven"
2. "Long Day"
3. "Channel 44"
4. "Outhouse"
5. "August Fourteen"
6. "Fight Magic With Magic"
