= One of Us (Pomegranates album) =

Studio album by Pomegranates
- Released: October 26, 2010
- Genre: Alternative rock, indie rock
- Length: 44:49
- Label: Afternoon Records
- Producer: TJ Lipple

Pomegranates chronology
| Everybody Come Outside (2009) | One of Us (2010) | Heaven (2012) |

One of Us is the third studio album by the Cincinnati indie rock group Pomegranates, released October 26, 2010, on Afternoon Records. It was produced by TJ Lipple of Aloha.

== Critical reception ==
One of Us received mostly positive reviews. Giving the album 7/10, William Goodman of Spin declares "All 13 kaleidoscopic tracks, particularly standout 'Anywhere You Go,' a supercollider of rhythmic groove, guitar, and Wurlitzer organ, distill a decade-plus of indie and alt rock into a sparking art-pop swell. Spazzing out, Joey Cook cries: 'I really like you!' The feeling's mutual." Filter's Kurt Orzeck gives the album 85% and touts they perform "with a masterful ease, smoothly maneuvering from oversize spectacle to small-scale minimalism. It’ll reel you in with authority—and you’ll beg, 'Please don’t let me go.'” In a less favorable review, Dylan Nelson of PopMatters gives the album 5/10 and says "the album’s uptempo polish invigorates the band’s sound but ultimately fails to mesh with its wistful tendencies."

== Track listing ==
All songs written by Pomegranates

| No. | Title | Length |
|---|---|---|
| 1. | "One of Us" | 5:20 |
| 2. | "50's" | 2:33 |
| 3. | "White Fawn" | 2:06 |
| 4. | "Prouncer" | 3:46 |
| 5. | "Perception" | 3:17 |
| 6. | "Create Your Own Reality" | 4:38 |
| 7. | "Anywhere You Go" | 5:44 |
| 8. | "Between Two Dreams" | 2:40 |
| 9. | "The Positive Light" | 4:30 |
| 10. | "Demond" | 2:53 |
| 11. | "Venus" | 1:58 |
| 12. | "Skull Cakin'" | 3:16 |
| 13. | "Into the Water, Into the Air" | 2:08 |

== Personnel ==
Pomegranates

- Joey Cook – Bass, Guitar, Keyboards, Percussion, Vocals
- Isaac Karns – Bass, Guitar, Keyboards, Sampling, Vocals
- Jacob Merritt – Drums, Percussion
- Dan Lyon – Bass, Guitar, Vocals

Additional personnel

- Alisa Cook – Flute, Vocals
- Nigel Evan Dennis – Artwork
- Ric Hordinski – Engineer, Guitar
- Chris Leeds – Assistant
- TJ Lipple – Engineer, Marimba, Mastering, Mixing, Producer
- Paul Patterson − String Arrangements, Strings
- Matthew Shelton − Vocals
