= Pomegranates (band) =

Indie rock band from Cincinnati, Ohio

- Origin: Cincinnati, Ohio, US
- Genres: Indie rock Indie pop
- Years active: 2007–2013, 2015–2020
- Labels: Lujo Records (2006-2009); Afternoon Records (2010-2011); Modern Outsider (2012-2014); Winspear (2015)
- Members: Joey Cook; Isaac Karns; Jacob Merritt; Pierce Geary
- Past members: Karl Spaeth; Josh Kufeldt; Daniel Lyon; Curt Kiser

Pomegranates are an indie rock band from Cincinnati, Ohio. They briefly changed their name to Healing Power before disbanding, but they reverted to Pomegranates when reforming the band.

== Members ==
=== Current ===
- Joey Cook: vocals, bass, guitars, keyboards
- Isaac Karns: vocals, bass, guitars, keyboards
- Jacob Merritt: drums
- Pierce Geary: bass, keys, vocals

=== Former ===
- Karl Spaeth: guitars, bass
- Josh Kufeldt: guitars, bass
- Daniel Lyon: vocals, guitars
- Curt Kiser: guitars, bass, vocals

== Discography ==
=== Studio albums ===
- Everything Is Alive (Lujo Records), 2008
- Everybody Come Outside (Lujo Records), 2009
- One of Us (Afternoon Records), 2010
- Heaven (Modern Outsider), 2012
- Healing Power (Winspear), 2015

=== EPs ===
- Two Eyes (Lujo Records), 2007
- In Your Face Thieves/Chestnut Attic (Lujo Records), 2011

Singles

- Corriander b/w Sleepover (Lujo Records), 2009
