= Saved (Now, Now album) =

Studio album by Now, Now
- Released: May 18, 2018
- Genres: Indie pop; dream pop; indie rock; ambient; synth-pop
- Length: 45:37
- Labels: Trans Records; LAB Records
- Producers: Bradley Hale; Chris Walla

Now, Now chronology
| Threads (2012) | Saved (2018) |

Saved is the third studio album by the indie rock band Now, Now. It was released on May 18, 2018 on Trans Records. It is the band's first album in six years, and also their first album since the departure of guitarist and background vocalist Jess Abbott in 2017.

== Background and recording ==
In 2014, the band announced that they were in the process of writing a new record.

On May 8, 2017, the band deleted all previous content from their Twitter and Facebook page and posted a short teaser video. No comments were provided with the video. Furthermore, the band's new homepage nownowmusic.com was opened. The following day an eight-date US Summer tour was announced - their first since 2013.

On May 11, 2017, the band released a new single, "SGL". It was also announced that Jess Abbott amicably parted ways with the band. The band released another single, "Yours," on September 15, 2017. The band released a third single, AZ, on March 1, 2018, along with announcing the title of the new album, and the release date.

The band announced a pre-order and revealed the track listing on March 23, 2018, through their social media and official store.

== Reception ==
The album has received positive reviews from music critics.

== Track listing ==
| No. | Title | Length |
|---|---|---|
| 1. | "SGL" | 3:13 |
| 2. | "MJ" | 3:52 |
| 3. | "Can't Help Myself" | 3:44 |
| 4. | "AZ" | 3:35 |
| 5. | "Window" | 3:21 |
| 6. | "Holy Water" | 4:37 |
| 7. | "Yours" | 4:11 |
| 8. | "Saved" | 3:05 |
| 9. | "Knowme" | 3:24 |
| 10. | "Drive" | 4:07 |
| 11. | "Set It Free" | 3:29 |
| 12. | "P0WDER" | 4:59 |
| Total length: | | 45:37 |
