= William Eggleston =

American photographer (born 1939)

- Born: July 27, 1939 (age 87); Memphis, Tennessee, U.S.
- Known for: Photography
- Notable work: William Eggleston's Guide (1976); The Democratic Forest (1989); The Red Ceiling
- Spouse: Rosa Dossett (m. 1964, died 2015)
- Children: 3
- Website: www.egglestonartfoundation.org

William Eggleston (born July 27, 1939) is an American photographer. He is widely credited with increasing recognition of color photography as a legitimate artistic medium. Eggleston's books include William Eggleston's Guide (1976) and The Democratic Forest (1989).

Eggleston received a Guggenheim Fellowship in 1974, the Hasselblad Award in 1998, and Honorary Fellowship of the Royal Photographic Society in 2003.

== Early life and education ==
William Eggleston was born in Memphis, Tennessee, USA and raised in Sumner, Mississippi. His father was an engineer and his mother was the daughter of a prominent local judge. As a boy, Eggleston was introverted; he enjoyed playing the piano, drawing, and working with electronics. From an early age, he was also drawn to visual media and reportedly enjoyed buying postcards and cutting out pictures from magazines.

At the age of 15, Eggleston was sent to the boarding school, the Webb School. Eggleston later recalled few fond memories of the school, telling a reporter, "It had a kind of Spartan routine to 'build character'. I never knew what that was supposed to mean. It was so callous and dumb. It was the kind of place where it was considered effeminate to like music and painting." Eggleston was unusual among his peers in eschewing the traditional Southern male pursuits of hunting and sports, in favor of artistic pursuits and observation of the world. Nevertheless, Eggleston noted that he never felt like an outsider, telling a reporter that " I never had the feeling that I didn't fit in...But probably I didn't."

Eggleston attended Vanderbilt University for a year, Delta State College for a semester, and the University of Mississippi for about five years, but did not complete any degree. Nonetheless, his interest in photography took root when a friend at Vanderbilt gave Eggleston a Leica camera. He was introduced to abstract expressionism at the university by visiting painter Tom Young.

== Photographic work ==
=== 1960s - discovering color photography ===
Eggleston's early photographic efforts were inspired by the work of Swiss-born photographer Robert Frank, and by French photographer Henri Cartier-Bresson's book, The Decisive Moment. He first photographed in black-and-white. However, in 1965 and 1966, Eggleston began experimenting with color after being introduced to the format by William Christenberry. By the late 1960s, color transparency film was his dominant medium.

Eggleston's development as a photographer seems to have taken place in relative isolation from other artists. In an interview, John Szarkowski describes his first encounter with the young Eggleston in 1969 as being "absolutely out of the blue". After reviewing Eggleston's work (which he recalled as a suitcase full of "drugstore" color prints) Szarkowski prevailed upon the Photography Committee of MoMA to buy one of Eggleston's photographs.

In 1970, Christenberry introduced him to Walter Hopps (director of Washington D.C.'s Corcoran Gallery). Hopps later reported being "stunned" by Eggleston's work: "I had never seen anything like it."

=== 1970s ===
From 1973 to 1974, Eggleston taught at Harvard. During these years, whilst examining the price list of a photographic lab in Chicago, he discovered dye-transfer printing. As Eggleston later recalled: "It advertised 'from the cheapest to the ultimate print.' The ultimate print was a dye transfer. I went straight up there to look and everything I saw was commercial work like pictures of cigarette packs or perfume bottles but the color saturation and the quality of the ink were overwhelming. I couldn't wait to see what a plain Eggleston picture would look like with the same process. Every photograph I subsequently printed with the process seemed fantastic and each one seemed better than the previous one." The dye-transfer process resulted in some of Eggleston's most striking and famous work, such as his 1973 photograph The Red Ceiling, of which Eggleston said, "The Red Ceiling is so powerful, that in fact, I've never seen it reproduced on the page to my satisfaction. When you look at the dye it is like red blood that's wet on the wall... A little red is usually enough, but to work with an entire red surface was a challenge."

At Harvard, Eggleston prepared his first portfolio, entitled 14 Pictures (1974).

In 1976, Eggleston's work was exhibited at MoMA. Although this was over three decades after MoMA had mounted a solo exhibition of color photographs by Eliot Porter, and a decade after MoMA had exhibited color photographs by Ernst Haas, the tale that the Eggleston exhibition was MoMA's first exhibition of color photography is frequently repeated, (Note: Two examples: "[Eggleston] managed to convince [MoMA] to grant him their very first one-man exhibition of color photography" (Jim Lewis, "Kodachrome Moment: How William Eggleston's revolutionary exhibition changed everything", Slate, February 10, 2003); "a controversial but revolutionary exhibition in 1976—MoMA's first solo show to feature color photographs—and a classic accompanying book, William Eggleston's Guide" ("William Eggleston: Democratic Camera, Photographs and Video, 1961–2008", Corcoran Gallery of Art, 2009).)and the 1976 show is regarded as a watershed moment in the history of photography, by marking "the acceptance of colour photography by the highest validating institution".

In 1976, Eggleston was introduced to Viva, the Andy Warhol "superstar", with whom he began a long relationship. During this period Eggleston became familiar with Andy Warhol's circle, a connection that may have helped foster Eggleston's idea of the "democratic camera", Mark Holborn suggests.

According to Philip Gefter from Art & Auction, "It is worth noting that Stephen Shore and William Eggleston, pioneers of color photography in the early 1970s, borrowed, consciously or not, from the photorealists. Their photographic interpretation of the American vernacular—gas stations, diners, parking lots—is foretold in photorealist paintings that preceded their pictures."

Some of his early series were not shown until the late 2000s. For example, The Nightclub Portraits (1973), a series of large black-and-white portraits in bars and clubs around Memphis was, for the most part, not shown until 2005. Lost and Found, part of Eggleston's Los Alamos series, is a body of photographs that have remained unseen for decades because until 2008 no one knew that they belonged to Walter Hopps. The works from this series chronicle road trips the artist took with Hopps, leaving from Memphis and traveling as far as the West Coast. Eggleston's Election Eve photographs were not editioned until 2011.

==== Experimentation with video ====
In the 1970s, Eggleston also experimented with video, producing several hours of roughly edited footage Eggleston called Stranded in Canton. Writer Richard Woodward called this footage a "demented home movie", mixing tender shots of his children at home with shots of drunken parties, public urination, and a man biting off a chicken's head before a cheering crowd in New Orleans. Woodward suggested that the film is reflective of Eggleston's "fearless naturalism—a belief that by looking patiently at what others ignore or look away from, interesting things can be seen."

=== 1980s ===
Eggleston also worked with filmmakers, photographing the set of John Huston's film Annie (1982) and documenting the making of David Byrne's film True Stories (1986).

=== 1990s - present ===
Eggleston's mature work is characterized by its ordinary subject matter. As Eudora Welty noted in her introduction to The Democratic Forest, an Eggleston photograph might include "old tires, Dr. Pepper machines, discarded air-conditioners, vending machines, empty and dirty Coca-Cola bottles, torn posters, power poles and power wires, street barricades, one-way signs, detour signs, No Parking signs, parking meters, and palm trees crowding the same curb."

Eudora Welty suggests that Eggleston sees the complexity and beauty of the mundane world: "The extraordinary, compelling, honest, beautiful and unsparing photographs all have to do with the quality of our lives in the everyday world: they succeed in showing us the grain of the present, like the cross-section of a tree... They focus on the mundane world. But no subject is fuller of implications than the mundane world!" Mark Holborn, in his introduction to Ancient and Modern, writes about the dark undercurrent of these mundane scenes as viewed through Eggleston's lens: "[Eggleston's] subjects are, on the surface, the ordinary inhabitants and environs of suburban Memphis and Mississippi—friends, family, barbecues, back yards, a tricycle and the clutter of the mundane. The normality of these subjects is deceptive, for behind the images there is a sense of lurking danger." American artist Edward Ruscha said of Eggleston's work, "When you see a picture he's taken, you're stepping into some kind of jagged world that seems like Eggleston World."

== Music ==
In 2017, an album of Eggleston's music was released, Musik. It comprises 13 "experimental electronic soundscapes", "often dramatic improvisations on compositions by Bach (his hero) and Handel as well as his singular takes on a Gilbert and Sullivan tune and the jazz standard On the Street Where You Live." Musik was made entirely on a 1980s Korg synthesizer, and recorded to floppy disks. The album was produced by Tom Lunt, and released on Secretly Canadian. In 2018, Áine O'Dwyer performed the music on a pipe organ at the Big Ears music festival in Knoxville, Tennessee.

He released two albums in total:

- Musik (Secretly Canadian, 2017) – produced by Tom Lunt
- 512 (Secretly Canadian, 2023) – produced by Tom Lunt

== Art market ==
In 2012, 39 of Eggleston's larger-format prints – 40 by 66 inches (100 by 170 cm) instead of the original format of 16 by 20 inches (41 by 51 cm) – sold for $5.9 million in an auction at Christie's to benefit the Eggleston Artistic Trust, an organization dedicated to the preservation of the artist's work. The top lot, Untitled 1970, set a world auction record for a single print by the photographer at $578,000. New York art collector Jonathan Sobel subsequently filed a lawsuit in United States District Court for the Southern District of New York against Eggleston, alleging that the artist's decision to print and sell oversized versions of some of his famous images in an auction has diluted the rarity—and therefore the resale value—of the originals. The court dismissed the lawsuit.

== Commercial use of images ==
Eggleston's photographs have been used as the cover of several musical albums including:

Year	Image	Artist	Album
1974	The Red Ceiling (1973)	Big Star	Radio City
1979	(Dolls on a Cadillac hood)	Alex Chilton	Like Flies on Sherbert
1994	(Neon Confederate flag and a palm tree)	Primal Scream	Give Out But Don't Give Up
1994		Terry Manning	Christopher Idylls (CD release)
2001	Memphis (1968)	Jimmy Eat World	Bleed American
2004		Chuck Prophet	Age of Miracles
2005		Silver Jews	Tanglewood Numbers
2006		Primal Scream	"Country Girl" (Single)
2007		Joanna Newsom	Joanna Newsom and the Ys Street Band
2010		Spoon	Transference
2021		The Black Keys	Delta Kream
2026		The Black Keys	Peaches!
2026		Kurt Vile	Philadelphia's Been Good to Me

One of Eggleston's photographs is also the cover for the paperback edition of Ali Smith's novel The Accidental.

== Film appearances ==
=== Documentary appearances ===
- William Eggleston in the Real World (2005), by Michael Almereyda.
- By the Ways: A Journey with William Eggleston (2007), directed by Vincent Gérard and Cédric Laty – selected for the Grand Jury Prize at Sundance Film Festival in 2006.
- The Colourful Mr. Eggleston (2009), directed by Jack Cocker and Reiner Holzemer – an episode of the Imagine (TV series) for BBC One.
- The Source (2012), by Doug Aitken.
- Big Star: Nothing Can Hurt Me (2013), directed by Drew DeNicola and Olivia Mori.

=== Movie and series appearances ===
- Great Balls of Fire (1989), directed by Jim McBride – Eggleston plays Jerry Lee Lewis's father, Elmo Lewis.
- Restless, x-ray technician (2011), as himself.
- Today (TV Series) (episode dated 31 May 2011), as himself.
- Sunday Morning (A Father and Daughter's Artistic Collaboration, 2016)

== Exhibitions ==
Selected exhibition history
Year	Title	Institution	Location	Ref
1976		MoMA	New York	
1999–2000	William Eggleston and the Color Tradition,	J. Paul Getty Museum	Los Angeles	
2001–2002	William Eggleston	Fondation Cartier	Paris	
2001–2002	William Eggleston	Hayward Gallery	London	
2002		documenta 11	Kassel, Germany	
2002–2005	William Eggleston: Los Alamos	Museum Ludwig	Cologne, Germany	
2002–2005	William Eggleston: Los Alamos	Serralves Foundation	Portugal	
2002–2005	William Eggleston: Los Alamos	Norwegian Museum of Contemporary Art	Oslo, Norway	
2002–2005	William Eggleston: Los Alamos	Louisiana Museum of Modern Art	Humlebaek, Denmark	
2002–2005	William Eggleston: Los Alamos	Albertina	Vienna, Austria	
2002–2005	William Eggleston: Los Alamos	San Francisco Museum of Modern Art	San Francisco, California	
2002–2005	William Eggleston: Los Alamos	Dallas Museum of Art	Dallas, Texas	
2008	William Eggleston: Democratic Camera, Photographs and Video 1961–2008	Whitney Museum of American Art	New York	
2012	New Dyes	Rose Gallery	Santa Monica, California	
2016	William Eggleston: Selections from the Wilson Centre for Photography	Portland Art Museum	Portland	
2016	William Eggleston Portraits	National Portrait Gallery	London	
2017	William Eggleston: Los Alamos	Foam Fotografiemuseum Amsterdam	Amsterdam	
2018	William Eggleston: Los Alamos	Metropolitan Museum of Art		
2023	William Eggleston: Mystery of the Ordinary	C/O Berlin	Berlin, Germany	
2024/2025	William Eggleston The Last Dyes	David Zwirner Gallery	Los Angeles	

== Awards ==
- 1974: Guggenheim Fellowship
- 1975: Photographer's Fellowship, National Endowment for the Arts
- 1978: Survey Grant, National Endowment for the Arts, for a survey of Mississippi cotton farms using photography and color video
- 1989: "54 Master Photographers of 1960-1979" Award, Photographic Society of Japan
- 1995: Distinguished Achievement Award, University of Memphis
- 1998: Hasselblad Award, Hasselblad Foundation, Gothenburg, Sweden
- 2003: Special 150th Anniversary Medal and Honorary Fellowship (HonFRPS), Royal Photographic Society, London
- 2004: Getty Images Lifetime Achievement Award at the International Center of Photography (ICP)
- 2013: Outstanding Contribution to Photography Award, Sony World Photography Awards, World Photography Organisation, London.

== Collections ==
Eggleston's work is held in the following public collections:

- Art Institute of Chicago, Chicago, IL
- J. Paul Getty Museum, Los Angeles, CA
- Museum of Modern Art, New York City
- Pier 24 Photography, San Francisco
- San Francisco Museum of Modern Art, San Francisco, CA
- Whitney Museum of American Art, New York City
- International Photography Hall of Fame, St.Louis, MO

== Publications ==
- William Eggleston's Guide. New York: Museum of Modern Art, 1976. ISBN 978-0-87070-317-1.
- Wedgwood Blue (1979)
- Seven (1979)
- Election Eve. New York City: Caldecot Chubb, 1977. Artist book. Two volumes. Edition of five copies. (a portfolio of photographs taken around Plains, Georgia, the rural seat of Jimmy Carter before the 1976 presidential election)
  - Göttingen: Steidl; 2017. ISBN 978-3-95829-266-6. One volume.
- Morals of Vision. New York City: Caldecot Chubb, 1978. Artist book. Edition of fifteen copies.
  - Göttingen: Steidl; 2018. ISBN 978-3-95829-390-8.
- Flowers. New York City: Caldecot Chubb, 1978. Artist book. Edition of fifteen copies.
  - Göttingen: Steidl; 2019. ISBN 978-3-95829-389-2.
- Troubled Waters (1980)
- The Louisiana Project (1980)
- The Democratic Forest.
  - London: Secker & Warburg, 1989. With an introduction by Eudora Welty and an afterword by Eggleston and Mark Holborn.
  - New York: Doubleday, 1989. ISBN 978-0-385266-51-2. With an introduction by Welty and an afterword by Eggleston and Mark Holborn.
  - Expanded edition. Göttingen: Steidl, 2015. ISBN 978-3-86930-792-3. Ten volume set, 1328 pages, 1010 photographs.
  - The Democratic Forest: Selected Works. New York: David Zwirner; Göttingen: Steidl, 2016. ISBN 978-3-95829-256-7. 68 photographs.
- William Eggleston's Graceland (1984) (a series of commissioned photographs of Elvis Presley's Graceland, depicting the singer's home as an airless, windowless tomb in custom-made bad taste)
- Faulkner's Mississippi. Birmingham: Oxmoor House, 1990. ISBN 978-0-848710-52-1. With a text by Willie Morris.
- Ancient and Modern. New York: Random House, 1992. ISBN 978-0-224069-63-2. With an introduction by Mark Holborn.
- Horses and Dogs. Washington and London: Smithsonian Institution, 1994. ISBN 978-1560985051. Essay by Richard B. Woodward.
- The Hasselblad Award 1998: William Eggleston. Zurich: Scalo; Goteborg: Hasselblad Center, 1999. ISBN 978-3908247982. Edited by Gunilla Knape. With essays by Walter Hopps and Thomas Weski, and a transcript of an interview with Ute Eskildsen.
- 2 1/4. Santa Fe: Twin Palms Publishers, 1999, 2008, 2011. ISBN 978-0-944092-70-5. With a text by Bruce Wagner.
- William Eggleston. Göttingen: Steidl; Paris: Foundation Cartier, 2001. ISBN 978-2-86925-084-0. Bilingual (French and English).
- Los Alamos. (Note: Completed in 1974, but published much later) Zurich: Scalo Publishers, 2003. ISBN 978-3-908247-69-2. With a text by Walter Hopps and Thomas Weski.
- The Spirit of Dunkerque.
  - Paris: Biro, 2006. ISBN 2351190173.
  - Corte Madera, CA: Gingko, 2009. With a text by Vincent Gerard and Jean-pierre Rehm.
- 5 × 7. Santa Fe: Twin Palms Publishers, 2007. ISBN 9781931885485. With an essay by Michael Almereyda.
- William Eggleston: Democratic Camera, Photographs and Video, 1961–2008. With a text by Elisabeth Sussman, Thomas Weski, Tina Kukielski, and Stanley Booth. Exhibition catalog.
  - New York: Whitney Museum of American Art, 2008.
  - New Haven, CT: Yale University, 2008. ISBN 978-0300126211.
- Paris. Göttingen: Steidl, 2009. ISBN 978-3-865219-15-2.
- Before Color. Göttingen: Steidl, 2010. ISBN 978-3-869301-22-8.
- For Now. Santa Fe: Twin Palms Publishing, 2010. ISBN 978-1-931885-93-5. Afterword by Michael Almereyda; short texts, "Eggleston, 1971" by Lloyd Fonvielle, "In Conversation with William Eggleston" by Kristina McKenna, "Two Women and One Man" by Greil Marcus, "Night Vision: The Cinema of William Eggleston" by Any Taubin, and a longer text "It Never Entered My Mind": (Answers to 11 frequently asked questions about William Eggleston in the Real World)" by Michael Almereyda.
- Chromes. Göttingen: Steidl, 2011. ISBN 978-3-869303-11-6.
- Los Alamos Revisited. Göttingen: Steidl, 2012. ISBN 978-3-869305-32-5.
- From Black & White to Color. Göttingen: Steidl, 2014. ISBN 978-3869307930. With an introduction by Agnès Sire ("The Invention of a Language"), essay by Thomas Weski.
- At Zenith. Göttingen: Steidl, 2014. ISBN 978-3869307107.
- Polaroid SX-70. Göttingen: Steidl, 2019. ISBN 978-3958295032.
- The Outlands. Steidl, 2021. ISBN 978-3-95829-265-9
- The Outlands, Selected Works. David Zwirner Books, 2022. ISBN 1644230771
- Mystery of the Ordinary. Steidl, 2023. ISBN 978-3-96999-220-3

== General references ==
- Eggleston, William (1989). The Democratic Forest. Introduction by Eudora Welty. New York: Doubleday. ISBN 0-385-26651-0.
- Eggleston, William & Morris, William (1990). Faulkner's Mississippi. Birmingham: Oxmoor House. ISBN 0-8487-1052-5.
- Eggleston, William (1992). Ancient and Modern. Introduction by Mark Holborn. New York: Random House. ISBN 0-679-41464-9.
- Lindgren, Carl Edwin. (1993 Summer). "Ancient and modern". Review of Ancient and Modern by William Eggleston. Number, Volume 19:20–21.
- Lindgren, Carl Edwin. (1993). "Enigmatic presence". Review of Ancient and Modern by William Eggleston. RSA Journal (Journal of the Roy. Soc. of Arts), Volume 141 Number 5439, 404.
- Woodward, Richard B. (October 1991). "Memphis Beau". Vanity Fair.
- Eggleston Trust bio
