= Bright Penny =

Studio album by Liam Hayes and Plush
- Released: September 28, 2009
- Recorded: 2005–2007
- Genre: Rock
- Length: 37:00
- Label: Broken Horse
- Producers: Tom Lunt, Liam Hayes

Liam Hayes and Plush chronology
Fed (album) (2002)	Bright Penny (2009)	A Glimpse Inside the Mind of Charles Swan III (Music From the Motion Picture) (2013)

Bright Penny is the third studio album by American artist Liam Hayes, originally released on September 28, 2009.

== Background and recording ==
In 2004, Hayes started to work on roughing out new songs at studios in Los Angeles and in various studios around Chicago. "I've been working on it off and on, just doing different demos. Some stuff I did in LA a couple of years ago, and I'm just kind of bringing it all together. It's been in pieces until now and now I have some final tracks."

Formal sessions for Bright Penny began in December 2004 at the New York home studio of Salon music critic Thomas Bartlett, who's also the keyboardist in the art-pop band Doveman. Hayes financed and produced Bright Penny himself along with Tom Lunt, co-owner of Chicago label the Numero Group, who served as its executive producer. A large cast of musicians contributed to the recording of the album including legendary jazz and soul session drummer Morris Jennings (who also appeared on Fed) and Bob Lizik and Jim Hines, the rhythm section from Brian Wilson's current backing group. Bernard Reed (Jackie Wilson's bass player also appeared alongside Pat Sansone and John Stirratt of The Autumn Defense and Wilco.

In early 2005 Hayes told the press that "We might be as much as 40 percent done, depending on how well some of the recent stuff has turned out. From the start we wanted this to be a 2006 release. That's what I'm still hoping for. I am very focused right now on completing this new batch of songs." The sessions continued until the summer of 2007 with engineers Bill Skibbe and Jessica Ruffins mixing the bulk of the record at Key Club Recording Co. in Benton Harbor, Michigan.

John Dugan who worked on preliminary for the album says, "Back around 2002, I worked on some demos with Liam, playing drums and even bass to sketch out Liam’s fresh set of songs. Liam is a complex studio artist who will often overdub a drum kit on a song that he's been working on for half-a-dozen years, then put strings on it six months later. I knew that these songs would end up layered, reorganized and a bit more baroque than Fed by the time they were done."

The album features complex arrangements and lush instrumentation and orchestration. String sections, horn sections, brass, woodwinds, sitars, tamboura, harpsichord and stylophones are all used in the album, with elements of intricate pop and rock songwriting being used throughout the album.

Bright Penny was released in 2009 on Broken Horse Records.

== Track listing ==
1. "Take a Chance"
2. "If I Could"
3. "White Telescope"
4. "I Sing Silence"
5. "Look Up, Look Down"
6. "We Made It"
7. "So Much Music"
8. "Getaway"
9. "The Goose Is Out"
10. "O Street"
