= The Red Ceiling =

1973 photograph by William Eggleston

- Artist: William Eggleston
- Year: 1973
- Type: Photograph
- Medium: Dye transfer print
- Dimensions: 35.2 cm × 55.1 cm (13.9 in × 21.7 in)
- Location: Getty Center; Museum of Modern Art

The Red Ceiling is a color photograph by American photographer William Eggleston, from 1973. Its formal title is Greenwood, Mississippi. Eggleston took the photo at the home of his friend Dr. Thomas Chester Boring, Jr., at 508 Macarthur St., in Greenwood, Mississippi.

== Process ==
The photograph is a dye transfer print measuring 13 7/8 by 21 11/16 inches (35.2 by 55.1 cm). Eggleston considers it among his most challenging and powerful works, "so powerful that, in fact, I've never seen it reproduced on the page to my satisfaction".

== Reception ==
It has been described as Eggleston's "most famous photograph," with "some indefinable sense of menace". It is widely recognised as the album cover for the record Radio City (1974) by the Memphis band Big Star.

== Public collections ==
A copy of the photograph is held by the J. Paul Getty Museum, in Los Angeles, but is not on view at the Getty Center. Another copy is held by the Museum of Modern Art, in New York.

== Bibliography ==
Jane Flowers The True Legacy of Dr Tom Boring, An Unsolved Murder Mystery Biography, published June 18, 2020
