= Korp Sole Roller =

Studio album by Liam Hayes
- Released: 2014
- Recorded: 2012–2013
- Genre: Rock
- Length: 37:40
- Producer: Pat Sansone Liam Hayes

Liam Hayes chronology
A Glimpse Inside the Mind of Charles Swan III (Music From the Motion Picture) (2013)	Korp Sole Roller (2014)	Slurrup (2015)

Korp Sole Roller is the fourth studio album by American artist Liam Hayes, released in 2014 on Broken Horse Records and recorded over a one-year period with producer Pat Sansone in Chicago.

Sweet, occasionally slightly Glam Rock songs careen around ornate string and wind instrument arrangements by Pat Sansone, possessing that slightly sun-warped take on the classic pop music of the 1970s.

== Track listing ==
1. "A Glimpse Inside"
2. "Dream Deferred"
3. "Cred A Thousand Times"
4. "Waves"
5. "I'm Sorry"
6. "The Sane Society"
7. "Rosita"
8. "The Wake"
9. "Sweet Voice"
10. "Rock And Roll"

== Personnel ==
- Liam Hayes - Voice, Piano, Acoustic Guitar, Electric Guitar, Chamberlin M1, Mellotron, Wurlitzer Piano, Rhodes Piano, String Arrangement.
- Pat Sansone - Voice, Bass guitar, Piano, Electric Guitar, Acoustic Guitar, Harpsichord, Chamberlin M1, Mellotron, Wurlitzer Piano, Rhodes Piano, Hammond Organ, Celeste, String Arrangement.
- Greg Wieczorek - Drums
- Recorded by Pat Sansone and Joshua Shapera at the Wilco Loft, Black Sheep.
- Mixed by Pat Sansone and Joshua Shapera.
- Additional engineering Chris Gellin, Nathan Cook (producer).
- Mastered by Jim DeMain at Yes Master.
