= Sad Sour Future =

Studio album by the Poison Control Center
- Released: May 18, 2010
- Genre: Rock
- Length: 1:11:24
- Label: Afternoon Records
- Producer: Pat Stolley

The Poison Control Center chronology
A Collage Of Impressions (2007)	Sad Sour Future (2010)	Stranger Ballet (2011)

Sad Sour Future is the fifth studio album by American musical group the Poison Control Center, released on May 18, 2010.

Professional ratings
Review scores
Source	Rating
Pitchfork	(7.4/10)
Slant Magazine	3.5/5 stars
