= One for the Team =

- Origin: Minneapolis, Minnesota, United States
- Genres: Indie rock, indie pop
- Years active: 2006–Present
- Label: Afternoon Records
- Members: Ian Anderson; Grace Fiddler; Elliot Manthey; Jacob Huelster
- Past members: Bill Caperton; John Krueger; Bryan Sonday; Sam Gerard; Brett Bullion
- Website: Official website

One for the Team is an indie rock group from Minneapolis, Minnesota. In 2006, the band was formed by American songwriter Ian Anderson, who is also the founder of Afternoon Records. One for the Team served as an outlet for Anderson's musical talent and songwriting that did not fit his older band Aneuretical. The band has released three full-length albums, Good Boys Don't Make Noise in 2006 on Afternoon Records, Build It Up in 2008 on The Militia Group and Afternoon Records, Ghosts in 2010 on Afternoon Records and one EP, Build A Garden in 2009. The band is completed by co-lead-vocalist and keyboard player Grace Fiddler, and drummer Elliot Manthey, and bass player Jacob Huelster.

== History ==
Originally intended as an outlet for Anderson's pop-songs that didn't quite the aesthetic of his first band, Aneuretical, One for the Team started as a strictly-studio side project with Manthey and original bass player John Krueger. In 2006, One for the Team released Good Boys Don’t Make Noise on Anderson's own Afternoon Records and received a mass of critical acclaim, which moved the project from the studio and onto the stage.

Although receiving attention almost exclusively via blogs and building large fan bases in New York, Los Angeles, England, Germany and Japan, One for the Team stuck to the Midwest while Anderson finished his undergraduate degree in English at Saint Olaf College in Northfield, Minnesota.

After several tours, multiple member changes, which included Bill Caperton of Ela, Sam Gerard(Voytek, Squareshooters, Musket, The Talkers, Teen Eagle) One for the Team settled on its current lineup, which features Fiddler, Manthey and bass player Jacob Huelster, formerly of Look Down.

The addition of Fiddler was integral to what is now considered the band's sound: dual vocals. Anderson and Fiddler share vocal duties almost equally as the pair sing in unison throughout their most recent albums and during live shows. Grace Fiddler left the band The Battle Royale, to further her dreams after being in the band for four years.

=== Build It Up ===
One for the Team's second album, Build It Up, was recorded in Minneapolis, Minnesota in April 2008 at Fur Seal Studios with Rob Skoro and Joe Johnson. Released jointly by Militia Group and Afternoon Records on August 19, 2008, the album received critical acclaim and was featured by SPIN, NPR, MTV and the band recorded a Daytrotter Session in Rock Island, Ill. in December 2008. The band toured extensively after the release, visiting 38 states over180 tour dates and spent time on the road with Dressy Bessy, Frightened Rabbit, the French Kicks, So Many Dynamos, Someone Still Loves You Boris Yeltsin and Select Start.

=== Build A Garden ===
One for the Team's third studio album, Build A Garden, is an eight-song EP that was recorded by One for the Team in their apartment in Minneapolis and released by Afternoon Records. It was engineered, mixed and produced by Anderson entirely in his bedroom. Released on April 14, 2009, the EP comprises four songs from Build It Up re-arranged and re-recorded and four new songs. There was a limited pressing of 500 hand-made copies and it is available for digital download.

== Recognition ==
One for the Team's second album, Build It Up, received critical acclaim and was featured by SPIN, NPR, MTV and the band recorded a Daytrotter Session in Rock Island, Ill. in December 2008. The band toured extensively after the release, visiting 38 states with over 180 tour dates.

== Members ==
- Ian Anderson – vocals, guitar
- Grace Fiddler – vocals, keyboard
- Jacob Huelster – bass
- Elliot Manthey – drums

== Discography ==
- Good Boys Don't Make Noise (Afternoon Records, 2006)
- Build It Up (Afternoon Records/The Militia Group, 2008)
- Build a Garden (Afternoon Records, 2009)
- Ghosts (Afternoon Records, 2010)
