= We All Have Hooks for Hands =

American folk pop group

We All Have Hooks For Hands
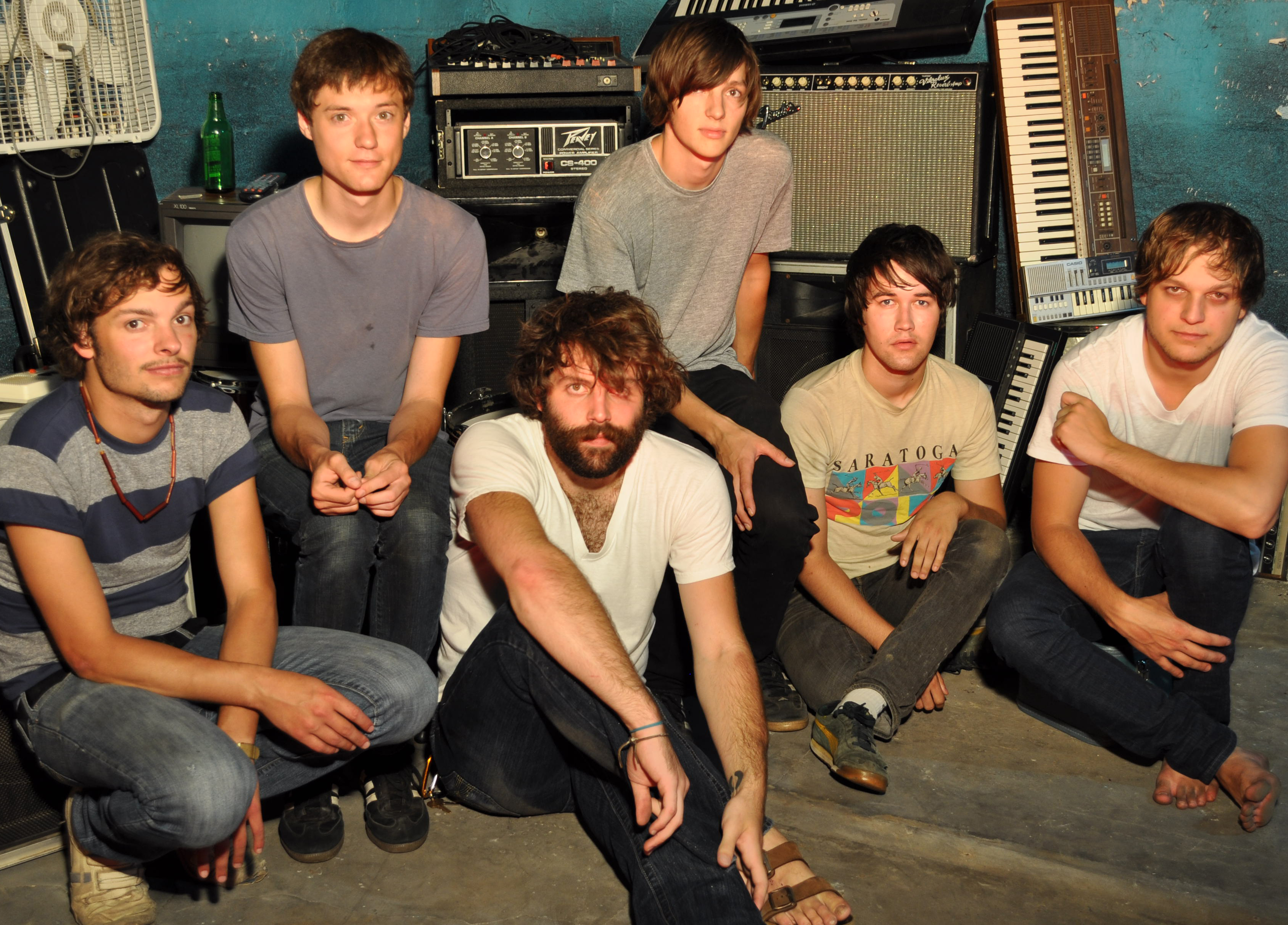

Background information
- Origin: Sioux Falls, South Dakota, United States
- Genres: Indie rock, Indie pop, Folk
- Years active: 2005–Present
- Labels: Afternoon Records
- Website: Official website

We All Have Hooks for Hands is an American folk pop group from Sioux Falls, South Dakota. In early 2007 the group signed to Afternoon Records. The group formed after the breakup of their former punk/ hardcore bands. Starting as a studio recording collective the band solidified at nine members with the release of "The Pretender" their first full-length album. Soon after that they set off on tour with Mouthful of Bees for a couple weeks to the east coast and a few dates in the south. In 2009 the group was pushed into the studio in Minneapolis to record their next full length "The Shape of Energy". "The Shape of Energy" was engineered by Dusty Miller at The Terrarium and his home studio, then mixed by Ian Pulicci, and finally mastered by Dave Gardner. They took a different approach on this album recording most of it live in studio, and then single tracking the rest. The album was released on November 15, 2009.

The group has put a hard push towards their album "The Shape of Energy", by touring in late 2009 to early 2010.

- Logan Borchardt (guitar)
- Tory Stollen (drums)
- Eli Show (guitar, vocals)
- Tony Helland (bass guitar)
- Isaac Show (drums, Head Writer, Great Dude)
- Dave Lethcoe (keyboard, trumpet)
- Tim Evenson (guitar, vocals)

Revolving Contributors

- Paul Squier (Tambourine, Washboard)
- Natalie Hoffman (Tambourine, Trumpet)
- Rich Show (Vocals)
- Brent Hardie (trumpet, keyboard)
- Micheal Graber (violin)
- Soulcrate Music

== In Media ==
Their song Jumpin' Jean-Luc is used as the theme song for the online web series Vermillion.

The Man Trying to Outfox Us All was song of the day on November 19, 2007, for KEXP.

Made Up Of Tiny Lights was song of the day on November 12, 2009, for KEXP

The band was featured in the independent comedy/mystery film by War Wolf Pictures, Death Sucks, about a killer who uses a vacuum cleaner as a weapon.

== Discography ==
- The Pretender (Afternoon Records, 2007)
- We All Have Hooks For Hands Versus Soulcrate Music (Self Released, 2007)
- The Shape of Energy (Afternoon Records, 2009)
- Girls (Afternoon Records, 2011)
