= Kitten (Kitten album) =

Album by Kitten

Studio album by Kitten
- Released: June 24, 2014
- Genres: Alternative rock; synth-pop; new wave
- Length: 52:56
- Label: Elektra
- Producers: Chad Anderson; Nic Johns; Gavin MacKillop

Kitten chronology
Like a Stranger (2013)	Kitten (2014)	Heaven or Somewhere in Between (2016)

Kitten is the debut album by American indie rock band Kitten, released on June 24, 2014 through Elektra Records. It received mixed to positive reviews from critics.

The album was influenced by 1980s acts such as the Motels, Eurythmics, Tears for Fears, and OMD.

== Track listing ==
All tracks are written by Chloe Chaidez and Chad Anderson, except where noted.

No.	Title	Length
1.	"Like a Stranger"	5:09
2.	"Sensible"	3:03
3.	"Sex Drive"	3:07
4.	"I'll Be Your Girl"	4:46
5.	"Cathedral"	5:24
6.	"G#"	4:43
7.	"Why I Wait" (Chloe Chaidez, Julian Chaidez, Chad Anderson)	5:07
8.	"Devotion"	4:40
9.	"Doubt"	4:49
10.	"Cut It Out" (C. Chaidez, J. Chaidez, Anderson)	3:28
11.	"Kill the Light"	5:22
12.	"Apples and Cigarettes"	3:18

iTunes Store bonus track
No.	Title	Length
13.	"Lia"	5:10

== Critical reception ==
Professional ratings
Aggregate scores
Source	Rating
Metacritic	59/100
Review scores
Source	Rating
AllMusic	3.5/5 stars
PopMatters	5/10 stars
Rolling Stone	2.5/5 stars

Kitten received mixed to positive reviews, with review aggregator Metacritic assigning the album a normalized score of 59 based on 4 reviews. The album was ranked number 16 on Rolling Stone's list of the 20 Best Pop Albums of 2014.

== Charts ==
Chart (2014)	Peak position
US Heatseekers Albums (Billboard)	9
