= Heaven (Pomegranates album) =

Studio album by Pomegranates
- Released: June 5, 2012
- Genre: Alternative rock, indie rock
- Length: 35:57
- Label: Modern Outsider
- Producer: Miguel Urbitztondo, Pomegranates

Pomegranates chronology
One of Us (2010)	Heaven (2012)

Heaven is the fourth studio album by the Cincinnati indie rock group Pomegranates, released June 5, 2012, on Modern Outsider Records. It was produced by Miguel Urbitztondo who has worked with acts such as Cracker, Daniel Johnston, and Sparklehorse. The album follows their critically acclaimed One of Us in 2010.

== Reception ==
Paste assigned the album a rating of 6.1 out of ten.

== Track listing ==
All songs written by Pomegranates

No.	Title	Length
1.	"Heaven"	2:34
2.	"Passaway"	3:37
3.	"Sisters"	2:55
4.	"Ezekiel"	3:13
5.	"Something Everybody Wants"	3:15
6.	"Letters"	4:35
7.	"Dream"	3:50
8.	"Night Run"	3:56
9.	"Lost Lives"	4:14
10.	"Surfing the Human Heart"	3:48

== Personnel ==
Pomegranates

- Joey Cook – Bass, Guitar, Keyboards, Percussion, Vocals
- Isaac Karns – Bass, Guitar, Keyboards, Sampling, Vocals
- Jacob Merritt – Drums & Percussion
- Curt Kiser – Bass, Guitar, Vocals
