= Cut It Out (EP) =

EP by Kitten
- Released: May 2, 2011
- Genre: Indie pop, alternative rock
- Length: 25:51
- Label: Atlantic Records
- Producer: Chad Anderson; Gavin Mackillop

Kitten chronology
| Sunday School (2010) | Cut It Out (2011) | Like a Stranger (2013) |

Vinyl cover

Singles from Cut It Out
- 1. "Cut It Out" Released: June 12, 2012; 2. "G#" Released: September 5, 2012; 3. "Japanese Eyes" Released: October 15, 2012

Cut It Out is the second extended play (EP) by American indie rock band Kitten. It was released on May 2, 2011.

== Background ==
Produced by Chad Anderson and Gavin Mackillop, the EP includes six songs with a running time of 25:50. Three singles, “Cut It Out”, “G#” and “Japanese Eyes”, were followed by their own respective music videos, which can be found on the band’s YouTube page. The song “Christina” was originally written about Christina Ricci, but the band later confirmed that they had changed a few lyrics because it "felt too specific."

Kitten's frontwoman, Chloe Chaidez, describes the sound of their sophomore EP as more "electronic" and "rock" than the previous, citing a strong '80s influence. Yahoo described the EP as a "frenzied but melodic blend of danceable pop with an undercurrent of raw post-punk and 80s new wave; ...filled with irresistible melodies, incessant hooks, and Chaidez's provocative lyricism."

== Track listing ==
All tracks are written by Chloe Chaidez and Chad Anderson, except where noted.

| No. | Title | Length |
|---|---|---|
| 1. | "Cut It Out" (Chloe Chaidez, Julian Chaidez, Chad Anderson) | 3:29 |
| 2. | "Japanese Eyes" | 3:14 |
| 3. | "G#" | 4:46 |
| 4. | "Sugar" | 3:47 |
| 5. | "Junk" | 4:25 |
| 6. | "Christina" | 6:11 |
| Total length: | | 25:50 |

Vinyl edition
| No. | Title | Length |
|---|---|---|
| 1. | "Cut It Out" | 3:29 |
| 2. | "G#" | 4:46 |
| 3. | "Cut It Out" (Kastle Remix) | 3:08 |
| 4. | "Sugar" | 3:47 |
| 5. | "Japanese Eyes" | 3:14 |
| 6. | "Sugar" (Bandayde Remix) | 5:14 |
| Total length: | | 23:38 |

== Release history ==
| Date | Format | Label |
|---|---|---|
| May 2, 2011 | Digital download • CD | Atlantic Records |
