= List of Archie Comics' Sonic the Hedgehog publications =

This is a list of Sonic the Hedgehog titles published by Archie Comics including miniseries, spinoffs and comics crossing over.

== Comics ==
The Sonic the Hedgehog comic continuity currently comprises the following comics:

- **Sonic the Hedgehog** #1–290 (Published from April 1993 to December 2016) (Published thirteen times a year [every four weeks] until 2007 then published monthly [every month's first Wednesday] thereafter)
- **Sonic Universe** #1–94 (Published every month from February 2009 to March 2017)
- **Sonic the Hedgehog Miniseries** #0–3 (Published monthly from November 1992 to February 1993)
- **Sonic Specials** (Eight individual issues, published quarterly from 1994 to 1997)
  - Sonic: In Your Face! (Fall 1994)
  - Sonic & Knuckles (Spring 1995)
  - Sonic Triple Trouble (Summer 1995)
  - Knuckles' Chaotix (Fall 1995)
  - Super Sonic vs. Hyper Knuckles (Winter 1995)
  - Mecha Madness (Summer 1996)
  - Sonic Live! (Fall 1996)
  - Sonic Blast (Winter 1996)
- **Princess Sally Miniseries** #1–3 (Published monthly from April to June 1995)
- **Tails Miniseries** #1–3 (Published monthly from December 1995 to February 1996)
- **Knuckles Miniseries** #1–3 (Published monthly from July to September 1996)
- **Sonic Quest: The Death Egg Saga Miniseries** #1–3 (Published monthly from December 1996 to February 1997, reprinted February 2007)
- **Knuckles the Echidna** #1–32 (Published monthly from April 1997 to February 2000)
- **Sonic Super Specials** #1–15 (Published quarterly from 1997 to 2001)
  - Battle Royal (#1 of Summer 1997)
  - Brave New World (#2 of Fall 1997)
  - Sonic Firsts (#3 of Winter 1998)
  - Return of the King (#4 of Spring 1998)
  - Sonic Kids (#5 of Summer 1998)
  - Sonic #50: Director's Cut (#6 of Fall 1998)
  - Parallel Paradigm (#7 of Winter 1999)
  - Zone Wars Prelude (#8 of Spring 1999)
  - Sonic Kids 2 (#9 of Summer 1999)
  - Crossover Chaos (#10 of Fall 1999)
  - Girls Rule! (#11 of Winter 2000)
  - Turnabout Heroes (#12 of Spring 2000)
  - Sonic Adventure (#13 of Summer 2000)
  - Sonic Stew (#14 of Fall 2000)
  - Naugus Games (#15 of Winter 2001)
- **Sonic X** #1–40 (Published ten times a year from September 2005, to January 2009) (Based on Sonic X anime series, and continued with Sonic Universe)
- **Sonic Boom** #1-11 (Published monthly from October 2014, to September 2015) (Based on the cartoon Sonic Boom, and crossed over with the main continuity and the Mega Man comics during "Worlds Unite")
- **Free Comic Book Day 2007 comic** (A one-shot comic made for free distribution on Free Comic Book Day 2007.)
- **Free Comic Book Day 2008 comic** (A special reprint of Issue #1 of the main comic series, with a new cover—based on the original—by Patrick "Spaz" Spaziante, made for free distribution on Free Comic Book Day 2008)
- **Free Comic Book Day 2009 comic** (An illustrated summary of the story through #199, released for Free Comic Book Day 2009)
- **Free Comic Book Day 2010 comic** (A one-shot comic made for free distribution on Free Comic Book Day 2010)
- **Free Comic Book Day 2011 comic** (A remake of Sonic Super Special 15 for Free Comic Book Day 2011)
- **Free Comic Book Day 2012 comic** (A reprint of issue #230 of the main series, with a special cover for Free Comic Book Day 2012)
- **Free Comic Book Day 2013 comic** (A flip book special. One half with a reprint of issue #247 of the main series and the other half with a reprint of #23 of the Mega Man comic series)
- **Free Comic Book Day 2014 comic** (A flip book special. One half with a reprint of the first two Sonic Comic Origins stories "Sally—The Exiled Leader" & "Rotor—The Exiled Inventor". The other half reprints the two part back up stories from Mega Man #34–35 titled "X-Factor".
- **Free Comic Book Day 2015 comic** (A flip book special setting up Sonic the Hedgehog/Mega Man: Worlds Unite. The first half contains the story "Into the Unknown" which introduces the Genesis Portals, while the second half reprints various issues of Mega Man featuring the Archie Exclusive villain, Xander Payne. "Into the Unknown" was later reprinted in the second half of Sonic the Hedgehog #275.)
- **Free Comic Book Day 2016 comic** (This book contains reprints of "Keys to Victory" from Sonic the Hedgehog #280 and the first 10 pages of "Eggman’s Dozen: Part 1" from Sonic Universe #83. It also contains a sneak peek for the "Panic in the Sky" story arc in Sonic the Hedgehog #284-#287. This is also the final Free Comic Book Day Special for the Archie Sonic the Hedgehog series before its cancellation.)
- **Archie Sonic Halloween Comic Fest 2013** (October 31, 2013) (This book contains a prequel story to the 2013 Sonic game Sonic Lost World. This is also the first issue of the Free Halloween Comic Fest that Archie Comics has participated with.)
- **Sonic: Mega Drive** (July 2016)
- **Sonic: Mega Drive-The Next Level** (November 2016)
- **Sonic: Mega Drive-Overdrive** (cancelled)
- Sonic also has appeared in issue #28 of **Sabrina the Teenage Witch** as well in a two-part crossover which concluded in **Sonic Super Special #10: Crossover Chaos**. In this crossover, Sonic was brought to Sabrina's world and brainwashed into fighting the former.
- In 1998, a mini-comic given away for Halloween entitled Archie & Friends: A Halloween Tale was released and featured a short story called **A Festival of Fantasy** that included appearances by Sonic, Knuckles and Dr. Robotnik.
- Sonic has also made a cameo in a 1999 Archie's Weird Mysteries mini-comic.
- **Mega Man** #23 (From May 2013)
  - The second half of the issue was included with the FCBD Special of 2013. The story served as a lead in for the World Collide, with Dr. Wily referring to plans with his new friend **Ivo**, paralleling with Dr. Eggman referring to Dr. Wily in StH #247 as **Albert**. As with the StH #247's ending, MM #23 ends with the Genesis Wave being launched.
- **Mega Man** #24–27 (From April–July 2013)
  - The aforementioned issues contained chapters of the Worlds Collide crossover, which were respectively Part 1, 4, 7 & 10.
- **Mega Man** #28 (From August 2013)
  - The issue serves as an aftermath for Mega Man and cast, who don't remember the events of the crossover. The story opens with Mega Man's final dialogue from StH #251, as well as Dr. Wily having an unexplained violent urge to stomp on a carton of eggs (due to Eggman betraying him). Both this issue and StH #252 open with the title characters briefly recalling past events as their worlds are restored.
- **Mega Man** #38 (June 2014)
  - Emerald Spears member Xander Payne is traveling through several time periods and witnesses both Mega Man & Sonic fighting the Roboticized Tails (during the events of Mega Man #25). Due to copyright reasons, Tails is shown in a silhouette, while Sonic is shown only as a speeding blue ball.
- **Mega Man** #40 (August 2014)
  - Xander Payne, after his arrest, is sketching images of all he saw on his trip through time onto his cell wall. One of the pictures shown is Sonic's face.
- **Mega Man** #42 (October 2014)
  - Though the story has no relevance to Sonic, the alternate cover is the second part of a series of the Super Smash Variant covers to promote Super Smash Bros for the Nintendo 3DS and Wii U. The first part is the alternate cover for Sonic Universe #69, with the final part being the alternate cover for Sonic the Hedgehog #266.
- **Mega Man** #43 (November 2014)
  - Xander Payne (recently moved to a new cell) continues sketching pictures into his cell wall, including another sketch of Sonic's face. He mentions that Dr. Wily and everyone's reckoning will come and that worlds will collide again (The words World and Collide are emphasized in bold).
- **Mega Man** #49 (May 2015)
  - Prelude to the Worlds Unite crossover. The issue ends with Sigma abducting Dr. Wily through a Genesis Portal.
- **Mega Man** #50–52 (June–August 2015)
  - The aforementioned issues contain chapters of the Worlds Unite crossover, which are respectively Part 4, 8 & 12.
- **Mega Man: Worlds Unite Battles** #1 (June 2015)
  - Expands upon the following fight scenes from Worlds Unite:
    - Mega Man VS Zomom, Master Zik and Zazz of the Deadly Six.
    - Zero, Axl and Silver the Hedgehog VS Vile.
    - Sonic Man (Roboticized Master version of Sonic the Hedgehog) VS Bomb Man, Guts Man, Cut Man, Elec Man, Ice Man, Fire Man, Time Man and Oil Man.
- **Sonic the Hedgehog: Worlds Unite Battles** #1 (July 2015)
  - Expands upon the following fight scenes from Worlds Unite:
    - Sonic the Hedgehog VS Zavok, Zeena and Zor of the Deadly Six.
    - Sticks the Badger VS Roll.
    - Knuckles the Echidna VS Break Man.

== Reprints ==
Trade Paperbacks have also been released, typically collecting older, hard-to-find issues and compiling them in a single volume. These include:

=== Early Specials ===
- Sonic Firsts (1998) (Includes the first appearances of Sonic the Hedgehog, Princess Sally Acorn, Bunnie Rabbot, Super Sonic, and Knuckles the Echidna, taking stories from issue #0 of the original Sonic Miniseries, and issues #3, #4, and #13 of the regular series. The stories are edited to give both Sally her modern brown color and Rotor his modern name instead of the Boomer one. A special electronic edition of this comic is among the special features in the Sonic Mega Collection game. The foreword is by Paul Castiglia, a former editor of the Sonic comics.)
- Sonic: The Beginning (2003) (A reprint of the original Sonic Miniseries, with a foreword by their author Michael Gallagher) (Eventually rebranded Sonic Archives #0 in February 2009)

=== Sonic Archives ===
- Sonic Archives #1 (December 2006) (A reprint of issues #1–4 of the regular series)
- Sonic Archives #2 (January 2007) (A reprint of issues #5–8 of the regular series)
- Sonic Archives #3 (June 2007) (A reprint of issues #9–12 of the regular series)
- Sonic Archives #4 (April 2007) (A reprint of issues #13–16 of the regular series)
- Sonic Archives #5 (September 2007) (A reprint of issues #17–20 of the regular series)
- Sonic Archives #6 (October 2007) (A reprint of issues # 21–24 of the regular series)
- Sonic Archives #7 (June 2008) (A reprint of issues #25–28 of the regular series)
- Sonic Archives #8 (August 2008) (A reprint of issues #29–32 of the regular series)
- Sonic Archives #9 (October 2008) (A reprint of issues #33–36 of the regular series)
- Sonic Archives #0 (December 2008) (An Archives rebranding of Sonic: The Beginning)
- Sonic Archives #10 (March 2009) (A reprint of issues #37–40 of the regular series)
- Sonic Archives #11 (August 2009) (A reprint of issues #41–44 of the regular series)
- Sonic Archives #12 (February 2010) (A reprint of issues #45–48 of the regular series)
- Sonic Archives #13 (August 2010) (A reprint of issue #49 of the regular series, the Sonic #50: Director's Cut Super Special and Sonic Super Special #4, 5 and 6)
- Sonic Archives #14 (December 2010) (A reprint of issues #51–54 of the regular series)
- Sonic Archives #15 (June 2011) (A reprint of issues #55–58 of the regular series)
- Sonic Archives #16 (October 2011) (A reprint of issues #59–62 of the regular series)
- Sonic Archives #17 (February 2012) (A reprint of issues #63–66 of the regular series and Sonic Super Special #15)
- Sonic Archives #18 (July 2012) (A reprint of issues #67–70 of the regular series)
- Sonic Archives #19 (December 2012) (A reprint of issues #71–74 of the regular series)
- Sonic Archives #20 (March 2013) (A reprint of issues #75–78 of the regular series)
- Sonic Archives #21 (August 2013) (A reprint of issues #79–82 of the regular series)
- Sonic Archives #22 (February 2014) (A reprint of issues #83–84 of the regular series and Sonic Super Special #13)
- Sonic Archives #23 (September 2014) (A reprint of issues #85–87 of the regular series and Sonic Super Special #14)
- Sonic Archives #24 (February 2015) (A reprint of issues #88-91 of the regular series)

==== Cancelled releases ====
- Sonic Archives #25 (A reprint of issues #92-95 of the regular series)
- Sonic Archives #26 (A reprint of issues #96-99 of the regular series)

=== Knuckles Archives ===
- Knuckles Archives #1 (September 2011) (A reprint of issues #1–3 of the Knuckles miniseries and #1–3 of the spin-off series.)
- Knuckles Archives #2 (April 2012) (A reprint of issues #4–9 of the spin-off series)
- Knuckles Archives #3 (October 2012) (A reprint of issues #10–15 of the spin-off series)
- Knuckles Archives #4 (April 2013) (A reprint of issues #16–21 of the spin-off series)

==== Cancelled releases ====
- Knuckles Archives #5 (A reprint of issues #22–27 of the spin-off series)
- Knuckles Archives #6 (A reprint of issues #28–32 of the spin-off series)

=== Sonic Select ===
- Sonic Select #1 (May 2008) (A reprint of the 48 page specials, "Sonic In Your Face", "Sonic & Knuckles", "Sonic Triple Trouble", and one story, "The Substitute Freedom Fighters" from "Sonic Live")
- Sonic Select #2 (December 2008) (A reprint of the 48 page specials, "Knuckles' Chaotix", "Super Sonic VS. Hyper Knuckles", "Mecha Madness" and part 2 of "Knuckles' Quest" as seen in "Sonic Live")
- Sonic Select #3 (February 2011) (A reprint of the 48 page Sonic Super Specials, "Battle Royal", "Brave New World" and "Return of the King", "Eel of Fortune" from "Mecha Madness" and "Bugged Bunny" from "Sonic Blast")
- Sonic Select #4: Zone Wars (December 2011) (A reprint of the 48 page Sonic Super Specials, #8, #10, #12 & #14 plus content from "Sonic Blast")
- Sonic Select #5 (May 2012) (A reprint of the 48 page Sonic Super Specials, "Sonic Kids", "Sonic Kids 2" and "Girls Rule!"
- Sonic Select #6 (October 2012) (the entire Sonic Quest Mini-Series plus the special 2010 & 2011 Free Comic Book Day stories)
- Sonic Select #7 (March 2013) (the entire Princess Sally Mini-Series, "My Special Friend" from Knuckles #29 and Sonic #222)
- Sonic Select #8 (September 2013) (the entire Tails Mini-Series plus "Submersible Rehearsal" from Sonic Triple Trouble, "Growing Pains" from Sonic #28 & #29 and "The Chosen One" from #149 & #150)
- Sonic Select #9: The Games (April 2014) (A reprint of issues #160–161, #180, #191, #193, #197, #219 and #230, Sonic Super Special Magazine #3, #9 & #10, Sonic Universe #45, Sonic Super Digest #5, the special Sonic Lost World comic & the special Sonic & the Secret Rings comic)
- Sonic Select #10 (January 2015) (A reprint of Sonic the Hedgehog Free Comic Book Day 2007, "Some Enchantra Evening: Part 1" from Sabrina the Teenage Witch #28, Sonic Super Special #8, #10, Sonic the Hedgehog #247, #252, Sonic the Hedgehog Free Comic Book Day 2014, Sonic Super Digest #8 and #9)

=== Best of... ===
- Best of Sonic the Hedgehog #1: Comics (May 2012) (special reprint of the entire "Mecha Madness", "Rage against the Machine", the ending to "Endgame", "Order of Chaos" and "Future Tense")
- Best of Sonic the Hedgehog #2: Villains (August 2013) (special reprint of "Dark Tidings", "Dark Hearts", "Lost in the Moment", "Forged in Fire", "Babylon Rising" and "Scrambled")
- Best of Sonic the Hedgehog #3: Rivals (cancelled)
- Best of Sonic the Hedgehog Comics #4: Ultimate Edition (February 2015) (special reprint of "Race Against the Machine", "Mecha Madness", "Future Tense", "Lost in the Moment", "Dark Hearts", "Forged in Fire", "Babylon Rising", "Line in the Sand", "Endangered Species", "The Great Chaos Caper", "I Am", "Shadow Fall", and "Father and Son")

=== Sonic Universe ===
- Sonic Universe #1: The Shadow Saga (September 2011) (A reprint of #1–4 containing the arc "The Shadow Saga")
- Sonic Universe #2: 30 Years Later (March 2012) (A reprint of #5–8 + #131 containing the arc "30 Years Later")
- Sonic Universe #3: Knuckles Returns (August 2012) (A reprint of #9–12 + #186 containing the arc "Knuckles Returns")
- Sonic Universe #4: Journey to the East (February 2013) (A reprint of #13–16 + #212 containing the arc "Journey to the East")
- Sonic Universe #5: The Tails Adventures (June 2013) (A reprint of #17–20 containing the arc "The Tails Adventures")
- Sonic Universe #6: Treasure Team Tango (November 2013) (A reprint of #21–24 + #217 containing the arc "Treasure Team Tango")
- Sonic Universe #7: Silver Saga (April 2014) (A reprint of #25–28 containing the arc "Silver Saga")
- Sonic Universe #8: Scourge: Lockdown (August 2014) (A reprint of #29–32 containing the arc "Scourge: Lockdown")

==== Cancelled releases ====
- Sonic Universe #9: Babylon Rising (A reprint of #33–36 containing the arc "Babylon Rising")
- Sonic Universe #10: Scrambled (A reprint of #37-40)
- Sonic Universe #11: Secret Freedom (A reprint of #41-44)
- Sonic Universe #12: Chaotix Quest (A reprint of #46-49)
- Sonic Universe Sagas #1: Pirate Plunder Panic (A reprint of #55-58)
- Sonic Universe Sagas #2: Shadow Fall (A reprint of #59-62)

=== Sonic The Hedgehog ===
- Sonic The Hedgehog 1: Countdown to Chaos (September 2014) (A reprint of #252-256)
- Sonic The Hedgehog 2: The Chase (February 2015) (A reprint of #257-259 and Sonic Comic Origins #1-4)
- Sonic The Hedgehog 3: Waves of Change (August 2016) (A reprint of #260-263)
- Sonic The Hedgehog 4: Control (November 2016) (A reprint of #264-267)

==== Cancelled releases ====
- Sonic The Hedgehog 5: Champions (A reprint of #268-271)
- Sonic The Hedgehog 6: Planetary Pieces (A reprint of #272 and #276-279)
- Sonic The Hedgehog 7: Keys to Victory (A reprint of #280-283)

=== Sonic Saga ===
- Sonic Saga 1: Darkest Storm (September 2012) (selections from issues #162–167)
- Sonic Saga 2: Order from Chaos (April 2013) (selections from issues #168–172)
- Sonic Saga 3: Eggman Empire (July 2013) (selections from issues #173–176 + #160-161)
- Sonic Saga 4: House of Cards (October 2013) (selections from issues #177–180 + #129)
- Sonic Saga 5: Evil Reborn (July 2014) (selections from issues #181–184 + #186)
- Sonic Saga 6: Mogul Rising (November 2014) (selections from issues #185-189)
- Sonic Saga 7: The Dark Mirror (April 2015) (selections from issues #190-194)

==== Cancelled releases ====
- Sonic Saga 8: Hedgehog Havoc! (selections from issues #195-198)
- Sonic Saga 9: The Eggman Wars (selections from issues #199-202)
- Sonic Saga 10: On the Run! (selections from issues #203-206)

=== Sonic Legacy ===
- Sonic Legacy Series #1 (October 2011) (A black and white reprint of issues #0–3 from the Original Sonic miniseries and #1–16 of the regular series)
- Sonic Legacy Series #2 (October 2012) (A black and white reprint of issues #17–36 of the regular series)
- Sonic Legacy Series #3 (December 2013) (A black and white reprint of issues #37–54 of the regular series)
- Sonic Legacy Series #4 (December 2014, Digital Only) (A black and white reprint of issues #55-74 of the regular series)

=== Worlds Collide ===
- Sonic/Mega Man: Worlds Collide Vol. 1: Kindred Spirits (Published December 2013)
  - Reprints: Mega Man #24, Sonic Universe #51, Sonic the Hedgehog #248, and Mega Man #25
- Sonic/Mega Man: Worlds Collide Vol. 2: Into The Warzone (Published February 2014)
  - Reprints: Sonic Universe #52, Sonic the Hedgehog #249, Mega Man #26, and Sonic Universe #53
- Sonic/Mega Man: Worlds Collide Vol. 3: Chaos Clash (Published May 2014)
  - Reprints: Sonic the Hedgehog #250, Mega Man #27, Sonic Universe #54, and Sonic the Hedgehog #251
- Sonic the Hedgehog/Mega Man: Worlds Collide: The Complete Epic (Published January 2016)
  - Reprints: Sonic the Hedgehog #248-252, Sonic Universe #50-54, and Mega Man #23-28

==== Cancelled releases ====
- Sonic/Mega Man: Worlds Collide Deluxe Edition (336-page Hardcover Book)
- Sonic/Mega Man: Worlds Collide Super Deluxe Edition (352-page Hardcover Book)

=== Worlds Unite ===
- Sonic the Hedgehog/Mega Man: Worlds Unite Volume 1: Deadly Fusion (Published July 2016)
  - Reprints: Sonic Universe #76, Sonic Boom #8, Sonic the Hedgehog #273, Mega Man #50, Sonic the Hedgehog: Worlds Unite Battles #1, and Mega Man: Worlds Unite Battles #1
- Sonic the Hedgehog/Mega Man: Worlds Unite Volume 2: Broken Bonds (Published November 2016)
  - Reprints: Sonic Universe #77, Sonic Boom #9, Sonic the Hedgehog #274, Mega Man #50 and 51, Sonic the Hedgehog: Worlds Unite Battles #1, and Mega Man: Worlds Unite Battles #1

==== Cancelled releases ====
- Sonic the Hedgehog/Mega Man: Worlds Unite Volume 3: Allied Forces
  - Reprints: Sonic Universe #78, Sonic Boom #10, Sonic the Hedgehog #275, Mega Man #52, Sonic the Hedgehog: Worlds Unite Battles #1, and Mega Man: Worlds Unite Battles #1

=== Sonic Boom ===
- Sonic Boom Volume 1: The Big Boom (Published September 2016)
  - Reprints: Sonic boom #1-4
- Sonic Boom Volume 2: Boom Shaka-Lacka (Published December 2016)
  - Reprints: Sonic boom #5-7 and #11

=== Sonic Super Special Magazine ===
- Sonic Super Special Magazine #1 (October 2011) (selections from issues #226, 160, 161, 199, and 200. This also includes a character profile of the Freedom Fighters and part 1 of the Mobius Timeline.)
- Sonic Super Special Magazine #2 (January 2012) (selections from issues #80-84 and Sonic Super Special #13. This also includes character profiles of the United Federation and Chaos and part 2 of the Mobius Timeline. This issue is a look back on Sonic Adventure.)
- Sonic Super Special Magazine #3 (April 2012) (selections from issues #25, 213, 214, and 176. This also includes a new story called Time for a Comeback (this particular story is to promote Sonic the Hedgehog 4: Episode II) and part 3 of the Mobius Timeline.)
- Sonic Super Special Magazine #4 (July 2012) (selections from issues #132-142, 144, 166, and 167. This also includes part 4 of the Mobius Timeline. This issue is a look back on the Mobius 25 Years Later story arcs.)
- Sonic Super Special Magazine #5 (October 2012) (selections from issues #198 and 216. This also includes 24 pull out posters made from various issue covers and part 5 of the Mobius Timeline.)
- Sonic Super Special Magazine #6 (February 2013) (selections from issues #201, 203, 204, 209, 217, 218, 12, and Sonic Universe #13. This also includes part 6 of the Mobius Timeline.)
- Sonic Super Special Magazine #7 (May 2013) (selections from issues #230, 7, 14, and 29 and Sonic the Hedgehog Free Comic Book Day 2007. This also includes various character profiles taken from The Complete Sonic Comic Encyclopedia as a preview for it called Classic Who's Who and a cover gallery for various Sonic graphic novel series’.)
- Sonic Super Special Magazine #8 (August 2013) (selections from issues #215, 216, 232, 235, 160, and 161, Sonic Universe #17, and Sonic Free Comic Book Day 2011. This also includes a character profile of Blaze the cat and her world and stickers to create your own Sonic scenes.)
- Sonic Super Special Magazine #9 (November 2013) (selections from issues #177 and 225, Sonic Universe #21 and Sonic Halloween Comic Fest 2013 (this particular story is to promote Sonic Lost World).)
- Sonic Super Special Magazine #10 (January 2014) (selections from issues #247, 252, 171, Sonic Universe #1, and 33 . This also includes a new story called Sonic Dash based on the mobile game with the same name.)
- Sonic Super Special Magazine #11 (March 2014) (selections from issues #250, 253, 254, Sonic Universe #25, and Sonic/Mega Man X Free Comic Book Day 2014.)
- Sonic Super Special Magazine #12 (September 2014) (selections from issues #255, 256, 180, Sonic Universe #45, and 55 . This also includes the inside scoop of Sonic Boom and the Total Eclipse story arc, Pull Up Posters of various Sega Genesis games, and a preview of Sonic Select #9: The Games.)
- Sonic Super Special Magazine #13 (January 2015) (selections from issues #264, 258, Sonic Universe #59, 29, and Sonic Boom #1.)

==== Cancelled releases ====
- Sonic Super Special Magazine #14
- Sonic Super Special Magazine #15

=== Sonic Super Digest ===
- Sonic Super Digest #1 (November 2012) (selections from issues #219, 193, 12, 29, 114, 142, 172, 216, 6, 86, and 87.)
- Sonic Super Digest #2 (April 2013) (selections from issues #191, 185, 186, 136, Super Sonic vs. Hyper Knuckles, Sonic & Knuckles: Mecha Madness, Sonic Super Special #1, and Sonic Super Special Magazine #3. This also includes a profile of Angel Island.)
- Sonic Super Digest #3 (July 2013) (selections from issues #30, 26, 34, 173, 142, 143, 162, 177, Sonic Universe #4, and 3.)
- Sonic Super Digest #4 (October 2013) (selections from issues #227, 228, 160, 161, 236, and Sonic Universe #2.)
- Sonic Super Digest #5 (January 2014) (selections from issues #242, 26, 37, 237, 238, 153, 246, and Sonic Free Comic Book Day 2010. This also includes a new story called Sonic Jump based on the mobile game with the same name.)
- Sonic Super-Sized Digest #6 (March 2014) (selections from issues #1-8. This also includes the "Then and Now" features which are a series of one-paged articles located at different points in the issue which give a short description of the comic series' main cast of characters from Sonic the Hedgehog #252 and onward.)
- Sonic Super Digest #7 (May 2014) (selections from issues #203, 204, 207, 10, 172, 23, and Sonic the Hedgehog Free Comic Book Day 2014.)
- Sonic Super Digest #8 (August 2014) (selections from issues #10, 163, 164, 4, 37, 232, 23, 167, Sonic Universe #17, 18, and Sonic Blast. This also includes the new story Sonic Comic Origins: Little Lost Soldier.)
- Sonic Super Digest #9 (October 2014) (selections from issues #257, 260, 217, Sonic Universe #19, and 20. This also includes the new story Sonic Comic Origins: The Belle in the Machine, articles of Our Top 10 Favorite Things about the new Sonic Comic Universe, articles of Take a Closer Look at the New Designs for the Original Freedom Fighters, articles of The Planet-sized Jigsaw Puzzle!, and Pin-Up pages of various covers.)
- Sonic Super Digest #10 (December 2014) (selections from issues #261, 262, 218, Sonic Universe #63, 64, and Sonic Boom #1.)
- Sonic Super-Sized Comics Digest #11 (March 2015) (selections from issues #260-265, 230, Sonic Universe #67-68, 21, 22, Sonic Boom #2, and Sonic Super Special Magazine #10. This also includes the new story Sonic Comic Origins: Nicole.)
- Sonic Super Digest #12 (June 2015) (selections from issues #266, Sonic Universe #23, 24, 69, and Mega Man #24. This also includes the new story Sonic Comic Origins: The Traitor.)
- Sonic Super Digest #13 (August 2015) (selections from issues #267, 268, 269, Sonic Universe #70, 71, and Sonic Boom #3.)
- Sonic Super Digest #14 (November 2015) (selections from issues #270, 271, 272, Sonic Universe #75, 72, and Sonic Boom #3.)
- Sonic Super Digest #15 (January 2016) (selections from issues #276, Sonic Universe #79, 33, 73, and Sonic Boom #4. This also includes the new story Sonic Comic Origins: Castaway.)
- Sonic Super Digest #16 (April 2016) (selections from issues Sonic Boom #5, 6, Sonic Universe #80, 74, and Archie Sonic Halloween Comic Fest 2013.)
- Sonic Super Digest #17 (August 2016) (selections from issues #277, 278, Sonic Universe #81, 82, and Sonic Boom #7.)

==== Cancelled releases ====
- Sonic Super Digest #18
- Sonic Super Digest #19

=== Sonic: Genesis ===
(April 2012) (special reprint of the entire "Genesis" story arc, "Two Steps Back", and the last six pages of "One Step Forward")

=== Sonic Comics Spectacular: Speed of Sound ===
(February 2016) (special reprint of "The Light in the Dark", "Consequences", "Sonic Dash", "A Nice Day to Start Again", "Waves of Change", "Treasure Team Tango", "Total Eclipse", "Champions", "A Ray of Hope", "The Silver Age", "Back in Business", and "Babylon Rising")

== Other ==
=== Sonic the Hedgehog: The Complete Sonic Comic Encyclopedia ===
(October 2012) (an encyclopedia special about the entire comic series from the beginning up to Sonic the Hedgehog #241. Sections include "Sonic and the Freedom Fighters", "Knuckles and the Chaotix", "Royalty and Government", "Friends and Family", "Knuckles Legacy", "Gods of Mobius", "Shadow and G.U.N", "Freedom Fighters of the World", "The Eggman Empire", "The Wicked Echidnas", "Villains of Planet Mobius", "Other Worlds", "Magical Talismans", "Mobian Technology", "The World of Mobius Prime", "Mobius Timeline", and "The Future?...")
