= Winspear =

Winspear is a surname. Notable people with the surname include:

- Jacqueline Winspear (born 1955), English writer
- Violet Winspear (1928–1989), English writer
