= A Glimpse Inside the Mind of Charles Swan III =

2012 American film directed by Roman Coppola

- Theatrical release poster
- Directed by: Roman Coppola
- Written by: Roman Coppola
- Produced by: Roman Coppola; Youree Henley
- Starring: Charlie Sheen; Katheryn Winnick; Bill Murray; Jason Schwartzman; Patricia Arquette; Mary Elizabeth Winstead; Fabianne Therese
- Cinematography: Nick Beal
- Edited by: Robert Schafer
- Music by: Liam Hayes; Roger Neill
- Production companies: American Zoetrope; The Directors Bureau
- Distributed by: A24; FilmBuff
- Release dates: November 15, 2012 (Rome Film Festival); February 8, 2013 (United States)
- Running time: 86 minutes
- Country: United States
- Language: English
- Budget: $12 million
- Box office: $210,565

A Glimpse Inside the Mind of Charles Swan III is a 2012 American comedy film written, directed, and produced by Roman Coppola. It stars Charlie Sheen, Jason Schwartzman, Bill Murray, Katheryn Winnick and Patricia Arquette.

The film premiered on November 15, 2012 at the Rome Film Festival with a limited release in the United States on February 8, 2013 by A24 as the company's first release. Upon release, the film was panned by critics and flopped in the box office, grossing only $210,565 against a $12 million budget.

== Plot ==
In the 1970s, successful graphic designer and ladies' man Charles Swan III is dumped by his girlfriend Ivana, and it throws his life into a tailspin. He doesn't know whether he loves her, hates her, wants her back, or never wants to see her again. Along with his best friend, Kirby and his manager, Saul, Charles starts to suffer from nightmares, fever dreams of past relationships and hits rock bottom as he tries to recover from the recent breakup and tries to turn his life around.

== Cast ==
- Charlie Sheen as Charles Swan III
- Jason Schwartzman as Kirby Star
- Bill Murray as Saul
- Katheryn Winnick as Ivana
- Patricia Arquette as Izzy Swan, Charles' sister
- Aubrey Plaza as Marnie
- Mary Elizabeth Winstead as Kate
- Dermot Mulroney as Doctor
- Richard Edson as Sanchez
- Stephen Dorff as Stephen
- Colleen Camp as Karen
- Angela Lindvall as Veiled Woman
- C.C. Sheffield as Secretary
- Tyne Stecklein as Penny
- Lindsey McLevis as Lindsey
- Lexy Hulme as Yvonne
- Fabianne Therese as Kirby Star's Girlfriend
- Bar Paly as Maria Carla
- Margarita Kallas as Josephine
- Maxine Bahns as Mom
- Alim Kouliev as Russian Cabbie
- Liam Hayes as Himself

== Production ==
If you've ever been through a bad break-up, all you want to do is think about it and process. That's kind of what the project is. A character study of a guy in this state of mind with Charlie as a very dynamic and imaginative character, so there's a lot of fantasy sequences and crazy shit.

— Roman Coppola

Roman Coppola began development on the film in 2004.

Filmed on location in Santa Clarita and Los Angeles, California.

=== Music ===
The soundtrack of A Glimpse Inside the Mind of Charles Swan III was written by pop musician Liam Hayes, of whom director Roman Coppola is a fan. It is Hayes's first and only soundtrack.

== Release ==
First premiered at the Rome Film Festival in November 2012.

On January 8, 2013, the film was released through video on demand and was released in a limited release in the United States on February 8, 2013.

=== Home media ===
It was released on Blu-ray and DVD on May 14, 2013 in North America.

== Reception ==
=== Box office ===
The film opened at #64 with US$12,000 in its limited release at two theaters the week of February 8. The following weekend, the weekend of February 15, Charles Swan III expanded to 18 theaters and gained an 81.6% increase. As of July 11, 2013, the domestic total of A Glimpse Inside the Mind of Charles Swan III is US$45,350, and in Russia the film has grossed $134,473, with an additional $26,999 in Mexico.

=== Critical response ===
A Glimpse Inside the Mind of Charles Swan III received an overwhelmingly negative response from critics. The film holds a 16% "rotten" rating on Rotten Tomatoes, based on 56 reviews, and an average rating of 3.5/10. The site's consensus reads: "Tiresomely self-indulgent and lacking any storytelling cohesion, this Glimpse Inside the Mind finds little food for thought." Metacritic gave the film a 28/100 "generally unfavorable" approval rating based on 22 reviews.

Nathan Rabin of The A.V. Club gave the movie an F, saying that "it isn't a movie so much as a feature-length perfume commercial for a Charlie Sheen signature cologne with gorgeous packaging and absolutely nothing inside." The Dallas Observer said that the film "might generously be described as cut-and-paste – or more accurately as 'throw stuff to the wall and see what sticks'" and it was "a clunker". The New York Daily News gave Charles Swan III one star out of five, saying that "you want to swat it away" and that "maybe with this out of his [Coppola's] system, he'll think up something better." Time said that the film "does not lead to a deeper understanding of Charlie Sheen. It does, however, demonstrate his compulsion for poor judgment and bad choices. But weren't we already convinced of that?"

Lisa Schwarzbaum, reviewer for Entertainment Weekly, gave the film a C and a milder response, writing, "The idea of this home-movie-with-higher-production-values directed by Roman Coppola is no less sweet for being unoriginal ... The execution, on the other hand, is perilously self-absorbed, a private party involving friends, family, too many fantasy sequences, and an abundance of costume and set design to create a notion of a stylized L.A. spritzed with eau de Playboy."
