= Like a Stranger (EP) =

EP by Kitten
- Released: August 27, 2013
- Genre: Indie pop, alternative rock
- Length: 29:28
- Label: Elektra Records

Kitten chronology
Cut It Out (2011)	Like a Stranger (2013)	Kitten (2014)

Singles from Like a Stranger
- 1. "Like a Stranger" Released: August 7, 2013

Like a Stranger is an extended play (EP) by American indie rock band Kitten, released on August 27, 2013 by Elektra. It is the third EP the band has produced.

== Background ==
Produced by Chad Anderson and Nick Jons, Kitten's third EP includes six songs with a running time of 29:31. The first single off the EP, titled "Like a Stranger", debuted on August 7, 2013, along with an available pre-order for the EP. Spin described the title track as "a dark but glitzy union of post-punk melodrama and New Wave synth symphonics."

Kitten toured in the fall of 2013 with Charli XCX in support of the EP.

== Track listing ==
All tracks are written by Chloe Chaidez and Chad Anderson, except where noted.

No.	Title	Length
1.	"Like a Stranger"	5:09
2.	"Yesterday" (Chloe Chaidez, Julian Chaidez, Chad Anderson)	3:57
3.	"I'll Be Your Girl"	4:47
4.	"Doubt"	4:49
5.	"Graffiti Soul"	4:27
6.	"King of Kings" (C. Chaidez, Anderson, Nick Jons)	6:22
Total length:		29:31

Vinyl edition
No.	Title	Length
7.	"Diamond"	4:39

== Release history ==
Date	Format	Label
27 August 2013	Digital download	Elektra Records
