= The Battle Royale =

Electronic dance band from Minnesota

The Battle Royale was an electronic dance group from Minneapolis, Minnesota signed to Afternoon Records. The group disbanded and its members are currently working on other projects. John Pelant and Mark Ritsema formed Night Moves, which Ritsema eventually left to focus on his solo project Suzie, and Grace Fiddler joined the group One for the Team.

== Former members ==
- Grace Fiddler (vocals, bass)
- John Pelant (vocals, guitar)
- Mark Ritsema (vocals, synth)
- Sam Robertson (vocals, organ)

== Discography ==
- Sparkle Dust Fantasy, (Album, 2006)
- Wake Up, Thunderbabe, (Album, 2007)
