= Hushdrops =

Rock band from Chicago, Illinois, USA

- Origin: Chicago, Illinois, United States
- Genres: Rock
- Years active: 1990–2025
- Label: various
- Members: John San Juan, Jim Shapiro
- Past members: Joe Camarillo

Hushdrops are a three-piece rock band from Chicago featuring current and former members of Veruca Salt, Liam Hayes and Plush, The Waco Brothers (through 2020), The Webb Brothers (who recorded and released a cover of Hushdrops' "Summer People" as a UK single in 2000), Josh Caterer, Kevin Tihista, and NRBQ. The band's 2004 debut album Volume One was followed in 2014 by the (mono) double album Tomorrow. Drummer Joe Camarillo died unexpectedly in January 2021, just as the group were completing their third album (The Static). In August 2021, it was announced that Pravda Records would release that album in November of that year, partly in tribute to Camarillo.

Hushdrops resumed performing and recording in September 2021 and into 2026 with NRBQ and JD McPherson drummer John Perrin.

== Members ==
- John San Juan
- Jim Shapiro

=== Former members ===
- Joe Camarillo (born September 3, 1968 - died January 24, 2021; Number Nine, Gear, Skull Orchard, Bad Luck Jonathan, Waco Brothers, NRBQ) - drums

== Discography ==
- Volume One (Hushdrops album) (2003)
- Tomorrow (Hushdrops album) (2014)
- The Static (Hushdrops album) (2021)
