= Cars (Now, Now Every Children album) =

Studio album by Now, Now
- Released: February 27, 2009
- Genre: Indie pop
- Label: Tapete

Now, Now chronology
Cars (2009)	Threads (2012)

Professional ratings
Review scores
Source	Rating
Punknews	3.5/5 stars

Cars is the debut studio album by the indie rock band Now, Now (Now, Now Every Children). It was released February 27, 2009 on Tapete Records.

== Track listing ==
No.	Title	Length
1.	"Not One, But Two"	3:12
2.	"Everyone You Know"	2:40
3.	"Have You Tried"	4:22
4.	"Sleep Through Summer"	2:40
5.	"Friends With My Sister"	4:46
6.	"In My Chest"	2:32
7.	"Headlights"	3:44
8.	"In The City"	4:00
9.	"We Know Martha Webber"	2:48
10.	"Little Brother"	3:26
11.	"Cars"	4:21
Total length:		38:31
