= Liam Hayes =

American songwriter

- Also known as: Plush
- Origin: Chicago
- Genres: Ork-pop
- Years active: 1994–present
- Label: www.candlewick-lake.com
- Website: www.liamhayesandplush.com

Liam Hayes, professionally known as Plush since 1992, is an American songwriter and performer, originally from Chicago, Illinois, United States.

His discography includes three critically acclaimed records: More You Becomes You (1998), Fed (2002), and Bright Penny (2009). In 2000, Hayes appeared as himself performing "Soaring and Boring" in the film High Fidelity.

== Early recording years, More You Becomes You (1994-1998) ==
Between 1994 and 1998 Liam Hayes recorded and released two singles, 1994's debut single "Found A Little Baby", and 1997's "No Education". 1998 saw the release of Hayes' debut solo album, More You Becomes You.

== Fed (1999-2002) ==
After the release of More You Becomes You, Hayes began writing and collecting songs for his second studio album. The album combined rock arrangements with big band instrumentation and full string sections. The end result was Fed, which was released in 2002.

== Bright Penny (2005-2009) ==
Around 2005, Hayes began to work on his third proper studio album. The sessions were spread between L.A., New York, Michigan, and Chicago and involved numerous musicians including Brian Wilson's rhythm section and legendary Chicago Blues and Jazz drummer Morris Jennings. Almost a year to the day of the belated UK release of Plush’s Fed, Broken Horse Records announced the release of its follow up album, Bright Penny.

Although Bright Penny appeared relatively quickly after the UK release of Fed, its roots go as far back as the initial release and subsequent non-release of Fed. Whilst dealing with the frustrations that accompanied this situation, and dealing with profound personal loss, Hayes managed to maintain his love of music and his craft of songwriting that had been at the centre of his life since he was a child. As recording began and the album’s track listing began to take shape by selecting songs both old and new from his expanding songbook, a narrative of hope, loss and the love of music began to emerge as the record’s theme.

Music has defined me and it has always been there with me. I have had a lifelong relationship with it. It pretty much saved me when nothing else could. It has also, at points, pushed me close to the edge. That’s the kind of friend it is. The idea of music being one’s greatest ally is explored in “ So Much Music”. Other songs such as “Take A Chance”, present a theme of self transformation, while “Look Up, Look Down” offers a picture of the struggle to survive.

Bright Penny was released in 2009.

== Current activities ==
In 2013, Hayes scored the soundtrack to the Roman Coppola film A Glimpse Inside the Mind of Charles Swan III. “It was surreal,” says Hayes about appearing in the film as an actor. “I haven’t played any gigs on a beach with a Hammond organ, you know?” Hayes, who has made music under the name Plush since the early ’90s, was contacted by Coppola after the director became a huge fan. “I just got so absorbed by his music,” Coppola told GQ (UK) about Hayes and Plush.

The result of this appreciation was Coppola approaching Hayes when writing the script for the film. “It evolved over time,” says Hayes. “When we met to discuss the project we talked about possible songs. After some time had passed, we talked some more, I added a few more songs, and I ended up doing the entire score.” Hayes also appears in the film performing the tune “So Much Music.” It was not his first time onscreen: In 2000 he appeared in High Fidelity, performing his song "Soaring and Boring". His imaginative, atmospheric, cinematic style is well suited to movie soundtracks, and his Charles Swan soundtrack is made up of songs from Fed, Bright Penny and the forthcoming Korp Sole Roller along with music and symphonic underscore written specifically for the film.

In 2014, Hayes toured as support act for Christopher Owens, utilizing a new three-piece version of Plush with John San Juan of Hushdrops on bass and Eric Colin on drums.

== Discography ==
=== Singles ===
- "Found A Little Baby" (1994)
- "No Education" (1997)

=== Studio albums ===
- More You Becomes You (1998)
- Fed (2002)
- Bright Penny (2009)
- Korp Sole Roller (2014)
- Slurrup (2015)
- Mirage Garage (2018)

=== Soundtrack albums ===
- A Glimpse Inside the Mind of Charles Swan III (Music From the Motion Picture) (2013)
