= The Poison Control Center =

American indie rock band

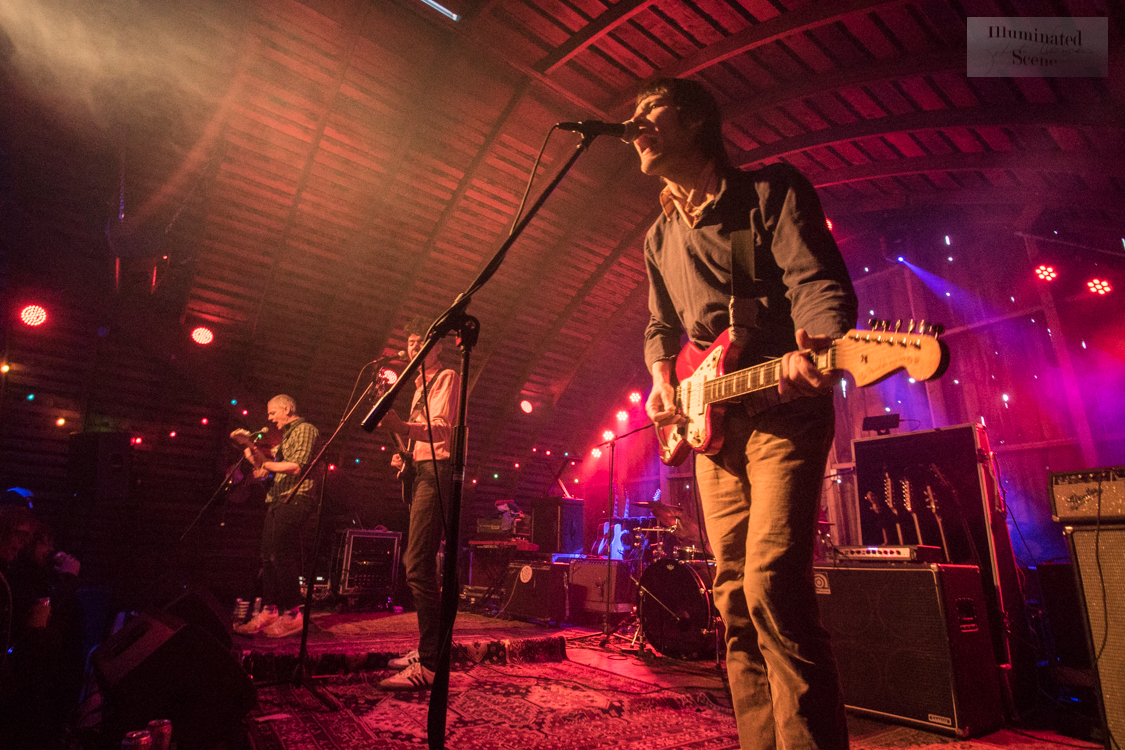

Background information
- Origin: Ames, Iowa
- Genres: Indie rock
- Label: Afternoon Records Bi-Fi Records Happy Happy Birthday To Me Records
- Members: Devin Frank; Donald Ephraim Curtis; Joseph Terry; Patrick Tape Fleming
- Past members: Natalie Uhl; Ryan C. Meier
- Website: thepoisoncontrolcenter.com

The Poison Control Center is a US indie rock band from Ames, Iowa. The quartet's sound is based on bands of the 1960s, such as The Beatles and The Beach Boys, and it has borrowed from other genres since its inception. Its earlier recordings have the lo-fi sound and pop rock sensibilities of the 1990s, as did Guided by Voices and Pavement; later albums sound more polished.

== Discography ==
- The Go-Go Music Show (2001)
- Kennedy (2006)
- Glory Us (2006)
- A Collage Of Impressions (2007)
- Sad Sour Future (2010)
- Stranger Ballet (2011)
