= Magic Shop (recording studio) =

American recording studio in New York City

The Magic Shop was an American independent recording studio located at 49 Crosby Street in the SoHo neighborhood of Lower Manhattan in New York City. Established in 1988 by Steve Rosenthal, The Magic Shop hosted projects by David Bowie, Lou Reed, Foo Fighters, and others.

== History ==
Musician and engineer Steve Rosenthal, who had worked with Herb Abramson at A-1 Sound Studios prior to co-founding Dreamland studios, established the Larry Carswell-designed studio in a loft space at 49 Crosby Street in SoHo in 1988. Roselthal obtained a 32-input Neve mixing console originally commissioned for the BBC's Maida Vale Studios, which was later combined with a 24-input version of the same console to create a custom 56-input console in a project overseen by Rupert Neve himself.

In 1992, the studio gained notoriety with a string of notable album projects from Suzanne Vega, Lou Reed, Sonic Youth, and the Ramones. Producers Dave Sardy, Mitchell Froom, Tchad Blake, and John Agnello discovered the studio, leading to a steady stream of album projects.

In the early 2000s, Magic Shop expanded to add the Blue Room, which offered transfer, restoration, and mastering services, and Rosenthal was hired to remaster the first 22 Rolling Stones album releases.

In 2007, three projects that had been recorded at the Magic Shop, Keane's "Is It Any Wonder?", The Klezmatics Wonder Wheel, and Pink's "Stupid Girls", were nominated for Grammy Awards, reinforcing the studio's success. The following year, the studio expanded the services of the Blue Room by adding a second mastering facility, the Red Room, which Rosenthal shared with Elliot Mazer. In 2009, the studio restored over 100 recordings for a Rounder Records 100-disc reissue series compiled by musicologist Alan Lomax, the collection comprised recordings as old as 1938 from artists including Jelly Roll Morton, Lead Belly, Muddy Waters, Woody Guthrie, and many others.

On May 2, 2011, David Bowie and producer Tony Visconti began recording what would become the artist's album The Next Day (2014). Recording took place in secret; all personnel signed non-disclosure agreements.

In 2014, the Magic Shop and Steve Rosenthal were included in the final episode of Foo Fighters: Sonic Highways American rockumentary miniseries directed by Dave Grohl. At the time, the studio was struggling financially due to rapidly rising rent and outstanding debt. In 2015, David Bowie returned to the studio to record what would be his final studio album, Blackstar.

A dispute with the studio's landlord exacerbated its financial problems. In an effort to help Rosenthal keep the studio afloat, David Grohl contributed approximately $50,000 and even unsuccessfully bid to buy the building, but these efforts failed, and the Magic Shop closed on March 16, 2016.

== Selected list of Magic Shop recordings (by year) ==
- Charles Brown – All My Life (1990)
- Grace Pool – Where We Live (1990)
- Champion Jack Dupree – Forever and Ever (1991)
- Larry Davis – Sooner or Later (1992)
- Brenda Kahn – Epiphany in Brooklyn - (1992)
- Suzanne Vega – 99.9F° (1992)
- Lou Reed – Magic And Loss (1992)
- Sonic Youth – Dirty (1992)
- Ramones – Mondo Bizarro (1992)
- They Might Be Giants - Apollo 18 (1992)
- The Smithereens - A Date with The Smithereens (1994)
- Monster Magnet - Dopes to Infinity (1995)
- The Residents - Hunters (1995)
- Fun Lovin' Criminals - Come Find Yourself (1996)
- Lou Reed - Set the Twilight Reeling (1996)
- Paula Cole - This Fire (1996)
- Suzanne Vega - Nine Objects of Desire (1996)
- Cibo Matto – Super Relax (1997)
- Ron Sexsmith – Other Songs (1997)
- Sheryl Crow - "Tomorrow Never Dies" (1997)
- Medeski Martin & Wood - Combustication (1998)
- Tracy Bonham – Down Here (1998)
- Cibo Matto – Stereo Type A (1999)
- The Smithereens - God Save The Smithereens (1999)
- Björk – Medúlla (2004)
- Ollabelle – Ollabelle (album) (2004)
- Burning Spear - Our Music (2005)
- Marah - If You Didn't Laugh, You'd Cry (2005)
- Keane – Under the Iron Sea (2006)
- The Klezmatics – Wonder Wheel (2006)
- Pink – I'm Not Dead (2006)
- Interpol – Our Love to Admire (2007)
- Burning Spear - Jah Is Real (2008)
- Coldplay – Viva La Vida (2008)
- Bat For Lashes – Two Suns (2009)
- Israel Nash - New York Town (2009)
- Norah Jones – The Fall (2009)
- Arcade Fire - The Suburbs (2010)
- The Gaslight Anthem – American Slang (2010)
- Billie Joe Armstrong and Norah Jones – Foreverly (2013)
- David Bowie – The Next Day (2013)
- Foo Fighters – Sonic Highways (2014)
- David Bowie – Blackstar (2016)
