= Marah (band) =

American rock band

- Marah, Loganton, PA

Background information
- Origin: Philadelphia, Pennsylvania and Brooklyn, New York, United States
- Genres: Rock and roll
- Years active: 1993–present
- Labels: Yep Roc Records, Artemis Records, PHIdelity Records, Valley Farm Songs
- Members: David Bielanko; Serge Bielanko; Adam Garbinski; Mike "Slo Mo" Brenner; Dave Petersen; Mark Sosnoskie
- Past members: Christine Smith; Joe Hooven; Mick Bader; Mark Boyce; Jon Kois; Jamie Mahon; Rich DiNapoli; Danny Metz; Ronnie Vance; Mike Ambs; Jon Wurster; Kirk Henderson; Joe Gorelick; Johnny Pisano; Martin Lynds; Alex Fang; Bruce W. Derr
- Website: www.marahland-usa.com

Marah is an American rock and roll band that formed in the early 1990s and is closely associated with the cities of Philadelphia, Pennsylvania and Brooklyn, New York. The band is known for its intense live performances, classic rock production style, and association with authors Nick Hornby and Sarah Vowell and musicians Bruce Springsteen and Steve Earle.

== History ==
Marah was formed by singer/songwriter/guitarist Dave Bielanko from Conshohocken, Pennsylvania, bass guitarist Danny Metz and drummer Ronnie Vance in 1993. Singer/songwriter/guitarist and harmonica player Serge Bielanko, Dave's older brother, joined the band in 1995.

Several years before Marah formed, Serge and Dave Bielanko (still in high school) were in a band called the Lusty Toms with Michael Lepore, which had a far different sound that resembled the Red Hot Chili Peppers. The Lusty Toms never got signed and distributed several cassette tapes locally.

Marah saw Serge and Dave alter their sound and musical direction. Marah featured Mummers Parade–influenced banjos combined with standard rock instruments to create an eclectic roots rock sound that drew comparisons to early Bruce Springsteen.

Marah recorded two albums together: Let's Cut The Crap & Hook Up Later on Tonight, released on Black Dog Records in 1998, and Kids in Philly, released on Steve Earle's now-defunct E-Squared Records in 2000. Both critically acclaimed records were recorded and produced by the band and recording engineer/producer Paul Smith above an auto repair garage (Frank's Auto Body) in south Philadelphia.

Metz and Vance left the band in 2000, and were replaced by Mick Bader on drums and Joe Hooven on bass. Augmented by Mike "Slo-Mo" Brenner on lap steel, this version of the group toured extensively to support Kids in Philly. Marah performed a song from that CD, "Point Breeze", on Late Night with Conan O'Brien in 2000. Bader and Hooven left Marah in 2001 and were replaced by Jon Kois (drums) and Jamie Mahon (bass) of Philadelphia psychedelic rock band The Three 4 Tens.

The Bielankos, with Kois and Mahon, left for Wales in late 2001 to record their third CD, Float Away With the Friday Night Gods, with former Oasis producer Owen Morris and featuring Bruce Springsteen on vocals and guitar on the title track. It was released on Artemis Records in 2002. This release spurred controversy amongst the band's early supporters due to its decidedly Britpop sound.

In 2003, Marah returned to the auto garage (Frank's Auto Body, aptly renamed The Marage) and recorded their fourth record, 20,000 Streets Under the Sky, and also played a series of shows in late October/early November, much to the delight of their devoted fan base. The CD was released on Yep Roc Records in 2004. The band toured to support this album with Jon Wurster (of indie rock stalwarts Superchunk) on drums, Mike "Slo-Mo" Brenner on lap steel guitar, and Kirk Henderson on bass and keyboards.

=== If You Didn't Laugh, You'd Cry and A Christmas Kind of Town ===
In 2005, the band entered The Magic Shop recording studio in New York City to record their fifth album with the help of Henderson and two new members, guitarist Adam Garbinski and drummer/guitarist Dave Peterson, formerly of the band Squad Five-O. The resulting disc, If You Didn't Laugh, You'd Cry (IYDLYC), met with near-universal critical acclaim. Stephen King, writing in Entertainment Weekly, hailed IYDLYC as the best record of 2005.

If You Didn't Laugh, You'd Cry is an apt enough title, when you consider that this is probably the best rock band in America that nobody knows. Am I being an elitist here, trying to one-up my audience? Nope. Marah is great in the scat, bop, and jive way Springsteen was great on The Wild, the Innocent & the E Street Shuffle. One listen to songs like The Closer and Fat Boy on this amazing record and I think you'll agree. These guys are either the American U2 or close enough for government work.

The release of IYDLYC was complemented by the recording and release of a Christmas album, A Christmas Kind of Town. The band, now solidified as a three-guitar quintet, embarked upon a year-long tour of the US and Europe to support the two albums. Highlights of the tour included Serge Bielanko's intense renditions of "Dishwasher's Dream" from IYDLYC as well as occasional performances of "Reservation Girl," a song the group has never released on a record.

In addition to the release of A Christmas Kind of Town, the band, along with keyboardist and vocalist Christine Smith, wrote and recorded music for lyrics written by This American Life contributor Sarah Vowell entitled "Christmas at Valley Forge." The song, along with other selections from A Christmas Kind of Town, was originally aired on This American Life's Christmas special in December 2005 and was re-released on the holiday EP Counting the Days in 2007.

Marah played at the Bonnaroo Music Festival on June 16, 2006. Performance highlights included a rousing introduction by St. Louis, Missouri scenester/character Beatle Bob and a cover of The Who's "Baba O'Riley." Marah later played the Austin City Limits Music Festival on September 15, 2006, delivering a spirited set in which both Dave and Serge Bielanko jumped over the crowd barriers and into the audience. The audio of this show was released on iTunes on November 7, 2006.

On September 21, 2006, the band released a DVD of a concert in Mataro, Spain (which was originally recorded and circulated as a fan bootleg) entitled Sooner or Later in Spain.

=== Angels of Destruction ===
Marah, with Christine Smith now a full-time member, entered Nashville's 16 Ton Recording Studios in August 2006 to record songs for a new record. In April 2007, the group recorded and mixed additional songs at Brooklyn, New York's Excello Recording. In June, Marah announced that the new record, Angels of Destruction!, would be released on January 8, 2008, and previewed the album at a concert/listening party in Philadelphia on September 8, 2007. Angels of Destruction! was preceded by a 6-song 10" EP entitled Can't Take It with You, which was released in October 2007. A Christmas EP called Counting the Days was released in November 2007.

The new album was released in early January 2008 to widespread acclaim. Almost immediately afterward, however, plans for an extensive US tour were canceled following the departure of Garbinski, Peterson, and Henderson, who all went on to form Adam & Dave's Bloodline. Bassist Johnny Pisano and drummer Joe Gorelick were hired as replacements, and in late February the band embarked on a European tour to promote the album. Serge Bielanko left the band shortly after the European tour to focus on family life.

In August 2008, Dave Bielanko & Christine Smith started recording new material at 16 Ton Studios in Nashville with Pisano and Nashville-based drummer Martin Lynds, who then joined the band. Bielanko had stated his intentions of recording "a lilting beautiful folky record of acoustic guitars, tack pianos, and the stand-up bass". Bielanko & Smith toured Europe with Pisano in December 2008 as a trio before returning to 16 Ton in January 2009 to continue work on the new album.

In October, the band released the first new song from the 2009 recording sessions, the internet-only single "Put 'Em In The Graveyard".

=== Life is a Problem ===
Life is a Problem was released on June 22, 2010, through the band's own new label, Valley Farm Songs. As well as coming out on gatefold vinyl and digital download, the band took the unusual step of releasing it on cassette tape. In May, Dave Bielanko announced two new band members for their upcoming summer tour, Mark Francis Sosnoskie on bass and Bruce W. Derr on guitar.

In October, 2011 Serge Bielanko returned to the band for U.S. shows at Jammin' Java in Vienna VA, and the Elk Creek Cafe in Millheim, PA, followed by a brief Spanish tour, but soon left again to focus on family life.

=== Mountain Minstrelsy of Pennsylvania ===
In February, 2014 Marah released Mountain Minstrelsy of Pennsylvania, based on an obscure 1931 book with the same title. The book consists of a collection of song lyrics gathered in the mountains of Pennsylvania by folklorist Henry W. Shoemaker. Dave Bielanko and Christine Smith used the lyrics in Shoemaker's book as the basis for the songs on the album. Working in their studio in an old church in Millheim, Pennsylvania, the record was made on a Studer 8 track tape machine and mastered directly to a recording lathe. They also collaborated with an 8-year-old fiddle prodigy named Gus Tritsch, who plays on the album.

=== 2015 "Reunion" Shows ===
In July 2015, the band announced that they would play a reunion show of sorts on October 17 at Underground Arts in Philadelphia to celebrate the 15th anniversary of their 2000 album Kids in Philly and that they would release a re-mastered edition of that album for the first time on vinyl. The re-formed lineup included Dave and Serge Bielanko, Christine Smith, Adam Garbinski, Dave Petersen, and Mark Sosnoskie plus special guests Mike "Slo-Mo" Brenner, Jeff "Coolerman" Clarke and the Matt Cappy Horns. The band also announced two warmup gigs in advance of the Underground Arts show - one at Jammin' Java in Vienna VA on 7/23/15, and another at the Elk Creek Cafe in Milheim, PA on 10/10/15.

== Discography ==
=== Albums ===
- 1998: Let's Cut The Crap & Hook Up Later on Tonight (Black Dog - 1998 / Phidelity - released in 2004)
- 2000: Kids in Philly (E-Squared/Artemis)
- 2002: Float Away With the Friday Night Gods (E-Squared/Artemis)
- 2004: 20,000 Streets Under the Sky (US: Yep Roc/Europe: Munich)
- 2004: Kids in Amsterdam: Live on VPRO (Phidelity)
- 2005: Float Away Deconstructed (Phidelity)
- 2005: If You Didn't Laugh, You'd Cry (US: Yep Roc/Europe: Munich)
- 2005: A Christmas Kind of Town (Yep Roc)
- 2008: Angels of Destruction! (US: Yep Roc/Europe: Munich)
- 2010: Life Is a Problem (Valley Farm Songs)
- 2014: Marah Presents Mountain Minstrelsy of Pennsylvania (Valley Farm Songs)

=== EPs ===
- 2007: Can't Take It with You (Yep Roc)
- 2007: Counting the Days (Yep Roc)

=== DVDs ===
- 2006: Sooner or Later in Spain (Yep Roc)

=== Compilations ===
- 1997: Season's Greetings Philadelphia (Record Cellar)
- 1998: Camp Black Dog Presents: Rock & Roll Summer Camp '98 (Black Dog)
- 1999: No Electric Guitars (Record Cellar)
- 1999: Put Your Tongue to the Rail: The Philly Comp for Catholic Children (Songs of the Jim Caroll Band) (Genus)
