= Taking the Stage season 1 =

Taking the Stage
- Season 1
- No. of episodes: 9

Release
- Original network: MTV
- Original release: March 19, 2009 – January 17, 2010

Season chronology
- Next → Season 2

The first season of Taking the Stage premiered on March 19, 2009 and after an eight-month hiatus, the season finale aired January 17, 2010. It followed five kids who attend SCPA on the cusp of greatness. The finale aired in cahoots with the Season 2 premier.

== Cast ==
The following is a list of cast members presents in this season.

- Main Cast Member
- Secondary Cast Member

NAME	INFORMATION
Jasmine White-Killins	Senior, Dance major.
Tyler Nelson	Junior, Dance major.
Mia Carruthers	Senior, Instrumental Music major.
Shaakira Sargent	Senior, Dance major.
Malik Kitchen	Senior, Dance and Vocal Music major.
Aaron Breadon	Senior, Mia's friend/love interest.
Aubrie H.	Junior, Mia's friend.
Matthew James Dunigan	Junior, Malik's on/off boyfriend, Vocal Music Major and Musical Theatre Minor.
JJ	Senior, Tylers friend, Vocal Music Major and Musical Theatre Minor.
Jesse	Senior, Mia & Aaron's friend.

=== Main Cast Bios ===
- Tyler Nelson- A dance major and the only junior part of the season one main cast. His specialty is Hip-hop dance but with enrolling in SCPA he has to take ballet classes. He is a ladies man and early in the season he gets romantically involved with Jasmine, although then he also gets involved with Mia, creating friction with him and Jasmine and they eventually break up. He also starts a rivalry with Malik, whose crew inspired him to create his own crew, Black Rain, and do it his way since he didn't like Malik's choreography. He is given an audition for Bloc Agency along with Malik and is accepted, but his parents and ballet teacher convince him to finish high school first, with his teacher remarking "If they like you this year, they will love you next year." He returns in season two as a senior
- Mia Carruthers- A senior and vocal music major and the only white person of the show's main cast. Mia is an aspiring songwriter whose dream is to be signed to a record label before she turns eighteen. She came close to achieving that dream when the head of Jive Records who was at the talent show at the beginning of the year asked her to send him a few of her songs, but after that she was rejected by the label. She also became involved with Tyler Nelson which caused problems between her, Jasmine (Tyler's girlfriend at the time), and Aaron (Mia's friend who has a crush on her). At the end of the first season she moves in with her band which includes her brother and Aaron. She returns in season two as a new teacher for a songwriting class.
- Jasmine White-Killins- A senior and Dance major who is regarded as one of the top ballerinas in the school. She dreams of going to Juilliard for college, but is rejected and instead goes to Alvin Alley, where she is forced to choose between choosing a dance curriculum or an academic one. She is a member of Malik's dance crew 'The Definition', and is best friends with him and Shaakira. She is also romantically involved with Tyler at the start of the season. She ultimately chooses to attend Southern Methodist University in Dallas, TX.
- Malik Kitchen- A senior and Dance major who wishes to be a star on Broadway. He is openly gay and has an on/off boyfriend in Matthew. He is a rival to Tyler. His closest friends are Shaakira and Jasmine, who are also in his dance crew. Along with Tyler, Malik gets an audition for the Bloc Agency, which he is rejected by because his dancing was "too perfect". Malik also sings, and performs in a showcase of artists impressions on "Top 40" songs.
- Shaakira Sargent- A senior and dance major. She is a member of the Definition with Malik and Jasmine and their best friend. Compared to the other major cast members, Shaakira gets very little screen time and only big part in the series is when she gets a role in the school ballet.

== Episodes ==
No.	Title	Original release date	Prod. code
1	"Dance Off"	March 19, 2009	101
2	"Couples Competition"	March 26, 2009	102
3	"The Mash-Up"	April 2, 2009	103
Special Guest; Nick Lachey
4	"It's All About Trust"	April 9, 2009	104
Tyler tries to win back Jasmine's heart; while Mia shares her side of the story. The SCPA's singer-songwriters battle it out in a showcase for a local radio station.
5	"Is Love Alive?"	April 16, 2009	105
6	"A Cinderella Story"	April 23, 2009	106
7	"Something's Gotta Give"	April 30, 2009	107
Tyler and Jasmine's relationship ends when Tyler feels that he doesn't want to be in a relationship. Meanwhile, Mia is over Tyler. Aaron receives news that he can no longer go to SCPA because of his academics. Malik and Matthew break up, while Malik and Mia perform at the "Top of the Charts".
8	"The X Factor"	May 7, 2009	108
Malik and Tyler audition for Bloc Hip-hop management, while only one will be signed. Mia goes to New York City to meet Jive Records, who are interested in her, but finally she didn't obtain any positive answer. Jasmine auditions for the Ailey school of dance, and realizes she needs to choose whether to go with her academic career, or dance career. The Masquerade Dance comes up, letting Jasmine and Tyler realize their last dance is when they really need to let go. Tyler invited Mia to a date.
9	"Graduation Special"	January 17, 2010	109
Note: Last Appearances of Jasmine, Malik, and Shaakira.; Note: Aired 8 months after the actual "season finale".
