= Mike Brenner =

American musician

Mike "Slo-Mo" Brenner is an American musician based in Philadelphia. He is the veteran of many bands and has recorded tracks on over 100 CDs of both independent and major label artists.

== Career ==
Brenner first became known in Philadelphia in the late 1980s as a music writer for such publications as The Philadelphia Inquirer, Philadelphia Weekly (then called Welcomat), Tower Records' Pulse and more. He soon switched course and returned to playing music, joining local band Flight of Mavis as its second guitarist. In 1990, Brenner's own project, The Low Road, was in its infancy but grew quickly and soon forced a 'one or the other decision.' Brenner left Flight of Mavis to concentrate on The Low Road, which eventually signed a deal with Caroline Records. The band put out two discs on Caroline/Passenger: The Devil's Pocket and Fidelity and toured with Los Lobos, Ben Folds Five, Barenaked Ladies, Black 47 and others.

When the Low Road broke up in 1997, Brenner was already interested in the sound of the square-necked dobro or resonator guitar. Largely inspired by Jerry Douglas, Mike Auldridge and Josh Graves, he became quite fluent in bluegrass and country dobro styles. The first project that featured his slide playing was John Train, then a duo with Brenner and songwriter and guitarist Jon Houlon. This band remains viable today and includes drummer Mark Schreiber, bassist Steve Demarest, mandolinist Bill Fergusson and electric/steel guitarist Mark Tucker. Around this time, Brenner also played lap steel with NYC country duo Y'ALL.

Brenner played dobro on the first disc by Philadelphia band Marah, "Let's Cut The Crap and Hook Up Later Tonight," and shortly thereafter joined as a touring member of this band, primarily playing lap steel guitar. He wound up recording tracks on their lauded 2nd disc "Kids in Philly" and touring the US and Europe, including many gigs as an opening act for Steve Earle, the Jayhawks, Government Mule and more.

During his tenure with Marah, Brenner began experimenting with combining the dobro and electronica beats. His initial efforts, produced by John Wicks, led to a deal with Bong Load Records in Los Angeles, produced by Tom Rothrock (Beck, Foo Fighters, James Blunt, Richard Thompson) and Beale Dabbs. The CD, titled "Novelty", came out in 2000 under the name Slo-Mo on the Acid Blues Record label. The disc featured the talents of Attraction's drummer Pete Thomas, singer/guitarist Johnny Irion, Jenny Benford and many more.

Since then, Slo-Mo has morphed into a hip-hop hybrid, mainly due to the addition and collaboration of Mic Wrecka, a Philly rapper. The 2nd Slo-Mo disc, 2005's My Buzz Comes Back, was produced by Brenner and Edan Cohen and was a local hit and received much airplay from Philadelphia Triple A radio station WXPN. The follow-up, 2007's "Smokey Mountain" continued the evolution of the band and the songwriting partnership of Brenner and Wrecka.

Female vocals have played a large part in Slo-Mo's recordings. Past singers have included Nancy Falkow, Lauren Hart, Ty Stiklorius and current band members Susan Rosetti and Steph Hayes (of Stargazer Lily). Other members to pass through Slo-Mo's ranks (both recording and touring) have been trumpeter Matt Cappy (the Roots, Jill Scott) and Brian Christinzio (BC Camplight). The current line-up (as of May 2009) includes the aforementioned rhythm section of Schreiber and Demarest, plus percussionist Hoagy Wing, keyboardist Daryl Hirsch, Steph Hayes, Susan Rosetti, Brenner and Wrecka.

The newly renamed Slo-Mo featuring Mic Wrecka has played with India.Arie, Arrested Development, Robert Randolph, and is a crowd favorite at the Great Blue Heron Festival in Sherman, NY.

Brenner also has recorded and toured extensively with Magnolia Electric Company/Song:Ohia, projects led by songwriter Jason Molina. Brenner's work has appeared on numerous of the band's discs including those recorded by producer Steve Albini in Chicago.
