= Taking the Stage season 2 =

Taking the Stage
- Season 2
- No. of episodes: 12

Release
- Original network: MTV
- Original release: January 28 – April 15, 2010

Season chronology
- ← Previous; Season 1

The second season of Taking the Stage premiered on January 28, 2010 and concluded on April 15, 2010 with an order of 12 episodes. It continued to follow the trials and tribulations of students at SCPA. This season the series changed it format from 1 hour episodes, to a 30-minute format, despite a couple of episodes. It has been confirmed by several students from the class of 2010 that the cast of this season were not in fact real students of the school, excluding Tyler Nelson, who graduated and returned to reprise his role in season 1. MTV found them in various states and they were hired to act in a "situational reality" series. In this season, unlike last, the cast is interviewed so the viewer can hear their thoughts during the show unlike last season where the viewer had to rely on simply conversations, facial expressions, and the soundtracks.

This is the final season of the series.

== Cast ==
The following is a list of cast members presents in this season.

- Main Cast Member
- Secondary Cast Member

NAME	INFORMATION
Tyler Nelson	Senior, Dance major.
Emily Silber	Senior, Dance major.
Adam Calvert	Junior, Vocal major.
Ian Watts	Senior, Technical Theatre major.
Anna-Lisa Flinchbaugh	Junior, Dance major.
Carlton Totten	Junior, Drama major.
Emily Sones	Sophomore, Vocal major.
Holly Angel	Junior, Drama/Vocal Major. Adam's brief girlfriend. Source of the shows drama.
Mia Carruthers	Graduate, alumni of Instrumental Music department.
Aris Ray	Senior, Drama major.
Aubrie Houchens	Senior, Mia's friend.
Kayla Richardson	Senior, Dance major.
Kenneth Wright	Senior, Drama major.

=== Main Cast Bios ===
- Tyler Nelson- A senior and dance major who is continuing his education that he started last season, along with a new hip-hop class where he can do what he does best. He and Aris are still in Black Rain and he begins a relationship with Emily Silber; who caught his attention in hip-hop class. He also creates a rivalry with Carlton and is often fairly mean to him, effectively putting Carlton into the same position he was in when he was a junior and had a rivalry with Malik.
- Emily Silber- A senior who transferred from Saint Ursula Academy (an all girl Catholic school in Cincinnati) just to be able to pursue her dancing career at SCPA. She also happens to catch Tyler's interest.
- Adam Calvert - A junior and vocal music major. He was home-schooled in Tennessee for a very long time before coming here, where girls Emily Sones and Holly start to crush on him. He asks Holly out only to find out that she is cheating on her boyfriend with him and he ends it with her. His grandmother has cancer and is his inspiration. He harbours feelings for Emily Sones and we see this later on when he grows jealous of her relationship with Ian.
- Ian Watts- A senior and tech theater and drama major. He is actually a rapper and hopes to become the "first big rapper out of Cincinnati". He has a relationship with Emily Sones, which makes Adam jealous, although they are friends.
- Anna Lisa-Flinchbaugh- A junior and dance major who has scoliosis and due to a titanium screw in her back greatly limits her flexibility in her dancing. She is very attractive and tries her best to perform in order to prove to everyone that she is capable even with limitations. She is a devout Christian and begins a good friendship with Emily Sones. Carlton is always trying to catch her attention and the two grow closer; eventually forming a relationship.
- Carlton Totten-A junior and vocal, drama and dance major. In his previous school he was teased for being into the performing arts and when he comes to SCPA he gets a lot of grief from Tyler who puts Carlton in the same situation that he was in with Malik in season one.
- Emily Sones- A sophomore and vocal music major. She has a crush on Adam and writes a song about him; but after seeing him with Holly, she decides to start a relationship with Ian, making Adam jealous.
- Holly Angel - A junior and a drama/vocal major. Holly was a true SCPA student of five years prior to the airing of the show. Referred to as the "hot, sexy, party girl". Holly is the source of the shows entertaining drama. She catches Adam's eye from day one and knocks out Emily's chances of getting Adam.

== Episodes ==
^{1} Denotes a 1-hour episode.

No.	Title	Original release date
Ep. Casting	"Season 2 Audition Special"	January 16, 2010
Anna, Emily Sones, Emily Silber, Carlton, Ian and Adam join countless students as they audition for a coveted spot as a student at SCPA.
Ep.201	"New Year, New Talent ^{1}"	January 23, 2010
A back-to-school talent show gives new students a chance to team up with music and dance performances, and SCPA alumn Mia makes a tough decision about the future of her band.
Ep.202	"Testing The Waters"	February 4, 2010
Emily Sones and Adam hit a roadblock in their relationship when Adam starts seeing another girl. Meanwhile, Tyler gets closer to Emily Silber and the Singer/Songwriter Showcase reveals new sides to the students' personalities.*Note: First time the show aired as a "half hour" program.
Ep.203	"A Better Girl"	February 11, 2010
Adam comes to blows with girlfriend Holly after learning of another boyfriend, Tyler and Emily Silber become "official" and sparks fly between all SCPA-goers when Anna hosts a bonfire.
Ep.204	"Making Moves"	February 18, 2010
Carlton struggles to keep up with the moves for the Hip Hop Showcase and ramps up the flirting with Anna. Plus, Adam discovers he's too late with Emily Sones when he learns Ian's taking her out on an ice cream date.
Ep.205	"Demands Of Dance"	February 25, 2010
Tyler struggles with an injury before the dance ensemble and finds Emily Silber practicing his parts with another guy. Meanwhile, Carlton continues to work his game on a newly-single Anna.
Ep.206	"Going For 'Fame'"	March 4, 2010
The students audition for SCPA's production of 'Fame' and Adam's shocked when Holly's Spoken Word performance asks him to renew their relationship.
Ep.207	"Making Connections"	March 11, 2010
Mia opens for the Ingrid Michaelson concert, where jealousy over Emily Sones' relationship with Ian causes heartbreak for Adam. Meanwhile, Tyler lands a new opportunity after Columbus Short visits SCPA.
Ep.208	"The Big Picture"	March 18, 2010
Tyler's relationship with Emily Silber is strained when he leaves town for his movie audition in Atlanta. Meanwhile, Adam hatches a musical plan to gain the attention of Emily Sones...which leads to a confrontation with Ian.
Ep.209	"Singled Out"	March 25, 2010
When Tyler learns the outcome of his movie audition, it begins to affect his relationship with Emily Silber. Ian throws a Halloween party, where he plans a revenge rap to get back at Adam for his performance at 13th and Broadway.
Ep.210	"Competing Commitments"	April 1, 2010
When Tyler lives out his dream and flies to Atlanta to film 'Stomp the Yard 2,' he not only misses out on crucial 'Fame' rehearsals, but he leaves his relationship with Emily Silber hanging by a thread.
Ep.211	"Showtime ^{1}"	April 8, 2010
After weeks of rehearsals, the cast of 'Fame' has a successful opening night, with Carlton opening the show. And, even though Tyler missed a few rounds of rehearsals due to 'Stomp The Yard 2,' he still managed to wow the crowd with his solo. Not wanting to be tied down, Ian, confronts Emily Sones and tells her he wants to be single.
Ep.212	"Moving On ^{1}"	April 15, 2010
Anna agrees to be Carlton's girlfriend while out on their second date, and later hosts a surprise 16th birthday party for Emily Sones. As a gift, Adam serenades her during the celebration. Later, Tyler out-dances Emily Silber and Carlton in the Dance Crew Competition, where Anna gets upset over Carlton's advances...leading to their breakup. And Adam and Emily Sones share their first official date, while Tyler lands another movie audition that takes him to L.A.: Note:This is the series finale. Shortly after this episode aired, the series was announced canceled.
