= Lifted =

Lifted may refer to:

== Films ==
- Lifted (2006 film), a short film by Pixar
- Lifted (2010 film), a film directed by Lexi Alexander

== Albums ==
- Lifted (CDB album), 1997
- Lifted (Dallas Smith album), 2014
- Lifted (Israel Nash album), 2018
- Lifted or The Story Is in the Soil, Keep Your Ear to the Ground, a 2002 album by Bright Eyes

== Songs ==
- "Lifted" (Lighthouse Family song), 1995
- "Lifted", a song by Suicide Silence that appears on their 2009 album No Time to Bleed
- "Lifted" (Naughty Boy song), 2013, featuring Emeli Sandé
- "Lifted" (Dallas Smith song), 2015
- "Lifted" (CL song), 2016

== Other ==
- Lifted Research Group, an Orange County-based clothing brand
