= Mark Boyce =

Mark Boyce may refer to:

- Mark Boyce (ecologist) (born 1950), Canadian ecologist
- Mark Boyce (singer) (born 1960), Australian singer
