= Israel Nash =

American singer-songwriter

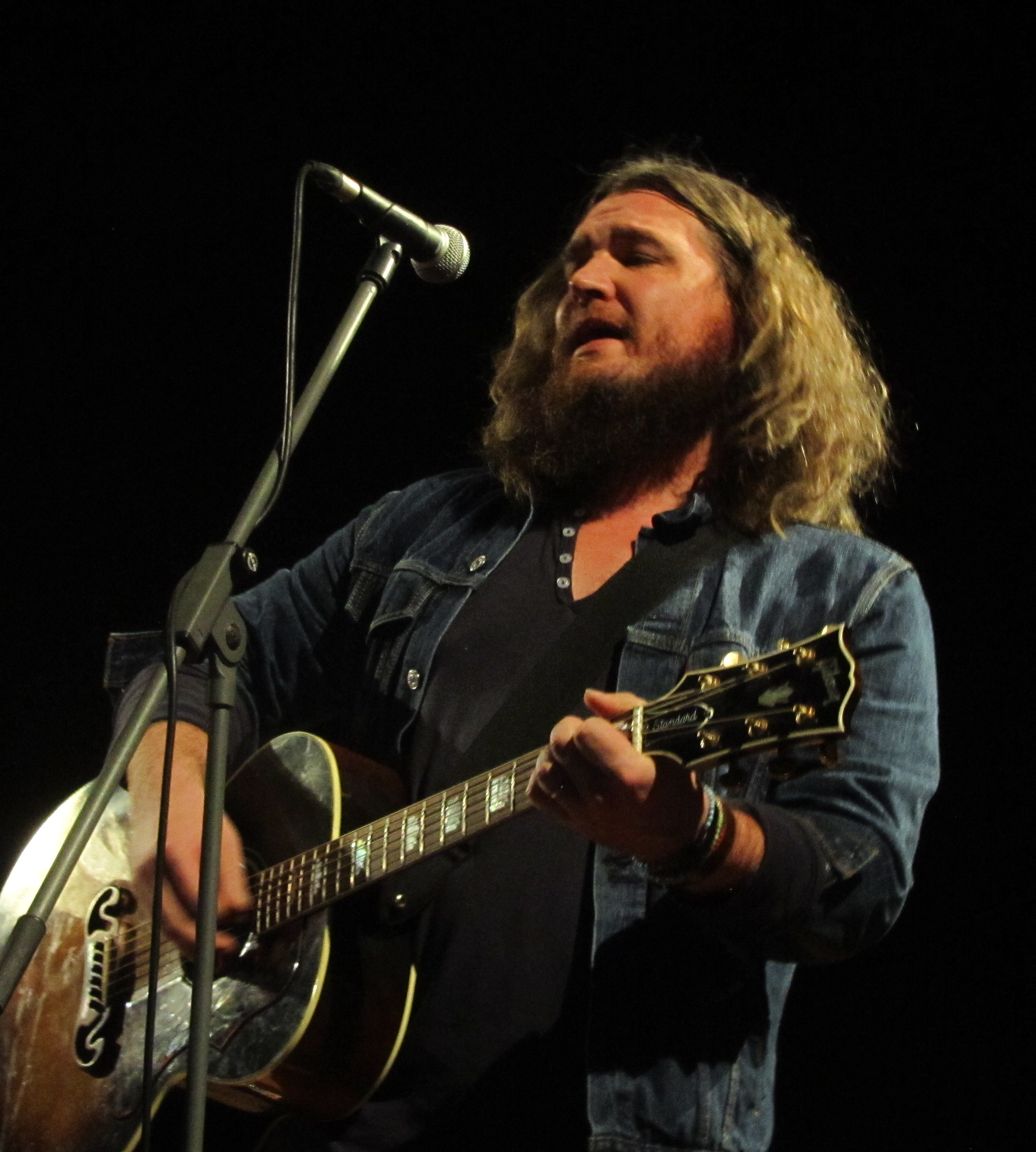
- Israel Nash, 2012

Background information
- Born: 5 January 1981 (age 45)
- Origin: Dripping Springs, Texas
- Genres: Rock, indie rock, Americana
- Years active: 2008–present
- Labels: Loose Music, Thirty Tigers
- Members: Israel Nash; Joseph McCllellan; Eric Swanson; Aaron McClellan; Josh Fleischmann
- Website: israelnash.com

Israel Nash (born January 5, 1981) is the recording and performing stage name moniker of American singer, songwriter, and guitarist Israel Nash Gripka.

== Career ==
Originally from Missouri, Nash moved to New York City in 2006. Nash performed in clubs on the Lower East Side such as The Living Room and Rockwood Music Hall. In 2009, he independently released his debut solo album, New York Town, which was recorded at The Magic Shop in New York's SoHo neighborhood. New York Town was eventually picked up by Dutch label Continental Records Services in Europe and the UK.

His second album, Barn Doors and Concrete Floors, was released on March 29, 2011. The album was recorded during the summer of 2010 on a small farm located in the Catskill Mountains in upstate New York. Nash recruited Sonic Youth's Steve Shelley to co-produce the album and play drums on all the tracks. Ted Young engineered the album. For this album, Nash drew from his circle of friends to form his backing band including Joey McClellan (Midlake, The Fieros) on lead guitar, Aaron McClellan (The Fieros) on bass guitar, and Eric Swanson on bass, mandolin, and banjo. Released by Continental Record Services, the album garnered further attention in Europe and the UK and received positive reviews in publications like The Independent. Barn Doors and Concrete Floors was also chosen as the top album of 2011 by the Euro Americana Charts. Extensive touring in Europe in support of Barn Doors helped Nash gain greater exposure.

In late 2011, Nash left New York City and moved to Dripping Springs, Texas. His third record, Rain Plans, was recorded in the summer of 2012. Rain Plans was produced by Nash and again engineered by Ted Young. The album was tracked on a Studer 16-track 2" analog tape machine intentionally avoiding the use of modern digital recording technology. Nash's house outside of Dripping Springs served as the studio and residence for the band during the recording session. The band consisted of Nash's touring lineup from the Barn Doors album cycle, including drummer Josh Fleischmann, Joey and Aaron McClellan on guitar and bass (respectively), and Eric Swanson on pedal steel. Released by the London label Loose Music on September 30, 2013, the album received generally positive reviews from the European press.

In 2014, Rain Plans was released in the US by Loose Music through Nashville based label services company Thirty Tigers. It quickly became a favorite on NPR and several non-commercial radio stations such as KEXP in Seattle, WXPN in Philadelphia, KUTX in Austin, and The Current in Minneapolis-St. Paul. In January 2015, Israel Nash was featured on a session of World Cafe. The title track was featured in the film Captain Fantastic.

Nash and his band recorded Silver Season on tape at Nash's Texas ranch in 2015 which was released October 2015 to critical acclaim. Christina Applegate named it her favorite album of the year. Classic Rock magazine considered it "even more exquisite" than Rain Plans. Q magazine highlighted its "subtly political messages", while Uncut called it "a terrific album". Mojo praised its "cosmic poetry, crunching guitars and swooning pedal steel".

On November 4, 2016, Nash and The Bright Light Social Hour released the three-song collaborative EP Neighbors. The EP was recorded between the two bands' studios near Austin, and was released digitally and as a limited edition 7" vinyl record.

While touring in 2024 to support his latest album, Ozarker, Nash suddenly canceled all the remaining shows. On March 24, 2024, Nash made his last social media post and went into isolation.

On November 25, 2025, Nash returned to social media.

== Discography ==
=== Studio albums ===
- New York Town (2009)
- Barn Doors and Concrete Floors (2011)
- Rain Plans (2013)
- Israel Nash's Silver Season (2015)
- Lifted (2018)
- Topaz (2021)
- Ozarker (2023)
- Sweetheart of the Rodeo (2026)

=== Live albums ===
- 2011 Barn Doors Spring Tour: Live in Holland (2011)
- Across the Water: Live in Europe (2020)

=== EPs ===
- Working Class Hero and Other Favorites (2011)
- From The Other Side Of The Barn (2012)
- See The Beauty That Surrounds You (2014)
- Neighbors EP with The Bright Light Social Hour (2016)
- Topaz EP (2019)
