= If You Didn't Laugh, You'd Cry =

Studio album by Marah
- Released: October 18, 2005
- Recorded: January to May 2005
- Studio: Magic Shop, New York City: 100 Metro, New York City
- Genre: Rock, Country, Folk, Punk
- Length: 41:28
- Label: Yep Roc Records
- Producer: Marah

Marah chronology
Float Away Deconstructed (2005)	If You Didn't Laugh, You'd Cry (2005)	A Christmas Kind of Town (2005)

Professional ratings
Review scores
Source	Rating
Allmusic	4.5/5 stars
Pitchfork Media	5.5/10 stars
PopMatters	7/10 stars

If You Didn't Laugh, You'd Cry is an album by Marah, released on Yep Roc Records in the United States and Munich Records in Europe on October 18, 2005.

Marah, during yet another period of personnel transition (a constant theme over the career of mercurial band leaders Dave and Serge Bielanko), recorded the majority of IYDLYC over nine studio days at The Magic Shop recording studio in New York City. Additional tracking and overdubs were recorded by bass guitarist/keyboardist/engineer Kirk Henderson at the band's project studio in Brooklyn, NY. Basic tracking for this, Marah's fifth studio release, began with departing band members Jon Wurster on drums and Mike "Slo-Mo" Brenner on dobro, bass, and electric guitar, and finished with new members Dave Petersen on drums and Adam Garbinski (both formerly of the band Squad Five-O) on electric guitar. No song went past a second take.

The resulting disc, If You Didn't Laugh, You'd Cry (IYDLYC), met with near universal critical acclaim. Stephen King, writing in Entertainment Weekly, hailed IYDLYC as the best record of 2005.

If You Didn't Laugh, You'd Cry is an apt enough title, when you consider that this is probably the best rock band in America that nobody knows. Am I being an elitist here, trying to one-up my audience? Nope. Marah is great in the scat, bop, and jive way Springsteen was great on The Wild, the Innocent & the E Street Shuffle. One listen to songs like The Closer and Fat Boy on this amazing record and I think you'll agree. These guys are either the American U2 or close enough for government work.

== Track listing ==
1. "The Closer" – 2:44
2. "The Hustle" – 3:34
3. "City of Dreams" – 2:56
4. "Fat Boy" – 2:27
5. "Sooner or Later" – 3:53
6. "Out of Tune" – 3:45
7. "Demon of White Sadness" – 3:51
8. "The Dishwasher's Dreams" – 3:56
9. "Poor People" – 4:25
10. "Walt Whitman Bridge" – 3:06
11. "The Apartment" – 3:27
12. "The Sooner or Later Interlude" (hidden track) – 3:24

== Personnel ==
- Dave Bielanko – electric and acoustic guitars, banjo, percussion, lead vocals, background vocals
- Serge Bielanko – electric and acoustic guitars, banjo, percussion, lead vocals, background vocals
- Kirk Henderson – bass guitar, piano, organ, background vocals, vibraphone, mellotron, trumpet
- Dave Petersen – drums, percussion, background vocals
- Mike Brenner – lap steel guitar, dobro, electric guitar, bass guitar
- Adam Garbinski – electric guitar
- Jon Wurster – drums, percussion
