= The Bright Light Social Hour =

Rock band from Texas

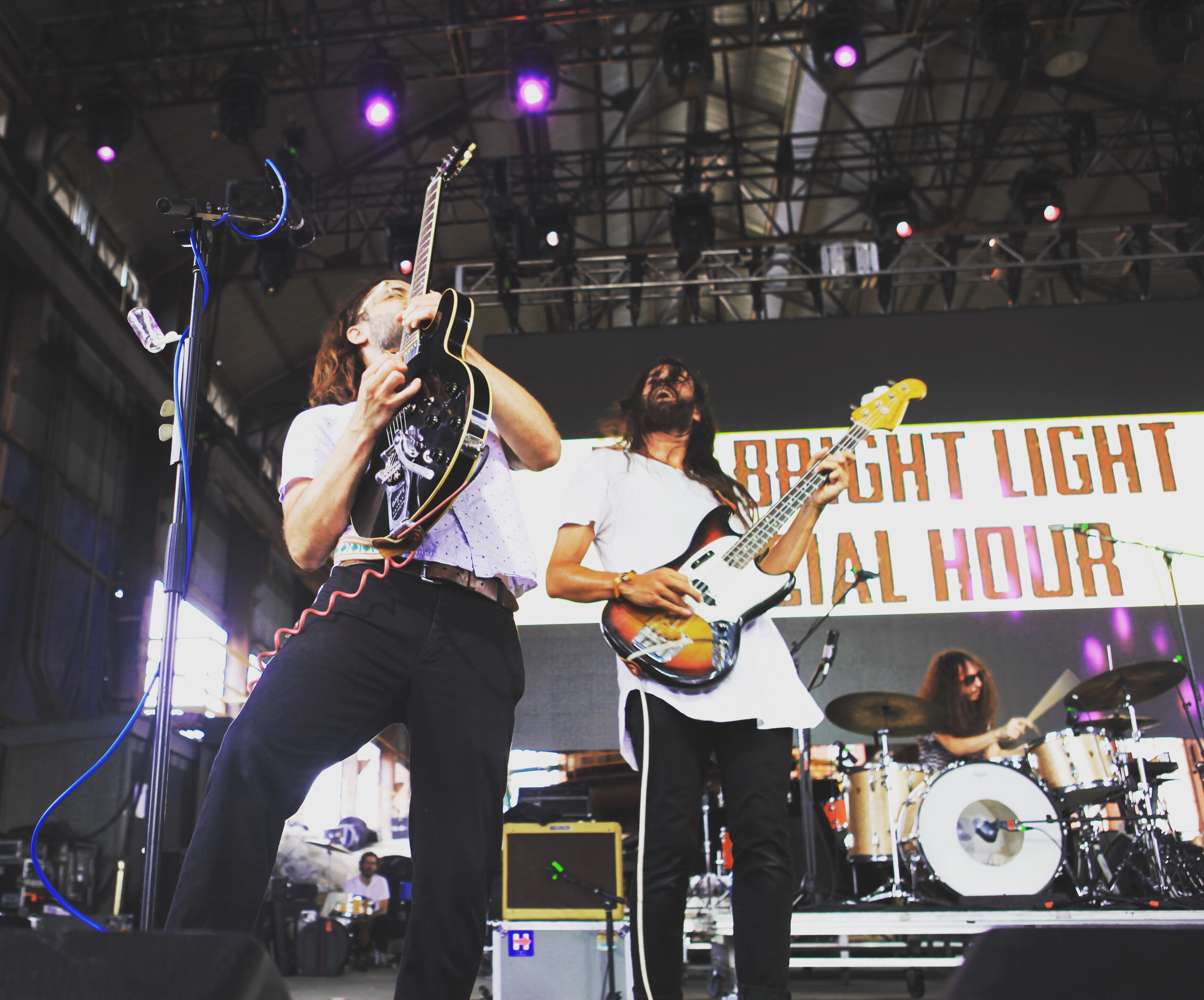
- The Bright Light Social Hour performing at Sloss Music & Arts Fest 2016 in Birmingham, Alabama

Background information
- Origin: Austin, Texas, United States
- Genres: psychedelic rock; dance-rock; neo-psychedelia; post-punk; funk; space-rock; psychedelic pop
- Years active: 2004–present
- Labels: Escondido Sound, Frenchkiss Records, Modern Outsider
- Members: Jackie O'Brien; Curtis Roush; Zac Catanzaro; Mia Carruthers; Juan Alfredo Ríos
- Past members: Edward Braillif; Joseph Mirasole; A.J. Vincent; Ryan O'Donoghue; Thomas Choate
- Website: thebrightlightsocialhour.com

The Bright Light Social Hour is an American psychedelic rock band from Austin, Texas. The band is composed of Jackie O'Brien on bass and vocals, Curtis Roush on guitar and vocals, Zac Catanzaro on drums, Mia Carruthers on keys and vocals, and Juan Alfredo Ríos on percussion.

== History ==
=== Formation and early work (2004–2010) ===
In September 2004, Southwestern University students Curtis Roush (guitar), Thomas Choate (drums) and Jackie O’Brien (vocals/keyboards), along with Ryan “Badcock” O’Donoghue (bass) began playing together as a post-hardcore art rock collective. They were often billed with area hardcore bands such as 25 Dollar Massacre, Thumbscrew and At All Cost and quickly grew a reputation for their visceral live shows. The band took a year hiatus while Roush studied audio engineering and O’Brien studied linguistics and Flamenco guitar in Madrid, during which time Choate moved away to study eco building.

In October 2006, upon O’Brien's return, the band brought in Joseph Mirasole, a drummer from a local high school drum line, via Craigslist. During this period the band recorded their first studio EP, Touches. Soon after, the band relocated to Austin where O’Brien and Roush enrolled in Master's programs at the University of Texas. They parted ways amicably with Badcock, with Jackie taking over bass duties and Roush helping with vocals.

In 2008 they released the EP Love Like Montopolis, which showcased a more delicate, downtempo post-rock sound, and brought on local singer-songwriter A.J. Vincent on keys and vocals.

=== The Bright Light Social Hour (2010–2014) ===
The band continued to grow their reputation with consistent high energy shows in southern states, their sound evolving to include elements of soul, southern rock and psychedelia. The band released their debut full-length album in late 2010, entitled The Bright Light Social Hour. The album was recorded in Austin during summer 2010 with producer Danny Reisch.

Momentum built for the band under the leadership of new manager Alex O'Brien, and in March 2011 they swept the 29th Annual Austin Music Awards during SXSW, with an unprecedented 6 awards, including Band of the Year, Album of the Year and Song of the Year (for their song "Detroit"). Subsequently, The Bright Light Social Hour began a relentless touring schedule, playing hundreds of shows across the United States, Canada and Mexico including opening for Aerosmith and appearances at Lollapalooza, Austin City Limits, Hangout, Sasquatch!, Wakarusa and Ottawa Bluesfest.

In January 2013, citing growing personal and creative differences, Vincent was replaced by keyboardist/guitarist Edward "Shreddward" Braillif, whom Mirasole had known DJing in Austin.

On June 25, 2013 Mirasole, Roush and O'Brien were in attendance at Senator Wendy Davis' famous filibuster of Texas Senate Bill 5. Inspired by the ferocity of the crowd gathered in the Capitol, they rushed to their studio and by the morning had released the song "Wendy Davis," with an accompanying video made in part with protest footage taken on the band's phones. The video was featured in MSNBC's national coverage of the event.

In May 2013 the band announced they'd begun work on their second full-length album, to be performed, produced and engineered by Roush, O'Brien and Mirasole, and mixed by Chris Coady.

=== Space Is Still the Place (2015–2018) ===
On January 19, 2015, after a severe and protracted battle with bipolar I disorder, Alex O'Brien, the band's long-time manager and Jackie's brother, committed suicide. Jackie discovered him outside the band's home studio where he resided soon after suffering a self-inflicted gunshot wound. He had resigned his position as manager months earlier, but continued to advise the band until his death.

On January 20, the band announced via The Huffington Post that their newest album, Space Is Still the Place would be released March 10, 2015 on Frenchkiss Records.

On February 17, 2015, Jay Z's Life+Times premiered the music video for their first single, "Infinite Cities", directed by bassist/singer Jackie O'Brien.

Space Is Still the Place was released on March 10 to positive reviews, described by AllMusic's Mark Deming as "an ambitious and wildly entertaining journey into the minds of the men who created it." The band celebrated the release with a sold-out performance at Stubb's Austin including a tribute to Alex featuring prominent Austin musicians Ray Wylie Hubbard, Walker Lukens, Megafauna, Migrant Kids, and members of Black Joe Lewis & the Honeybears.

Songs from Space Is Still the Place have been featured in HBO's Vice Principals, MTV's Teen Wolf, Fox's Brooklyn Nine-Nine, The CW's Riverdale, NBC's Midnight, Texas, Audience's Kingdom, USA's Shooter, Hulu's Shut Eye, Terrence Malick's 2017 film Song to Song, Ubisoft's Far Cry 5 and a Nintendo Switch commercial.

Following the release of Space Is Still the Place, TBLSH embarked on a year-long tour of the United States, Canada and Mexico, including runs supporting Dr. Dog, Edward Sharpe and the Magnetic Zeros, Dave Matthews Band, The Flaming Lips and Galactic, and appearances at Corona Capital and Shaky Knees Music Festival.

Live at Lincoln Hall, Chicago (2015)

On November 13, 2015, shortly before taking the stage at Lincoln Hall (Chicago), the band heard news of the November 2015 Paris attacks and scrambled to have their performance recorded. Soon after, the digital album, Live at Lincoln Hall, was available for download from the band's Bandcamp page in exchange for any donation to the French Red Cross.

In March 2016, TBLSH released a cover of The Beach Boys' "All I Wanna Do", which was featured on the All Along the Moontower: Austin Gets Psychedelic compilation.

On November 4, 2016, TBLSH and Israel Nash released the three-song collaborative EP Neighbors. The EP was recorded between the two bands' studios near Austin, and was released digitally and as a limited edition 7" vinyl record.

In January 2017, TBLSH were hired by executive producer Bryan Cranston to compose the theme for the Amazon Video series Sneaky Pete, entitled "Harder Out Here".

Missing Something EP (2018)

On January 20, Donald Trump's Inauguration Day, TBLSH released the Jim Eno-produced single, "Tear Down That Wall," described by the Austin-American Statesman as "a searing ode to unity." The accompanying video features Austin musicians as well as Cuban youth smiling and waving middle fingers.

On September 28, 2018 TBLSH released Missing Something, a five-song EP produced by the band and mixed by Spoon's Jim Eno, via Modern Outsider. The Austin Chronicle premiered an O'Brien-directed music video for the song "Trip With Lola." Another O'Brien-directed video featuring frogs leaping from breasts in slow motion followed for "Missing Something", winning Best Music Video at the Top Indie Film Awards and earning official selection at the Austin Music Video Festival, Berlin Music Video Awards and Erotic & Bizarre Art Film Festival in Alicante, Spain.

=== Jude Vol. I & II and lineup change (2019–2022) ===
Jude Vol. I

Jude Vol. II

On January 3, 2019 Relix announced the February 1 release of a new album, entitled Jude Vol. I and premiered the single "Lie To Me (Große Lüge)". The album was produced by Chris Coady and recorded at Sunset Sound Recorders in Hollywood.

Following an extensive North American spring tour, the band took some time off, returning to the stage in November with new drummer Zac Catanzaro of Walker Lukens.

On September 26, 2019, the 50th anniversary of The Beatles' Abbey Road, TBLSH released a cover of "Sun King".

The band returned with Jude Vol. II on August 28, 2020. Released on Roll Call Records, six of the album's eight tracks were recorded by Chris Coady in the same session as Jude Vol. I. Lead single "Enough" was recorded in late 2019 by Curtis and Jackie at their studio, Escondido Sound. Medium premiered the song and video, writing, "Brimming with buttery psychedelic aromas amid tints of polished dream-pop, “Enough” reveals not only the talent, but the brilliant innovation of The Bright Light Social Hour." The video was nominated for 4 awards at the Austin Music Video Festival, winning an honorary "best psychedelic astral orgy" award.

In 2021, the band was reported to be appearing on the podcast Storybound.

In May 2021, they released the two-song EP Enter Weed Martyr, featuring single/video "Guillotine Billionaires". Following keyboardist/guitarist Shreddward Braillif's early 2021 departure, the EP showcased a three-piece TBLSH consisting of O'Brien, Roush and Catanzaro.

In November 2021, the band issued the 11th anniversary edition of their debut album, The Bright Light Social Hour. The reissue introduced lost track "Ocean", which was cut from the original track list when mixing time ran dry, as well as a demos EP titled Sound and the Jury. The release show at Mohawk Austin marked the debut performance of new keyboardist/vocalist Mia Carruthers.

In March 2022 they released another Beatles cover/video, "I Me Mine", recorded during the COVID pandemic at the request of White Denim's James Pertralli. That same month, new percussionist Juan Alfredo Ríos of Austin bands Como Las Movies and Easy Compadre! made his debut appearance with the band at SXSW 2022.

In August 2022, TBLSH released a cover of Madonna's "La Isla Bonita" featuring Israel Nash, marking the debut recording of the new five-piece lineup. In September they released the single "The Sheriff" protesting police brutality, with a version featuring hip-hop duo Riders Against the Storm. They followed up with Smoked Out in January 2023, continuing with the heavier, industrial-influenced sound of The Sheriff, with a video protesting cannabis-related incarceration benefitting Last Prisoner Project.

In February 2023, TBLSH were featured on The Song Confessional podcast, which produced the Walker Lukens-TBLSH collaborative single "$eed".

Emergency Leisure (2023)

=== Emergency Leisure (2023–Present) ===
In March 2023, The Bright Light Social Hour shared the single/video "Not New" and announced Emergency Leisure. Earmilk described "Not New" as "a mesmerizing blend of Texas trippiness and disco-punk groove" and "a testament to the band's ability to create a tight yet bewildering journey with groove-rich drums, psychedelic synths, and a dirty dancefloor payoff that would make Nile Rodgers blush". Additional album singles "Prefecture", "Most High", "Small Celebrations" and "Lifers Only" led to Emergency Leisure's release on August 2 on the band's own Escondido Sound label. The album received high praise for the band's continually surprising evolution, with The Cosmic Clash stating, "From start to finish, Emergency Leisure delivers an experience greater than the sum of its parts. Gorgeously arranged and produced, it’s a journey worth taking again and again."

A supporting tour of the US, Canada and Mexico kicked off in Alaska, with most dates opened by Montreal's Choses Sauvages, who the band site as an inspiration for Emergency Leisure.

Several songs from the album feature music videos and studio videos produced by O'Brien's film production company, Hermano Sisters Films.

== Production ==
The Bright Light Social Hour operate as an audio production and engineering unit, recording and mixing themselves and artists such as Megafauna, Ray Wylie Hubbard, Walker Lukens, Madam Radar, Migrant Kids and Bombay the Rapper out of their Austin studio, Escondido Sound.

== Discography ==
=== Albums ===
- The Bright Light Social Hour (2010)
- Space Is Still the Place (2015)
- Jude Vol. I (2019)
- Jude Vol. II (2020)
- Emergency Leisure (2023)

=== Live albums ===
- Live at Lincoln Hall, Chicago (2015)

=== EPs ===
- Touches (2007)
- Love Like Montopolis (2008)
- Neighbors (2016) (with Israel Nash)
- Missing Something (2018)
- Enter Weed Martyr (2021)
- The Sheriff (2022)

=== Singles ===
- "Back and Forth" (2009)
- "Wendy" (2013)
- "Infinite Cities" (2015)
- "Slipstream" (2015)
- "Dreamlove" (2015)
- "Lupita" (2016) (with Israel Nash)
- "Tear Down That Wall" (2017)
- "Harder Out Here ("Sneaky Pete" Main Title Theme)" (2017)
- "Trip With Lola" (2018)
- "Lie To Me (Große Lüge)" (2019)
- "Sun King" (2019)
- "She Wanna Love You" (2019)
- "Feel U Deep" (2020)
- "Enough" (2020)
- "Ouroboros '20" (2020)
- "Guillotine Billionaires" (2021)
- "Ocean" (2021)
- "I Me Mine" (2022)
- "La Isla Bonita" (2022)
- "The Sheriff" (2022)
- "The Sheriff" with Riders Against the Storm (2022)
- "Smoked Out" (2023)
- "$eed" (with Walker Lukens) (2023)
- "Not New" (2023)
- "Prefecture" (2023)
- "Most High" (2023)
- "Small Celebrations" (2023)
- "Lifers Only" (2023)

=== Compilations ===
- All Along the Moontower: Austin Gets Psychedelic – "All I Wanna Do" (2016)

=== Music videos ===
- "Back and Forth" (2009)
- "Wendy" (2013)
- "Infinite Cities" (2015)
- "Tear Down That Wall" (2017)
- "Trip With Lola" (2018)
- "Missing Something" (2018)
- "Alternate Loving" (2018)
- "Lie To Me (Große Lüge)" (2019)
- "Sun King" (2019)
- "Feel U Deep" (2020)
- "Enough" (2020)
- "Guillotine Billionaires" (2021)
- "Ocean" (2021)
- "I Me Mine" (2022)
- "La Isla Bonita" (2022)
- "The Sheriff" (2022)
- "The Sheriff" feat. Riders Against the Storm (2022)
- "Smoked Out" (2023)
- "Not New" (2023)
- "Prefecture" (2023)
- "Most High" (2023)
- "Lifers Only" (2023)
- "Eating Out My Mind" (2024)
- "Empty Fields" (2024)

== Band members ==
- Jackie O'Brien – vocals, bass (2004–present)
- Curtis Roush – vocals, guitar (2004–present)
- Zac Catanzaro – drums (2019–present)
- Mia Carruthers — vocals, keyboards (2021—present)
- Juan Alfredo Ríos – drums (2022–present)

Former members

- Thomas Choate – drums (2004–2006)
- Ryan O'Donoghue – bass (2004–2007)
- Joseph Mirasole – drums (2006–2019)
- A.J. Vincent – keyboards, vocals (2008–2012)
- Edward Braillif – keyboards, guitar (2013–2020)

== See also ==
- List of indie rock artists
