= Broken Stigma =

American rock band

- Origin: Indian Head, Maryland, U.S.
- Genres: Rock, Alt rock, Blues rock, Southern rock, Hard rock
- Years active: 2004–present
- Label: Independent
- Members: Jimmy Love; Gary Keefer; Erich Donahue; Andy Parker
- Past members: Dwight Owens Jr, Patrick Tweed, Susie Parker
- Website: http://www.brokenstigma.com/

Broken Stigma is an American rock band from the Southern Maryland area, founded in 2004 by guitarist Jimmy Love (Ryan Thompson) and drummer Gary Keefer. Broken Stigma released their first album, Broken Glass on February 1, 2007. Since then, they have received local airplay on 97.7 The Rocket, DC101, 98.3 Star FM, and have been a staple of the Southern Maryland music scene.

== History ==
Ryan Thompson, who now plays and records under the stage name Jimmy Love, and The Madness, Gary Keefer began playing together in 2000 during their respective freshmen and junior years at Henry E. Lackey High School in Indian Head, Maryland. The time they spent as members of the school's jazz band would play a large part in the band's beginnings. It would not be until the dissolution of Ryan's first band, 3LMR with Adam Weimer, in 2001 that he would ask Gary to officially join him as a founding member in a new group.

Initial rehearsals and gigs featured remaining 3LMR bassist Adam Weimer. The initial outings of the group were billed as "That Band" and featured cover songs of artists such as Deep Purple, Cream, Jimi Hendrix, The Doors, Staind, Three Doors Down, and Metallica. Adam left the band to pursue other interests shortly after their first series of local shows. Ryan and Gary proceeded to rehearse in a church's rectory, as Gary recalls, "Playing the devil's music... it just felt weird playing Black Sabbath in there." It is during this extremely formative period that Ryan and Gary began writing original material that was eventually included on the album Broken Glass including "Way Around", "Red Lady", and "One Night Only."

== Stigma ==
Ryan's then girlfriend joined the band in 2002 as bassist. As he stated in an interview with WSQU 88.9, "This is the worst thing you can do for a band... set us back two years." This period would not all be negative, as it would allow Gary and Ryan to refine nearly an album's worth of material. The band would also settle on the name "Stigma" to perform under. The band won multiple contests in this line-up and played many shows, including an opening slot for the reunion performance of local band "Tyranny." In 2004, Ryan's relationship ended, and so did another chapter for the band.

Broken Stigma's first rehearsal was June 2, 2004, after Ryan called Pat to fill the vacancy in the band, he joined as a keyboard player. Several months later, at the band's suggestion, he would also play bass guitar, at times playing both at the same time. Ryan has stated on several occasions that the band name comes from his belief that "younger groups have a tough time getting gigs and recognition in certain scenes because some club owners think anyone under the age of 62 can only play loud, annoying music. We're going to prove otherwise."

From 2004 to 2006, the band played roughly 100 shows throughout the Washington, DC metro area while recording their debut album. Just before the iTunes release of Broken Glass, Pat left the band to pursue other musical interests. Ryan and Gary continued the band unhindered, bringing new personnel in overnight to fill the gap.

Fellow Lackey graduate Erich Donahue joined, originally on bass, but Ryan and Gary quickly decided during rehearsals that his guitar sound would complement the group much more effectively. Erich had played with Stigma as a guest once before. Ryan always held the younger guitarist in extremely high regard, calling him his "guitar soul-mate."

Veteran musician Andy Parker accepted the offer to join the group on bass, and Susie Parker came aboard as keyboardist and backing vocalist, in Feb. 2007. Susie left the group's permanent line-up Feb. 2008 due to other commitments, but continues to make guest appearances at shows and in the studio. Few live recordings of this complete line-up exist, including tracks available on the band's MySpace recorded live at Jammin' Java in 2007. Both Erich and Ryan have classified these poor recordings as "Sub-Par representations of the band's sound".

== Music ==
Broken Glass, Broken Stigma's initial release, includes songs written over the course of several different stages in each member's musical development, and their lives, and the evolution throughout the album is subtly detected.

Tracks like "Way Around" and "Fly Away" are hard rock, while "Heart Says Yes" and "Sail Away" are ballads. The album contains 11 tracks with recurring sonic themes.

It was very important to Ryan and Gary that the album flow, and were influenced by artists such as Pink Floyd who use atmospheric sounds to tie songs together seamlessly. This is most notable in the transitions between "Sail Away," "Shattered," and the hard rock album closer "One Night Only." The most popular song from Broken Glass is by far "Matter of Time," with its bouncy, singable chorus.

Live at the State Theatre captures the band at their first larger venue. Everyone was extremely honored, especially Gary and Ryan, who were very aware of the legends who had walked that stage before them. "It's staggering to walk the same stage that so many of my guitar heroes have walked..." Ryan's over-excitement and appreciation can be heard on the recordings. "I say thank you way too much on that one..." he later said in an interview.

== Live performances ==
Broken Stigma's shows are always unique, drawing on many influences and styles of music, from folk to heavy metal. They often take requests from audience members, adapting their shows to the tastes of those in attendance.

In addition to their material, Broken Stigma attempt to play whatever covers will please their audience. In one instance, "guests at the show were requesting songs by Johnny Cash, James Brown and other oldies... Those songs seemed to work for the band, because the more they saw the audience groove, the more they got into the music. Guitarist and singer Jimmy Love was lively on the stage, probably because of it. With four buttons undone on his shirt, it was undetermined whether it was because of Sunday’s heat or whether he was just really into the performance."

== Discography ==
- The Road (2009 – TBA)
- Broken Glass (February 2, 2007)
- Live at The State Theatre (Live, limited release) (June 2005)
