= Float Away Deconstructed =

Studio album by Marah
- Released: 2005
- Recorded: Various Locations
- Genre: Rock, Country
- Label: PHIdelity Records
- Producer: Marah

Marah chronology
Kids in Amsterdam: Live on VPRO (2004)	Float Away Deconstructed (2005)	If You Didn't Laugh, You'd Cry (2005)

Float Away Deconstructed is an album released by the band Marah in 2005. It consists of demos from the band's 2002 release, Float Away With the Friday Night Gods.

== Track listing ==
1. "Float Away Intro" – 0:25
2. "Float Away" – 3:01
3. "Soul" – 3:47
4. "Revolution" – 4:08
5. "People of the Underground" – 3:06
6. "Crying on an Airplane" – 3:16
7. "Leaving Intro" – 0:16
8. "Leaving" – 3:38
9. "Shame" – 4:08
10. "For All We Know We're Dreaming" – 4:37
11. "What 2 Bring" – 3:56
12. "Out in Style" – 3:58
13. "My City From Above" – 2:23
