= Epiphany in Brooklyn =

Studio album by Brenda Kahn
- Released: 1992
- Studios: Magic Shop, New York City
- Label: Chaos
- Producer: David Kahne

Brenda Kahn chronology
| Goldfish Don't Talk Back (1990) | Epiphany in Brooklyn (1992) | Anesthesia (1993) |

Epiphany in Brooklyn is singer-songwriter Brenda Kahn's second full-length album, released in 1992.

== Background ==
"I Don't Sleep, I Drink Coffee Instead," the first track on the album, was the song that helped Kahn land her major label deal.

== Critical reception ==
Professional ratings
Review scores
| Source | Rating |
|---|---|
| AllMusic | 4.5/5 stars |

Trouser Press called Epiphany in Brooklyn "an album so melodramatically oversung that Kahn could be auditioning for the Ethel Merman part in some Broadway-does-folksingers production." The Washington Post called the album "livelier and more tuneful than much neo-folk." The News & Record called it "full of spiky energy and closely observed vignettes."

Ann Powers, of The New York Times, wrote: "Her songs, many of which are featured on her new album, Epiphany in Brooklyn, focused on the small world of post-modern slackers, with the kinds of lyrics that college students copy into notebooks because they so accurately describe their confused, wishful lives."

In 2022, music critic Chuck Klosterman listed Epiphany in Brooklyn as one of his top 20 favorite 1990s albums for American Songwriter. He wrote: "There’s probably some sentimentality attached to this selection. It’s impossible for me to separate my current appreciation of the material from the experience of listening to it originally. I had an inscrutable friend who loved this record even more than I did, and she would write me long handwritten letters quoting lyrical passages from its various songs, along with interpretations of how those lyrics related to her life and our friendship."

== Track listing ==
1. "I Don't Sleep, I Drink Coffee Instead"
2. "Mojave Winters"
3. "She's in Love"
4. "Anesthesia"
5. "Mint Juleps and Needles"
6. "My Lover"
7. "Sleepwalking"
8. "Lost"
9. "The Great Divide"
10. "Madagascar"
11. "Losing Time"
12. "In Indiana"
