= Space Is Still the Place =

Studio album by The Bright Light Social Hour
- Released: March 10, 2015
- Recorded: June 2013 – January 2014
- Genre: Psychedelic rock, indie rock, synth-pop, house, blues rock
- Length: 45:28
- Label: Frenchkiss Records, MapleMusic Recordings
- Producer: The Bright Light Social Hour

The Bright Light Social Hour chronology
The Bright Light Social Hour (2010)	Space Is Still the Place (2015)	Jude Vol. I (2019)

Space Is Still the Place is the second full-length album by The Bright Light Social Hour. It was released on March 10, 2015 via Frenchkiss Records (worldwide) and MapleMusic Recordings (Canada).

== Concept ==
The band has stated the album was largely inspired by staying with fans while touring in the Southern United States, as well as by concepts of Afrofuturism and progressivism.

In an interview with The Huffington Post, O'Brien stated, "We became really interested in mixing southern aspects of music – soul, rock, blues, those sort of things – with a progressive outlook, where we got really into dance music, house music, techno, psychedelic rock. We became really interested in mixing all those sounds; something future-looking and also vibe-y and comfortable, but different all together."

The album title is inspired by Sun Ra's 1974 film Space Is the Place.

== Recording and release ==
The album was recorded between June 2013, and January 2014, at the band's home in Austin, Texas. It was mixed by the band and Chris Coady in New York, NY in May 2014.

On January 20, 2015 the band announced via The Huffington Post Space Is Still The Place would be released March 10, 2015 on Frenchkiss Records.

On February 17, 2015, Jay Z's Life+Times premiered the music video for their first single, "Infinite Cities", directed by bassist/singer Jack O'Brien.

Songs from Space Is Still the Place have been featured in HBO's Vice Principals, MTV's Teen Wolf, Fox's Brooklyn Nine-Nine, The CW's Riverdale, NBC's Midnight, Texas, Audience's Kingdom, USA's Shooter, Hulu's Shut Eye, Terrence Malick's 2017 film Song to Song, Ubisoft's Far Cry 5 and a Nintendo Switch commercial.

== Reception ==
Professional ratings
Review scores
Source	Rating
Allmusic	4/5 stars
Glide Magazine	9/10 stars
The Austin Chronicle	4/5 stars
Pop-Break	8.5/10
Vinyl Mag	5/5

Space Is Still the Place was released to critical acclaim, described by AllMusic's Mark Deming as "an ambitious and wildly entertaining journey into the minds of the men who created it" and "a smart, fearless work from a band whose inner journey is paying impressive musical dividends."

== Track listing ==
All tracks are written by Curtis Roush, Jack O'Brien and Joseph Mirasole.

No.	Title	Length
1.	"Sweet Madelene"	5:43
2.	"Slipstream"	2:56
3.	"Dreamlove"	5:05
4.	"Ghost Dance"	2:35
5.	"Sea of the Edge"	3:50
6.	"Aperture"	4:40
7.	"Ouroboros"	4:29
8.	"Infinite Cities"	4:42
9.	"The Moon"	3:15
10.	"Escape Velocity"	8:13
Total length:		45:28

== Personnel ==
The personnel of Space Is Still the Place according to the liner notes of the album's LP release:

- Jack O'Brien – bass, vocals, Roland Juno-60
- Curtis Roush – guitar, vocals, Minimoog Voyager, Roland Juno-60, Wurlitzer
- Joseph Mirasole – drums, Dave Smith Tempest, Elektron Analog Four, Minimoog Voyager

Technical personnel:

- Joseph Mirasole, Curtis Roush, Jack O'Brien - production, engineering
- Chris Coady - mixing engineer
- Greg Calbi - mastering
- Mariano Peccinetti - artwork
