= Ozarker =

Studio album by Israel Nash
- Released: October 20, 2023
- Genre: Americana
- Length: 45:22
- Label: Desert Folklore; Soundly
- Producer: Israel Nash; Kevin Ratterman

Israel Nash chronology
Topaz (2021)	Ozarker (2023)

Ozarker is an album by American musician Israel Nash, released on October 20, 2023, through Desert Folklore and Soundly Music. Nash recorded the album in a home studio and worked with its co-producer Kevin Ratterman to record overdubs in Ratterman's Los Angeles studio. It received acclaim from critics and charted in Scotland.

== Critical reception ==
Professional ratings
Aggregate scores
Source	Rating
Metacritic	88/100
Review scores
Source	Rating
American Songwriter	4/5 stars
Mojo	4/5 stars
Uncut	9/10

Ozarker received a score of 88 out of 100 on review aggregator Metacritic based on five critics' reviews, indicating "universal acclaim". Mojo described the album as "both sentimental and hard-nosed, nostalgic about a past without ignoring the modern world's gritty reality", while Uncut called it "an album that unfurls like a flag on a battlefield, glorious, tattered, defiant, full of big choruses, vaulting harmonies, a brazenly windswept sound. The guitars couldn't be louder, bolder, more heroically deployed".

American Songwriter's Hal Horowitz summarized that "the melodies take flight, soaring as guitars strum, and drums pound, and Nash unleashes ten widescreen tales resounding with melancholy intensity and an idiosyncratic style best described as uncompromising". John Moore of Glide Magazine felt that Ozarker "has a timelessness to it, blending these classic [roots and heartland rock] influences with his now trademark Americana/folk laced with elements of psychedelic" and that it "manages to update a sound that resonates both comfortably and refreshing at the same time".

== Track listing ==
Ozarker track listing
No.	Title	Length
1.	"Can't Stop"	4:19
2.	"Roman Candle"	4:02
3.	"Ozarker"	4:36
4.	"Pieces"	4:52
5.	"Going Back"	5:16
6.	"Firedance"	4:38
7.	"Lost in America"	4:49
8.	"Midnight Hour"	4:09
9.	"Travel On"	3:56
10.	"Shadowland"	4:45
Total length:		45:22

== Charts ==
Chart performance for Ozarker
Chart (2023)	Peak position
Scottish Albums (OCC)	56
UK Americana Albums (OCC)	5
UK Independent Albums (OCC)	27
