= The Three 4 Tens =

American garage rock band

- Origin: Philadelphia, Pennsylvania
- Genres: psychedelic rock, garage rock, indie rock
- Years active: 1995–2001, 2003–2004, 2007–2009
- Labels: Lounge Records, File 13 Records, Rainbow Quartz Records
- Members: Joe Tagg; Jamie Mahon; Brian McNamara; Mike Kiker; Jeff Castner
- Past members: Jon Kois; Scott Rodgers; Mike Ambs; Joe Candidi; Dave Reis

The Three 4 Tens are an American garage rock band, based in Philadelphia, Pennsylvania, United States.

== History ==
The Three 4 Tens formed in 1995 by bassist Jamie Mahon, guitarist Joe Tagg, guitarist Brian McNamara and drummer Jon Kois. They opened up for The Who on November 17, 1996, when the Quadrophenia tour hit Philadelphia.

They have recorded one EP and three albums, starting in 1997 with Throw-Back-Move EP for the now-defunct Lounge Records. Their next release, the vinyl-only, non-album single "Magic Trip"/"Everyone's Girl" followed in 1998. Another non-album track, "I Feel Fine", appeared on the 1999 compilation Sounds From Psychedelphia. Their next album Change Is On Its Way followed in 2000. After Lounge folded, the band first self-released the album, but it was soon picked up and released by File 13 Records, and finally licensed and re-released in Europe by Rainbow Quartz. They released two more records on Rainbow Quartz, 2003's Taking Northern Liberties and 2007's Down The Way.

The group briefly disbanded in late 2001 when Mahon and Kois left to join Marah. They participated in recording the album Float Away with the Friday Night Gods and toured with the band in 2002. However, despite being produced by Owen Morris (Oasis, The Verve), and featuring an appearance by Bruce Springsteen on the title track. Mahon & Kois soon left the band. Mahon returned to the Three 4 Tens, however Kois opted to not return. He was replaced by Mike Ambs (formerly of Burning Brides). McNamara first left the band in 2000, and was replaced by guitarist–keyboardist Scott Rodgers (also formerly of Mondo Topless), but rejoined in 2003 after Rodgers left to rejoin Mondo Topless. McNamara soon left again after finishing Taking Northern Liberties, and moved to New York City, where he formed the group Himalaya. The Three 4 Tens disbanded again in 2004, at which point Mahon joined Asteroid No. 4. The band reconvened in 2007 to record Down The Way as a three-piece with Mahon, Tagg and Ambs. The band soon added guitarist Joe Candidi for the accompanying live shows.

In December 2008, after nearly 6 months of inactivity, the band performed at a benefit concert in Wilmington, Delaware with the lineup of Tagg, Mahon, Ambs, and newcomer Mike Kiker on guitar and keyboards. After that show, Tagg and Ambs quit the band. Mahon soldiered on as Three 4 Tens with Kiker and former House of Fire bassist Dave Reis, whilst going through a revolving door of drummers, including Adam Weaver of Asteroid No. 4. Reis soon amicably parted ways with The Three 4 Tens, to continue fronting his own group The Improbables. Deciding to carry on without a bass player, Mahon and Kiker soon found a permanent drummer in Jeff Castner. It was when Castner joined the group that they retired the name Three 4 Tens and began performing as St. James & The Apostles. In the meantime, Joe Tagg started the group, Soloram, with Pete Rydberg of Beretta76 on lead guitar, Shawn Kilroy on bass, and Jay Laughlin of Like A Fox on drums. They released their album Love and the Sweet Divine, on Rainbow Quartz in October 2010. They disbanded in March 2011.

== Discography ==
- Throw-Back-Move EP (1997)
- Sounds from Psychedelphia compilation (1999) (one song)
- Change Is On Its Way (2000)
- Taking Northern Liberties (2003)
- Down The Way (2007)

== Current members ==
- Joe Tagg - guitar, vocals (1995–2001, 2003–2004, 2006–2008, 2011–present)
- Jamie Mahon - bass guitar, vocals (1995–2001, 2003–2004, 2006–2010, 2011–present)
- Brian McNamara - guitar, vocals (1995–2000, 2003–2004, 2011–present)
- Mike Kiker - guitar, keyboards, percussion, vocals (2008–2010, 2011–present)
- Jeff Castner - drums, percussion, vocals (2011–present)

== Former members ==
- Jon Kois - drums, percussion (1995–2001)
- Scott Rodgers - guitar, keys, vocals (2000–2002)
- Mike Ambs - drums, percussion (2003–2008)
- Joe Candidi - guitar (2007–2008)
- Dave Reis - bass guitar, guitar, vocals (2009–2010)
