= The Black and White Years =

American indie art rock band

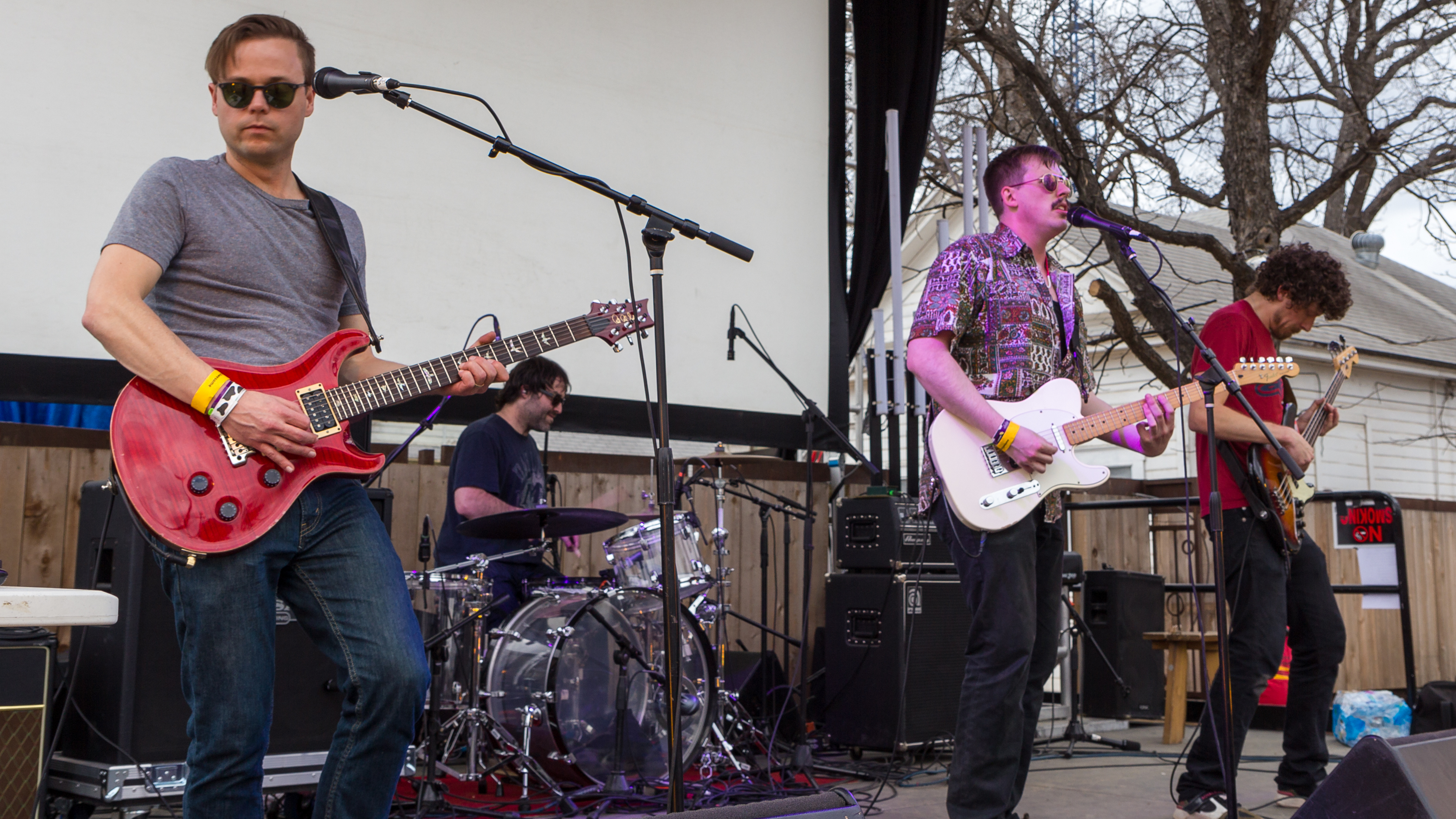
- The Black and White Years performing at SXSW in 2014

Background information
- Origin: Austin, Texas, United States
- Genres: Indie rock, new wave, art rock
- Years active: 2006–present
- Label: Brando Records (2007-2009)(US) Modern Outsider (2012-present)(US)
- Members: John Aldridge; Scott Butler; Billy Potts; Landon Thompson
- Website: Official website

The Black and White Years are an indie art rock band based in Austin, Texas. Formed in 2006, the band consists of Scott Butler, Landon Thompson and John Aldridge. Scott, Landon, and John met while attending Belmont University in Nashville, Tennessee. Billy Potts joined the band in January 2008 after their debut album had already been recorded.

The band was discovered at SXSW in 2007 by Talking Heads and Modern Lovers member, Jerry Harrison. Harrison offered to produce the band's debut LP at his personal studio in Sausalito, CA and it was released in 2008. Since the band played to sequenced drum tracks at that time, Harrison recruited Steve Ferrone to play live drums on the recordings. Since then, they've played festivals such as CMJ Music Festival, Fun Fun Fun Fest, Austin City Limits Music Festival, MIDEM, Wireless Festival. The band's song, “Power to Change,” has received a fair amount of national attention via modern rock and college stations. "Power to Change" was awarded Song of the Year at the 2009 Austin Music Awards. The band received a total of five honors including Best New Band, Best Bassist and Best Rock Band.

They released the follow-up to their Jerry Harrison (Talking Heads and Modern Lovers) produced debut on November 16, 2010. Also, in 2010 their song "To Modern Science" was used in a notable hoax featuring a fake commercial for the next generation of Apple's iPhone; the fake ad accumulated close to a million views across the internet.

On January 21, 2014, the band released their first new album since 2010 on Modern Outsider Records. The album was produced by Danny Reisch at Good Danny's in Austin, Texas. The first single, titled "Just Like Old Times," was premiered on February 25, 2013 by the influential music blog YVYNYL and features the vocals of Adrienne Butler, wife of singer-songwriter Scott Butler. The second single, titled "Little One", premiered as a free download via Magnet (magazine).

Rolling Stone premiered the title track from Strange Figurines on November 25, 2013.

== Members ==
- Scott Butler - vocals, guitars, keys, words
- Landon Thompson - guitars, keys, vocals
- John Aldridge - bass, brass
- Billy Potts - drums

== Discography ==
Albums and EPs

- Arthur #1 (CD/EP, 2019) Scott J. Butler
- Strange Figurines (CD/LP, 2014) Modern Outsider Records
- Patterns LP (CD, 2010) The Black and White Years, LLC
- Nursery Myths EP (CD, 2009) The Black and White Years, LLC
- The Black And White Years LP (CD, 2008) Brando
- Real! In Color! EP (CD-R, 2006) self-released

Singles

- "Best Friend" (2019) Scott J. Butler
- "Soon" (2019) Scott J. Butler
- "Just Like Old Times" (2013) Modern Outsider Records
- "Up!" (2010) The Black and White Years, LLC
- "Power to Change" (2008) Brando - No. 7 on Austin's KROX-FM, No. 1 on Albany's WEQX, No. 90 on the national Mediabase Alternative charts.

== Press reviews ==
- Republic of Austin
- XL Entertainment cover story
- Austin Music and Entertainment cover story
- Austin Sound interview
- The Austin Chronicle
