= Taking the Stage =

- Created by: Nick Lachey
- Opening theme: "Whatever It Takes" by Leona Lewis
- Country of origin: United States
- No. of seasons: 2

Production
- Running time: 42 mins. (season 1); 22 min. (season 2)

Original release
- Network: MTV
- Release: March 19, 2009 – April 15, 2010

Taking the Stage is a musical reality show set at the School for Creative and Performing Arts in Cincinnati, Ohio. It is produced by Nick Lachey, a SCPA alumnus, for MTV. The first season chronicled the lives of five high school students and their friends as they train for careers in the arts. The 2nd season aired from January to April 2010 on Thursday nights on MTV at 11 pm.

MTV canceled the show in May 2010.

== Starring ==
This is the Main Cast for all seasons according to MTV. For a full list of current and former cast members of Taking The Stage, see Seasons

- Main Cast Member

Name	Info	Season(s) Featured
Tyler Nelson	Graduate, alumni of Dance department.	Seasons 1 + 2
Mia Carruthers	Graduate, alumni of Instrumental Music department.	Seasons 1 + 2
Aaron Breadon	non-graduate, multi-instrumentalist Jazz major.	Seasons 1 + 2
Adam Calvert	Graduate, (transfer) Vocal major.	Season 2
Carlton Totten	Graduate, (transfer) Drama major.	Season 2
Ian Watts	Graduate, (transfer) alumni of Technical Theater department.	Season 2
Anna Flinchbaugh	non-graduate (transfer), Dance major.	Season 2
Holly Angel	Graduate, Drama Major .	Season 2
Emily Silber	Graduate, (transfer) alumni of Dance department.	Season 2
Emily Sones	non-graduate (transfer), "Drama" major.	Season 2
Jasmine White-Killins	Graduate, alumni of Dance department.	Season 1
Shaakira Sargent	Graduate, alumni of Dance department.	Season 1
Malik Kitchen	Graduate, alumni of Dance and Vocal Music departments.	Season 1

== Seasons ==
For full cast descriptions, synopsis', episode guides, and more see below.

- Taking The Stage (season 1)
- Taking The Stage (season 2)
