= Marah Presents Mountain Minstrelsy of Pennsylvania =

Studio album by Marah
- Released: 2014
- Recorded: Millheim, Pennsylvania
- Genre: Rock, folk
- Label: Valley Farm Songs
- Producer: Marah

Marah chronology
Life Is a Problem (2010)	Marah Presents Mountain Minstrelsy of Pennsylvania (2014)

Professional ratings
Review scores
Source	Rating
PopMatters	(8/10)
No Depression	(9/10)

Marah Presents Mountain Minstrelsy of Pennsylvania is an album by Marah, released in 2014.

== Track listing ==
1. Falling of the Pine
2. A Melody of Rain
3. An Old Timer's Plaint
4. Harry Bell
5. Luliana
6. Sing!, Oh Muse of the Mountain
7. Ten Cents at the Gate
8. Mountain Minstrelsy
9. Rattlesnake
10. The Old Riverman's Regret
11. Mother, Dad & Joe

== Personnel ==
- David Bielanko (Guitar, Banjo, Vocals, Harmonica, Dulcimer)
- Christine Smith (Piano, Vocals, Estey Pump Organ, Accordion, Barbershop Quartet and Tuba Arrangements)
- Kai Schafft (Banjo, Tenor Guitar)
- Jimmy James Baughman (Giant Stand Up Bass)
- Chris Rattie (Drums, Guitar, Vocal Harmonies)
- Gus Tritsch(Fiddle, Banjo, Vocals)
