= Angels of Destruction! =

Angels of Destruction

Studio album by Marah
- Released: 2008
- Recorded: Nashville, Tennessee
- Genre: Country rock
- Label: YepRoc
- Producer: Marah

Marah chronology
Counting the Days (EP) (2007)	Angels of Destruction (2008)	Life Is a Problem (2010)

Professional ratings
Review scores
Source	Rating
AllMusic	4/5 stars
Pitchfork	6.9/10

Angels of Destruction! is an album by the band Marah. It was released by Yep Roc Records on January 8, 2008.

== Track listing ==
1. Coughing Up Blood
2. Old Time Tickin' Away
3. Angels on a Passing Train
4. Wild West Love Song
5. Blue But Cool
6. Jesus in the Temple
7. Santos de Madera
8. Songbirds
9. Angels of Destruction
10. Can't Take it With You
11. Wilderness (contains a hidden track, Tippecanoe County Correctional Theme Park Blues)

== Personnel ==
- Dave Bielanko – vocals, guitar, banjo
- Serge Bielanko – guitar, vocals, harmonica
- Kirk Henderson – bass
- Dave Petersen – drums, vocals
- Adam Garbinsky – guitar
- Christine Smith – keyboards, vocals
