= Black Pistol Fire =

Austin-based rock duo

- Origin: Toronto, Ontario, Canada
- Genres: Rock and Roll, garage punk, Southern rock, punk blues
- Years active: 2011–present
- Labels: Rifle Bird Music, Modern Outsider
- Members: Kevin McKeown; Eric Owen
- Website: blackpistolfire.com

Black Pistol Fire is a Canadian-born, Austin-based rock duo. The group consists of Kevin McKeown (guitar/lead vocals) and Eric Owen (drums). Their sound is a mix of classic southern rock and garage punk.

== History ==
=== Early years ===
Kevin McKeown and Eric Owen met in kindergarten at a North Toronto elementary school. They started playing Rock and Roll together in high school.

=== Deadbeat Graffiti ===
In 2017, Consequence of Sound named them best early-day wake up call at Riot Fest 2017 and selected them as the best performance at Voodoo Fest 2017.

They achieved breakout success in 2018 with "Lost Cause" reaching number one and "Bully" reaching number five in Canada rock airplay.

== Discography ==
=== Studio albums ===
- 2011 - Black Pistol Fire - self-released
- 2012 - Big Beat '59 - Rifle Bird Records
- 2014 - Hush Or Howl - Modern Outsider
- 2016 - Don't Wake the Riot - Modern Outsider
- 2017 - Deadbeat Graffiti - Rifle Bird Records
- 2021 - Look Alive - Black Hill Records
- 2026 - Flagrant Act of Bliss - Rifle Bird Records

=== EPs ===
- 2012 - Shut-Up!

=== Singles ===
- 2015 - Damaged Goods/Mama’s Gun
- 2019 - Level
- 2019 - Black Halo
- 2019 - Temper Temper/So Real
- 2019 - Pick Your Poison
- 2019 - Well Wasted
- 2020 - Hope in Hell
- 2021 - Look Alive (No. 32 Billboard Alternative Airplay)
