= Matt Molchany =

Matt Molchany (born July 3, 1980) is an American musician, audio engineer, and owner of Shards Recording Studio in Bethlehem, Pennsylvania. He is a member of indie rock band VoirVoir; past bands include Wheelie and Gertie Fox. After playing and touring as a musician, Molchany opened Silent Sound Studios in Allentown, PA and in 2017 founded Shards Recording Studio as a "creative sanctuary" in Bethlehem, PA. VoirVoir continues to perform, opening for bands such as The Flaming Lips, and touring with Slingshot Dakota. In 2016 VoirVoir was a featured band on "bandcamp daily," where their album was favorably described as "confident and fully realized, with the five-piece band touching on and tearing through classic melodic indie rock."

As engineer, producer, and guest performer, Molchany has worked with a wide variety of musicians, including heavy metal bands, noise rock, and children's music, most notably with Brenda Kahn on her album "Rocket To The Moon". He is also active as a show promoter and radio DJ, founding the Tape Swap Radio series of concerts with WDIY Radio's Shamus McGroggan. Tape Swap concerts feature local, regional, and national performers in venues such as coffee houses, libraries, and rooftops.
