= Moving Panoramas =

- Origin: Austin, Texas, United States
- Genres: Indie rock, shoegaze, dream pop
- Years active: 2013–present
- Label: Modern Outsider
- Members: Leslie Sisson; Cara Tillman; Phil McJunkins; Chris Nine; Marc Fort; Nick Pellicciotto
- Past members: Rozie Castoe; Karen Skloss; Jolie Flink; Jordan Rivell; Jody Suarez; Laura Colwell
- Website: movingpanoramas.com

Moving Panoramas are an American indie rock band from Austin, Texas. They released their first two albums on Modern Outsider records and a third is in the works.

Moving Panoramas founder, songwriter, guitarist, and front woman Leslie Sisson was a member of The Wooden Birds, Matt Pond PA, Western Keys, Tanworth-in-Arden, Aero Wave, Black Lipstick, Black Forest Fire, and toured as crew for bands such as Vampire Weekend, Trail of Dead, and Sons and Daughters.

She formed Moving Panoramas in the wake of personal trauma. On December 4th, 2011, Sisson and her boyfriend were abducted from her house the middle of the night by a man running from the cops who broke in during a home invasion through a window a/c unit. The assailant forced the couple at gunpoint to take PCP while he robbed, terrorized, and kidnapped them. The couple eventually escaped at a gas station when they stopped for gas and Sisson was able to break free and flee the vehicle while the kidnapper had her boyfriend go inside the station to pay.

Following the incident, Sisson reported experiencing post-traumatic stress disorder, depression, and anxiety. This was complicated by other events during the weeks that followed. A close friend and collaborator, Esme Barrera, who was a guest performer on Sisson’s solo record in 2011, was murdered during a different, unrelated home invasion on New Year’s Day, just a few weeks after Sisson’s home invasion. A week later, a troubled former roommate stalked and threatened her life. Then she got a call from the authorities learning her assailant killed a man and his teenage daughter during a home invasion in Texas City a few weeks prior to her kidnapping. This resulted in years of compounded grief, trauma, and even a bit of Stockholm syndrome.

Over the next year, Sisson turned to songwriting as a healing outlet, while teaching music and mentoring a talented multi-instrumentalist student, Rozie Castoe. She formed Moving Panoramas in 2013 with Castoe, playing their first show as a duo at Northern-Southern art gallery in Austin on January 4, 2014. The two initially worked on songs together in Sisson’s apartment in Williamsburg, Brooklyn, NY. The band was originally intended to be a New York trio with drummer Jason Hammons, a former bandmate on Sisson’s solo album, Aero Wave, Tanworth in Arden, and Hammons’ former band Pavo. Years later the three would play together again in NY.

Moving Panoramas’ debut show as a full band was on Valentine’s Day of 2014 opening for Gardens and Villa at Red 7 in Austin, with Karen Skloss replacing Hammons on drums. Sisson and Skloss were former bandmates in Black Forest Fire and met in film school at UT Austin over a decade before.

The cathartic songs inspired by Sisson’s trauma would appear on Moving Panoramas' debut dream gaze album, One, released on October 2nd, 2015. That same year, Moving Panoramas performed in the FFF Nites series at Austin's Fun Fun Fun Fest opening for Future Islands and Alvvays.

In 2016, the trio toured the US and Canada, with Sisson’s service Chihuahua, Hazy, riding shotgun the whole way. Skloss was unable to tour at the last minute, so Castoe moved to drums while Ryan Fitzgibbon and Jolie Flink tag teamed on bass for the east and west coast tours. A significant portion of their west coast leg was opening for Nada Surf. Frontman Matthew Caws of Nada Surf would later contribute guest vocals on the second Moving Panoramas record for the final track “In Tune” while doubling Sisson’s voice through the whole song, closing out the album.

In 2017, their cover of Tom Petty’s American Girl was released on the All ATX compilation series Low Down Violet Crown. The band backed up Daniel Johnston in 2018 at the inaugural Hi, How Are You Day for his final performance before he passed away.

Over the course of 2018, the band recorded a second album with an expanded lineup and sound. Skloss was replaced on drums by Jody Suarez and Jordan Rivell took over on bass. Castoe would come and go on second guitar and bass, and the addition of Phil McJunkins on pedal steel led to a more boot gaze sound. The album, In Two, was released on February 22, 2019. That same year, Moving Panoramas performed at South by Southwest. Days before SXSW, Sisson got a call from the prosecuter learning that her captor eventually pled guilty to avoid capital punishment and was sentenced to double life without parole or appeal, which was days before Sisson was set to testify.

In February of 2020, Sisson traveled to Asia with Austin’s ATX6 music ambassador program. The program featured six Austin songwriters who backed each other up rotating sets playing each others music. They played at the Jai Thep music festival in Chiang Mai, Thailand, and visited Bangkok and Tokyo, Japan, along the way. When they left the states, there was chatter about a SARS virus outbreak in Asia. When they returned home, COVID-19 was in the United States. They got back just in time. Their next leg was supposed to be in England in March of 2020 to tour and record, but the trip was cancelled due to the pandemic lockdowns, and the ATX6 program subsequently ended.

Moving Panoramas’ music has been licensed in film and television placements such as the Texas Chainsaw Massacre sequel, Good Trouble, Get Shorty, Almost Family, Catfish, You’re the Worst, King of the Road, Here We Are, The Honor Farm, SLASH, and the band appeared in an episode of Teen Mom. Leslie also appeared in The Honor Farm as the lead’s body double.

While working on their third album in 2024, Sisson was diagnosed with breast cancer. The band recorded half of the tracks before she began treatment and they are currently finishing up the last half of the record. The lineup features Leslie Sisson on guitar/vocals, Cara Tillman on keys/harmonies, Phil McJunkins on pedal steel/harmonies, Chris Nine on second guitar/harmonies, Marc Fort on bass, and Nick Pellicciotto on drums. Their former label Modern Outsider dissolved in 2025, so the band is in search of a new home for the third album, Rule of Three.

== Discography ==
- One (Modern Outsider, 2015)
- In Two (Modern Outsider, 2019)
