= Destination Anywhere (Brenda Kahn album) =

Studio album by Brenda Kahn
- Released: 1996
- Recorded: 1994
- Label: Shanachie
- Producer: Tim Patalan

Brenda Kahn chronology
King of Cairo (1994)	Destination Anywhere (1996)	Outside the Beauty (1997)

Destination Anywhere is an album by the American musician Brenda Kahn, released in 1996. The album was set for an early 1995 ship date, but Kahn was dropped from Chaos/Columbia Records two weeks prior to its scheduled release. "Reconcile" was the intended first single. Kahn supported the album with a North American tour.

== Production ==
Destination Anywhere was produced by Tim Patalan. Kahn started recording the album at the end of 1994; she decided to abandon the folk direction of her previous album in favor of a full band sound. Due to record label restructuring, Destination Anywhere was not licensed to Shanachie Records until 1996, with additional recording in Detroit. Jeff Buckley played guitar and sang on "Faith Salons"; the demo, cowritten by the pair, was recorded with Kahn in a Brooklyn loft.

== Critical reception ==
Professional ratings
Review scores
Source	Rating
AllMusic	4.5/5 stars
MusicHound Rock: The Essential Album Guide	3/5 stars
The Republican	3/5 stars

The Wisconsin State Journal wrote that "great songs like 'Spoon' allow Kahn to rock out like a less melodramatic Concrete Blonde, but the album suffers when Kahn indulges her tendency toward heavy-handed poetry." The Republican determined that, "at times a thrashing punk rocker and at other times an enticing beat poet, Brenda Kahn's a pretty complicated character, somewhat reminiscent of Patti Smith." The Chicago Sun-Times stated: "Kahn's gritty rock songs inhabit a world of desperation and disillusion. But there also is salvation in each story."

The Columbus Dispatch opined that "Destination Anywhere sounded so much like Patti Smith's Horses that we were pining for the original... After a blazing start, Kahn's images weren't as compelling as Smith's, yet were still worth hearing." The SouthtownStar concluded that "Kahn sounds a bit rougher, more blue collar bar performer than vegetarian restaurant folkie." The Austin Chronicle noted that "Kahn discovered the rare middle ground between singer-songwriter fare and punk aesthetics."

AllMusic wrote: "The bitter tone of the album might not settle well with some listeners, but the steady intensity of the music and Brenda Kahn's great vocal delivery make this album a minor masterpiece."

== Track listing ==
No.	Title	Length
1.	"Reconcile"
2.	"Terrorist"
3.	"Lie"
4.	"Spoon"
5.	"Faith Salons"
6.	"Yellow Sun"
7.	"Too Far Gone"
8.	"Night"
9.	"No Cure"
10.	"Omaha"
