= Life Is a Problem =

Life is a Problem

Studio album by Marah
- Released: 2010
- Recorded: Valley Farm, PA
- Genre: Rock, Folk
- Label: Valley Farm Songs
- Producer: Marah

Marah chronology
Angels of Destruction (2008)	Life is a Problem (2010)	Marah Presents Mountain Minstrelsy of Pennsylvania (2014)

Professional ratings
Review scores
Source	Rating
PopMatters	(8/10)

Life is a Problem is an album by Marah, released in 2010.

== Track listing ==
1. Muskie Moon
2. Valley Farm Song
3. Within the Spirit Sagging
4. Life Is a Problem
5. High Water
6. Put Em In the Graveyard
7. ...(Keep Going)
8. Tramp Art
9. Together Not Together
10. Bright Morning Stars

== Personnel ==
- David Bielanko (Guitar, Banjo, Vocals, Harmonica, Percussion, Bass, Piano, Organ Pedals, Ukulele)
- Christine Smith (BV's, Piano, Organs, Synth, Vocals, Drums, Percussion, Accordion, Fiddle, Xylophone)
- Johnny Pisano (Electric and Upright Bass)
- Martin Lynds (Drums & Percussion)
- Serge Bielanko (Vocals)
- Jeff Coolerman Clarke (Bagpipes)
- Donnie Pizza Sauce (Acoustic Guitar)
- Mike Esser (Marching Band Drum)
- Dr. George Koch (Field Recording Vocal)
- Fury & Mud (Goat Impressions)
