= Modern Outsider =

Management company and independent record label

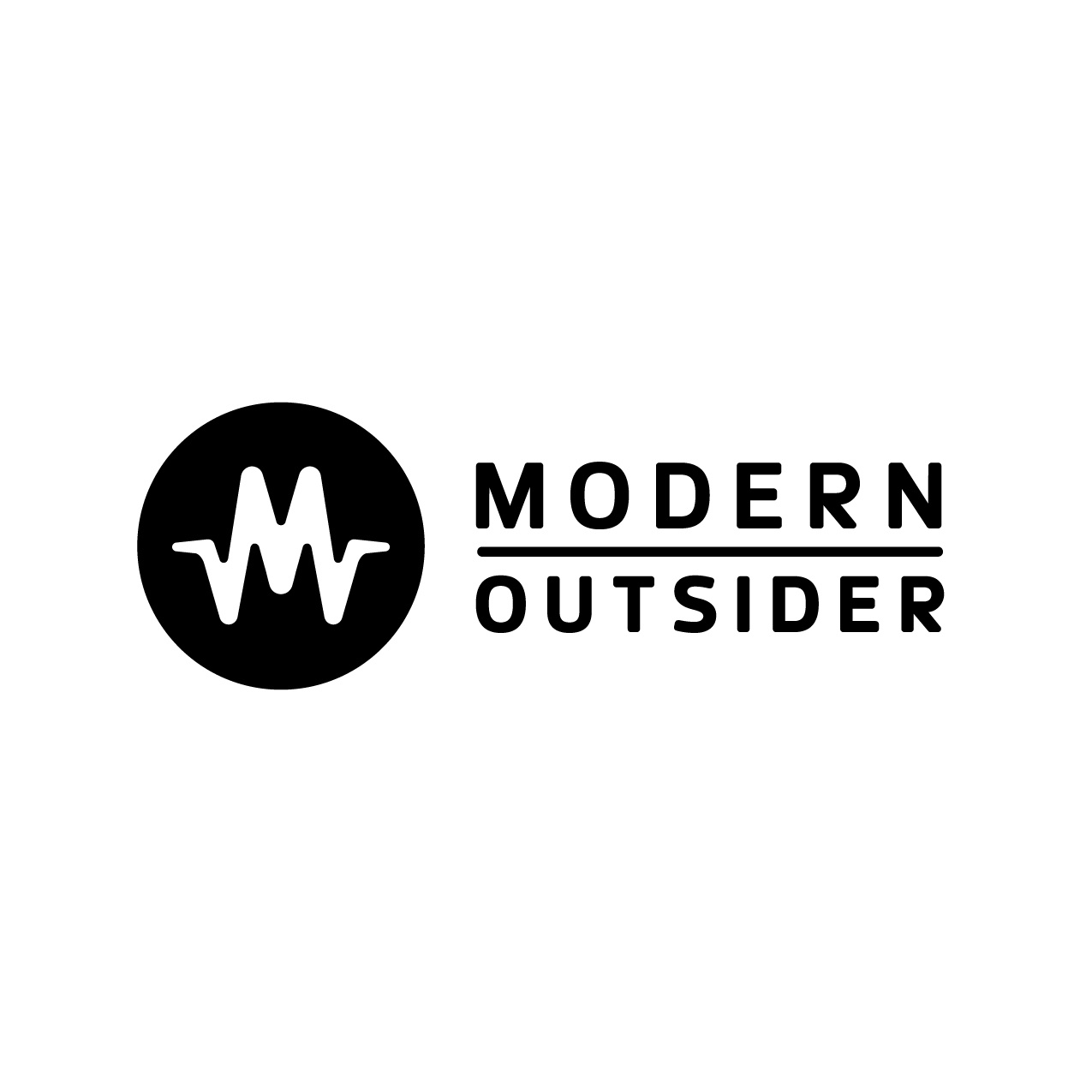
- Founded: 2010
- Founder: Chip Adams; Erin Adams
- Distributor(s): INgrooves
- Genre: Alternative rock Indie rock
- Country of origin: U.S.
- Location: Austin, Texas
- Official website: modernoutsider.com

Modern Outsider is a management company and independent record label founded by husband and wife team, Chip and Erin Adams, in October 2010 in Austin, Texas. Collectively, they have well over two decades of experience in various facets of the music industry, from radio promotion at Dangerbird Records, Capitol Records, The Syndicate and Cornerstone (agency) where they also handled digital marketing; they were in charge of editorial at the tastemaking site, TheTripwire.com.

In January 2016 the label was featured in Austin Monthly.

Modern Outsider was named the Record Label of the Year in 2016 by the Austin Chronicle.

== Roster ==
- The Black and White Years
- Black Pistol Fire
- Brass Bed
- The Bright Light Social Hour
- The Calm Blue Sea
- The Crookes
- Curtis Roush
- Dana Falconberry
- Gliss (band)
- Hard Proof
- Mirror Travel
- Moving Panoramas
- Pomegranates (band)
- Quiet Company
- Soft Swells
- Star Parks
- Tristen Gaspadarek
- Ume
- Walker Lukens

== See also ==
- List of record labels
