= 20,000 Streets Under the Sky (album) =

Studio album by Marah
- Released: June 29, 2004
- Recorded: Philadelphia, Pennsylvania
- Genres: Rock, Country
- Length: 44:36
- Label: Yep Roc
- Producer: Marah

Marah chronology
Float Away With the Friday Night Gods (2002)	20,000 Streets Under the Sky (2004)	Kids in Amsterdam: Live on VPRO (2004)

Professional ratings
Review scores
Source	Rating
Pitchfork	(7.5/10)
Rolling Stone	2/5 stars

20,000 Streets Under the Sky is an album by the band Marah, released in 2004.

== Track listing ==
No.	Title	Length
1.	"East"	4:12
2.	"Freedom Park"	4:35
3.	"Feather Boa"	3:33
4.	"Going Thru the Motions"	4:48
5.	"Sure Thing"	1:51
6.	"Tame the Tiger"	4:12
7.	"Pigeon Heart"	3:55
8.	"Soda"	5:19
9.	"Pizzeria"	3:21
10.	"Body"	4:30
11.	"20,000 Streets Under the Sky"	4:20

== Personnel ==
- Mike Ambs – drums
- David Bielanko – banjo, bass, guitar, vocals
- Serge Bielanko – guitar, harmonica, vocals
- Mark Boyce – organ, piano, clavinet
- Matt Cappy – trumpet
- Kirk Henderson – keyboards, background vocals
- Nancy Falkow – background vocals
- Mike Hood – trombone
- Jamie Mahon – bass
- Jon Wurster – drums
- The Shalitas – background vocals
