= Topaz (Israel Nash album) =

2021 studio album

Studio album by Israel Nash
- Released: March 12, 2021
- Studio: Plum Creek Sound, Dripping Springs, Texas
- Genre: Country rock
- Length: 44:42
- Label: Loose; Desert Folklore; Soundly
- Producer: Israel Nash; Adrian Quesada

Israel Nash chronology
| Lifted (2018) | Topaz (2021) | Ozarker (2023) |

Singles from Topaz
- 1. "Canyonheart" Released: October 30, 2020

Topaz is an album by American musician Israel Nash, released on March 12, 2021, via Loose Music, Desert Folklore Music, and Soundly Music. The album, recorded in Nash's Plum Creek Sound studio in Texas, was first announced in December 2020, subsequent to the release of lead single "Canyonheart".

== Reception ==
Topaz ratings
Aggregate scores
| Source | Rating |
|---|---|
| Metacritic | 81/100 |
Review scores
| Source | Rating |
| PopMatters | 7/10 |
| Uncut | 8/10 |

Review aggregator Metacritic gave Topaz a weighted average score of 81/100, based on 4 reviews, indicating "universal acclaim". Glide Magazine's Jim Hynes called the album "less dense" than Nash's previous release Lifted, and said the album has a "meaty rock foundation with touches of psychedelia and skylark folk that fans have come to love", but "now with soulful heft that nods to Muscle Shoals and Memphis, which in one sense, makes it a bit more tangible than his previous work. Yet it remains moody and vast, cohesive and compelling." For Americana Highways, Andrew Gulden wrote that the album "doubles down on [Nash's] expansive aura while maintaining a dreamy-folk intimacy." PopMatters' Steve Horowitz wrote that "the songs capture the [Texas Hill Country's] landscape's barrenness in a manner reminiscent of 1970s Pink Floyd records or prog-rock of the 1980s where the vastness of the mind was recapitulated in the spaces between the musical notes -- in this case, in service of cosmic country rock." The New Statesman's Ellen Peirson-Hagger, in a review focused on the album's political lyrical content, wrote that "Nash leans into clichés of the country genre, as if towing the line of just how many of its tropes he can get away with using while he figures out his place in the culture", while expressing disappointment in saying "However, I can't help but think how much more zest these tracks would have were they more direct in their lyrical intent." Per Uncut's Andrew Mueller, the album is "a fine racket" of "sumptuous country-soul, leaning heavily on the brass, most obviously evocative of the more ruminative records of Neil Young, or the rockier edges of Rodney Crowell", and "a languid and gently uplifting work" which is "at its best when its angriest."

=== Year-end lists ===
Topaz on year-end lists
| Publication | # | Ref. |
|---|---|---|
| American Songwriter | 4 | |
| Gaffa | 3 | |
| God Is in the TV | 25 | |
| Uncut | 46 | |

== Track listing ==
All tracks are written by Israel Nash.

Topaz track listing
| No. | Title | Length |
|---|---|---|
| 1. | "Dividing Lines" | 4:49 |
| 2. | "Closer" | 5:33 |
| 3. | "Down in the Country" | 3:34 |
| 4. | "Southern Coasts" | 3:36 |
| 5. | "Stay" | 5:05 |
| 6. | "Canyonheart" | 3:51 |
| 7. | "Indiana" | 3:23 |
| 8. | "Howling Wind" | 4:51 |
| 9. | "Sutherland Springs" | 4:41 |
| 10. | "Pressure" | 5:19 |
| Total length: | | 44:42 |

== Personnel ==
- Israel Nash – vocals, guitar, production, engineering
- Adrian Quesada – electric guitar, co-production
- Edward Brailiff – piano
- Josh Fleischmann – drums, percussion
- Scott Davis – bass
- Roger Sollenberger – electric guitar
- Derek Phelps – trumpet
- Joe Woullard – baritone saxophone
- Jason Frey – tenor saxophone
- Eric Swanson – pedal steel guitar, electric guitar, harmonies
- Sam Powell – piano, organ, synth
- Curtis Roush – electric guitar
- Ed Jarusinsky – drums, percussion
- Seth Kauffman – drums, percussion, bass
- Jacob Rodriguez – baritone saxophone, tenor saxophone
- Rockyanne Bullwinkel – background vocals
- Jenny Carson – background vocals
- Taylor Torres – engineering
- Matt Gerhard – engineering
- Kevin Ratterman – mixing, mastering

== Charts ==
Chart performance for Topaz
| Chart (2021) | Peak position |
|---|---|
| Scottish Albums (OCC) | 33 |
| Swedish Vinyl Albums (Sverigetopplistan) | 4 |
| UK Independent Albums (OCC) | 13 |
