= A Christmas Kind of Town =

Studio album by Marah
- Released: 2005
- Recorded: Brooklyn, NY
- Genre: Rock, Christmas
- Length: 41:28
- Label: Yep Roc
- Producer: Marah

Marah chronology
If You Didn't Laugh, You'd Cry (2005)	A Christmas Kind of Town (2005)	Sooner or Later in Spain (2006)

A Christmas Kind of Town is a Christmas album released by the band Marah in 2005.

== Reception ==
Tim Sendra of Allmusic called A Christmas Kind of Town an "utterly heartwarming and joyous album". Jim Musser of the Iowa City Press-Citizen called the album "upbeat, inclusive and downright irresistible". Jay Lustig of The Star-Ledger wrote that the song "New York Is a Christmas Kind of Town" is "a thoroughly modern Christmas song, but one with a classic feel".

== Track listing ==
No.	Title	Length
1.	"Intro-Curtain Rises"	0:14
2.	"Christmas Time Is Here"	2:00
3.	"New York Is a Christmas Kind of Town"	3:01
4.	"Baby It's Cold Outside"	2:36
5.	"Boozing It Up with Friends"	0:21
6.	"Holly Jolly Christmas"	2:16
7.	"Here We Come a Wassailing (#1)"	0:21
8.	"Christmas Time's a Comin'"	1:56
9.	"Let It Snow"	1:59
10.	"Quithmith Pudding (Skit)"	0:37
11.	"Counting the Days ('Til Christmas)"	3:03
12.	"Here We Come a Wassailing (#2)"	0:24
13.	"Silver Bells"	3:06
14.	"Christmas with the Snow"	2:36
15.	"Have Yourself a Merry Little Xmas"	2:29
16.	"Handsome Santa"	0:41
17.	"Auld Lang Syne"	3:01
18.	"Here We Come a Wassailing (#3)"	0:25
19.	"Outro-Curtain Call"	0:31
20.	"Counting the Days, A Christmas Polka"	7:24

== Personnel ==
- David Bielanko – singing, guitar, bass, banjo, percussion, car horns, xylophone, jingle bells, etc.
- Serge Bielanko – singing, guitar, banjo, harmonica, singing into the dryer, percussion, jingle bells, etc.
- Kirk Henderson – piano, organ, mellotron, music box, bass, guitar solo for the ages, xylophone, percussion, trumpets, backing vocals, jingle bells
- Adam Garbinski – guitar, Christmas enthusiasm, backing vocals
- Dave "Fire & Ice" Petersen – drums, backing vocals, Christmas enthusiasm
- Christine Smith – piano, vocals on "It's Cold Outside", drums on "New York Is A Christmas Kind Of Town"
- Ahneeta Shalita – vocals on "Christmas With The Snow" and "Here We Come A-Wassailing", backing vocals, "Bing Bings"
- Kazual Shalita – vocals on "Christmas With The Snow" and "Here We Come A-Wassailing", backing vocals, "Bing Bings"
- Lowlita Shalita vocals on "Christmas With The Snow" and "Here We Come A-Wassailing", backing vocals, "Bing Bings"
- Monica Bielanko – Vocals on "Handsome Santa"
- Gregory "Christmastime" Wilson – Christmas Spirit, snapping, clapping, backing vocals, fried chicken
- Larry Anderson – generosity, backing vocals

The album was dedicate to "anyone and everyone, regardless of religion or race, who just likes it when December rolls in."
