= Hunters (album) =

Soundtrack album by the Residents
- Released: 1995
- Studio: Magic Shop, New York City

The Residents chronology
Gingerbread Man (1994)	Hunters (1995)	Have a Bad Day (1996)

Hunters is an album by American art rock band the Residents. Released in 1995, it is a soundtrack album commissioned for the Discovery Channel series Hunters: The World of Predators and Prey. The entire album is ten hours long, the largest soundtrack project that the Residents had attempted. The series with the music first aired in December 1994 and the soundtrack CD was released early in 1995.

== Track listing ==
1. "Hunters Prelude"
2. "The Deadly Game"
3. "Tooth and Claw"
4. "The Dangerous Sea"
5. "Rulers of the Deep"
6. "Track of the Cat"
7. "The Giant Grizzlies"
8. "Dawn of the Dragons"
9. "Eye of the Serpent"
10. "The Crawling Kingdom"
11. "The Savage Pack"
12. "Hunters Reprise"

== Credits ==
- Manufactured By – BMG Music
- Copyright © – Milan Entertainment, Inc.
- Produced At – The Magic Shop
- Mastered At – Master Cutting Room
- Phonographic Copyright ℗ – Telenova Productions, Inc.
- Manufactured By – HMG (2)
- Distributed By – BMG Music
- Copyright © – Telenova Productions, Inc.
- Edited At – The Magic Shop
- Art Direction [Album] – Judy Kaganowich
- Edited By [Digital Editing] – Oliver Straus
- Executive-Producer [Album] – Robert Fish
- Executive-Producer [Executive In Charge Of Production] – Clark Bunting
- Executive-Producer [For Telenova] – Barry Clark (6), Terry Tanner
- Executive-Producer [For The Discovery Channel] – Angus Yates, Steve Burns (13)
- Executive-Producer [Milan] – Emmanuel Chamboredon, Toby Pieniek
- Mastered By – Joe Brescio
- Producer [Album], Edited By [Album] – Steve Rosenthal
- Supervised By [Package Supervision] – Chris Maguire
- Written-By, Performer, Producer [Music] – The Residents
