= Float Away with the Friday Night Gods =

Float Away With the Friday Night Gods

Studio album by Marah
- Released: 16 July 2002
- Recorded: England
- Genre: Rock, Country
- Label: Artemis Records
- Producer: Owen Morris

Marah chronology
Kids in Philly (2000)	Float Away With the Friday Night Gods (2002)	20,000 Streets Under the Sky (2004)

Professional ratings
Review scores
Source	Rating
Rolling Stone	3/5 stars
Allmusic	3.5/5 stars

Float Away With the Friday Night Gods (FAWTFNG) is an album by the band Marah, released in 2002. The Bielanko Brothers were joined by Jamie Mahon and Jon Kois of The Three 4 Tens.

In 2005, the band released the demos of the FAWTFNG sessions on its PHIdelity label.

== Track listing ==
1. "Float Away" – 5:35
2. "Soul" – 2:14
3. "Revolution" – 5:21
4. "People of the Underground" – 4:33
5. "Crying on an Airplane" – 5:02
6. "Leaving" – 4:20
7. "Shame" – 4:38
8. "For All We Know We're Dreaming" – 5:28
9. "What 2 Bring" – 4:26
10. "Out in Style" – 6:22

== Personnel ==
- Dave Bielanko - Guitar, Vocals
- Serge Bielanko - Guitar, Vocals
- Jamie Mahon - Bass Guitar, Vocals
- Jon Kois - Drums, Percussion
- Bruce Springsteen - Lead Guitar and Background Vocals on "Float Away"
