= Lifted (Israel Nash album) =

Studio album by Israel Nash
- Released: July 27, 2018
- Studio: Plum Creek Studio
- Genre: Americana
- Length: 45:17
- Label: Loose Music

Israel Nash chronology
Neighbors (2016)	Lifted (2018)	Topaz (2019)

Professional ratings
Aggregate scores
Source	Rating
AnyDecentMusic?	7.1/10
Metacritic	79/100
Review scores
Source	Rating
The Austin Chronicle	4/5 stars
Louder Than War	9/10
Paste	7.4/10

Lifted is the fifth studio album by American singer-songwriter Israel Nash. It was released on July 27, 2018, under Loose Music.

== Production ==
The album was recorded at Israel Nash's studio Plum Creek Studio in Dripping Springs, Texas.

== Critical reception ==
Lifted was met with "generally favorable" reviews from critics. At Metacritic, which assigns a weighted average rating out of 100 to reviews from mainstream publications, this release received an average score of 79, based on 7 reviews. Aggregator Album of the Year gave the release a 76 out of 100 based on a critical consensus of 4 reviews.

== Track listing ==
Lifted track listing
No.	Title	Length
1.	"Rolling On (Intro)"	1:05
2.	"Rolling On"	4:33
3.	"Looking Glass"	5:11
4.	"Lucky Ones"	3:55
5.	"Sweet Springs (Intro)"	0:23
6.	"Sweet Springs"	3:52
7.	"SpiritFalls"	4:25
8.	"Northwest Stars (Out of Tacoma)"	4:17
9.	"Hillsides"	4:53
10.	"The Widow"	4:16
11.	"Strong Was the Night"	4:53
12.	"Golden Fleeces"	3:34
