= Brenda Kahn =

American singer-songwriter

- Born: Brenda Lynn Kahn; May 3, 1967 (age 59)
- Origin: Connecticut, U.S.
- Genres: pop, rock
- Occupations: Singer, songwriter, poet, educator
- Years active: 1990–present
- Label: Chaos
- Website: brendakahn.com

Brenda Kahn (born May 3, 1967) is an American singer-songwriter, poet and educator based in Boulder, Colorado, who is known for her poetic lyrics.

== Background ==
Her career began in 1990, when her first album, Goldfish Don't Talk Back, was released to critical acclaim. Her punk-tinged folk music led to a major label deal with the Chaos label at Columbia Records, and in 1992, Kahn released Epiphany in Brooklyn. This album, which featured Kahn's darkly humorous stories of love, confusion, and tragedy in urban America, was heralded by critics and fans throughout the United States. People magazine compared her to the Violent Femmes and Patti Smith. Creem Magazine dubbed her "the high priestess of the apocalyptic relationship." Kahn was selected to open up for Bob Dylan and The Kinks, toured the US and Europe, and seemed on the brink of stardom.

Chaos Records folded just two weeks before Kahn's awaited third release, the rock-tinged Destination Anywhere. Her next two albums, both featuring more electric guitar, were released under the independent label Shanachie Records, and she continued to tour Europe (particularly Germany), the east coast and midwest through the late 1990s.

Kahn performed at Lilith Fair in 1998 and 1999. In 1999, she founded Womanrock.com, Inc, an online magazine and music store designed to unite and empower female artists and give tips on how to navigate through the record industry. That same year, she self-released her fifth album, the acoustic and spoken word Hunger, which was a tribute to her late friend Jeff Buckley.

In 2010, Kahn released her sixth album, Seven Laws of Gravity, featuring New York studio musicians Jack Petruzelli, Adrian Harpham and Craig Dreyer and produced by Craig Dreyer. A review by Soundtrack3 praised the album saying, "Kahn’s music is less punk-folk now, and more alternative-country, but the lyrics remain poetic and beautiful. The hooks in this album dig their heels in and don’t let go. It’s great to have Kahn making music again."

In 2017, Kahn released Rocket to the Moon, a children's album, featuring the production work of multi-instrumentalist and engineer Matt Molchany.

== Discography ==
=== Albums ===
- Goldfish Don't Talk Back (1990, Community 3)
- Epiphany in Brooklyn (1992 Chaos Produced by David Kahne)
- Destination Anywhere (1996 Shanachie)
- Outside the Beauty Salon (1997 Shanachie)
- Hunger (1999 Rocket 99)
- Seven Laws of Gravity (2010 Law of Seven)
- Rocket to the Moon (2017 Little Yellow Truck)

=== EPs and singles ===
- 60 Second Critic (with Dave Pirner)
- "Life in the Drug War Trenches" (1992 Crackpot) (vinyl EP 7" single)
- Anesthesia (1993 Chaos)
- King of Cairo (1994 Chaos)
- "Hey Romeo" (1995 TBC Records) (vinyl 7" single)
- Remington
- Alright OK (2023)

=== Books ===
- Ode to Chores: The Good, The Bad, and The Laundry (2019, South Salem Press)
