= Grace Pool =

American alternative rock band (1987–1992)

- Origin: New York City
- Genres: Indie folk; alternative rock; synth-pop; dream pop; jangle pop; indie pop
- Years active: 1987–1992
- Label: Reprise
- Past members: Elly Brown; Bob Riley; Clifford Carter; Frank Vilardi; Terry Radigan; Beki Brindle; Andy Burton

Grace Pool was an American alternative rock band, the main musical project of singer-songwriter Elly Brown and musician-producer Bob Riley. The band formed in the 1980s and released two studio albums for Reprise Records. Their sound incorporated several influences, chiefly indie folk, dream pop, and new wave music, blending vocal harmonies, acoustic guitars, and drums, with airy synth atmospherics and digital percussion.

== History ==
=== 1980–1987: Formation ===
Grace Pool founders Elly Brown and Bob Riley met when they were bandmates in South, a music project featuring the guitarist Lonnie Mack. Brown was already well known for her own bands in the New York club scene, and was hired to sing harmonies and some "girl vocals." Riley had established himself as an in-demand session musician. During the South rehearsals, Brown and Riley wrote the first of many songs together. When South came to a sudden end after the death of the band's founder and patron, Brown and Riley returned to their previous musical projects, remaining close friends and songwriting partners.
Three years later, Brown and Riley had fallen in love, married, and moved into a house in Lincolndale, a rural suburb in upstate New York. Riley created an in-home studio where he created sequenced drum tracks and played guitar while Brown sang. During the next several years, the natural surroundings of upstate New York were an inspiration for the songs that formed Grace Pool's repertoire. When Brown and Riley decided it was time for the songs to be played for audiences, they recruited some musician friends into the band. Clifford Carter and Frank Vilardi were brought in on keyboards and drums. Shawn Colvin, a friend of Elly Brown, played guitar for the early Grace Pool rehearsals and performances. Their New York City debut was at the CBGB, chosen for the club's highly regarded sound system. Not long after, Colvin's solo career became a full-time occupation. Her place was filled by Terry Radigan, a young girl from Brooklyn. Grace Pool signed on with Reprise in 1987 when Elly Brown's best friend, who worked at Warner Bros. Records, slipped a demo tape to a music executive. Within weeks, the band was offered a contract.

=== 1988–1989: Grace Pool ===
The band's first album, the self-titled Grace Pool, was released in August 1988. The record was produced by Steve Nye, known for his atmospheric style on recordings by Bryan Ferry, David Sylvian, Clannad, and many others. Trouser Press praised Nye's "deft touches of synthesizer ambiance and quiet grandeur," and called Grace Pool "a record with catchy songs, fine harmonies and intricately subtle arrangements." The Washington Post described Brown's "clear, cool-water voice" "luxurious" harmonies, "sensual, not sorrowful" minor-key melodies, and the band's songs as having "a dreamy, pre-Raphaelite beauty." The collection of original songs also includes Grace Pool's cover of a song by The Blue Nile, "Stay," a song that Elly Brown knew she wanted to sing from the moment she heard it.
The band was named in a New York Times article along with k.d. lang, Joan Jett, Edie Brickell and Cocteau Twins as part of "a diverse, intelligent, self-directed and eccentric bunch of female performers" with new recordings in 1988. Rolling Stone introduced the band to their readers in New Faces. Grace Pool was nominated for a New York Music Award in the Best Debut Album category.

=== 1990–1991: Where We Live ===
The recording of Where We Live, Grace Pool's second album, brought changes in band members and changes of perspective and attitude. Brown has described the album as "songs of struggle and not understanding the world so well." There was also a change of producer in the studio, as Bob Riley was allowed to take over production duties. With many years as a New York studio musician and a passion for music technology, Riley crafted the album with what the Chicago Tribune called "a polished, stylish sound." Music journalist Stewart Mason wrote that Where We Live was "less abstract and artsy" than the debut album with "more of a rock edge." He described the album's songs with minor-key melodies as "a collection of haunting tunes." Beki Brindle was the band's new lead guitarist on the album, replacing Terry Radigan who had set off on her own career. Andy Burton, known for his keyboard work on the Hammond organ, became the band's keyboardist.
The band was also beginning to feel the effects of being a part of a music industry, after years immersed in the New York music scene. In Brown's words, "we were losing the stars in our eyes."
Signing to a major record label with headquarters on the distant West Coast proved to be a less than perfect fit for the band, and Grace Pool was released from contract by Warners after sales of Where We Live were not as strong as the debut. The group disbanded in 1992.

=== Post-band life, recordings and collaborations ===
After Grace Pool, each of the members remained deeply involved in music. Brown and Riley began a family and raised two children while working on new musical projects. Elly Brown recorded a solo album, Wax the Roses in 2004. Bob Riley collaborated with various artists including Mary Fahl, originally of October Project. Grace Pool's guitarists, Terry Radigan and Beki Brindle, have fronted their own bands and recorded solo albums, continuing to tour. Frank Vilardi went on to record or tour with various bands including Rosanne Cash, Suzanne Vega, Rod Stewart and many others. He is currently a member of The Bacon Brothers band. Keyboardist Clifford Carter worked extensively with James Taylor among many others and recorded a solo album, Walkin' Into the Sun, in 1993. Keyboardist Andy Burton is currently a member of The Schramms.

== Discography ==
- Grace Pool (1988)
1. "Awake With the Rain"
2. "Stay"
3. "Fields"
4. "Radio Religion"
5. "Under the Wrong Wing"
6. "Still the Spirit"
7. "Green Glass House"
8. "Out of the Wild"
9. "1000 Nights"
- Where We Live (1990)
1. "Me Without You"
2. "Once a Forest"
3. "Wedding on the Lawn"
4. "Paint the Ending"
5. "August Freeze"
6. "I Can't See You"
7. "Dream and Distance"
8. "Springs Desire"
9. "Swing Hard"
10. "Sweet Law of Repetition"

== Band members ==
- Elly Brown, vocals
- Bob Riley, guitars, programming, synth
- Terry Radigan, lead guitar
- Clifford Carter, keyboards
- Frank Vilardi, drums
- Beki Brindle, lead guitar
- Andy Burton, keyboards
