= The Fieros =

American rock band

The Fieros are an American rock band founded by brothers Joey and Aaron McClellan with good friends Chris Holston and Laura Harrell. They were originally named The Valentines but changed their name due to the number of other bands with the same name. The Fieros were joined by drummer McKenzie Smith from the band Midlake in 2008.

They have received two Dallas Observer Awards, one for Best New Act in 2006, and Best Indie Rock in 2007.

The Fieros relocated to Brooklyn, New York in the summer of 2008 and subsequently released their self-titled debut EP on January 26, 2010.
