= Kids in Philly =

Studio album by Marah
- Released: 21 March 2000
- Recorded: Above Frank's Auto, South Philadelphia, October 1999
- Genre: Rock, Alternative country
- Length: 37:17
- Label: Artemis Records
- Producer: Paul Smith

Marah chronology
Let's Cut The Crap & Hook Up Later on Tonight (1998)	Kids in Philly (2000)	Float Away With the Friday Night Gods (2002)

Professional ratings
Review scores
Source	Rating
AllMusic	4/5 stars
The Austin Chronicle	3.5/5 stars
The Boston Phoenix	3/4 stars
Q	4/5 stars
Rolling Stone	3.5/5 stars
The Rolling Stone Album Guide	3.5/5 stars
The Village Voice	B−

Kids in Philly is the second studio album by the band Marah, released in 2000. The songs draw from musical influences including Bruce Springsteen, Mummer string bands, Phil Spector and roots rock, while the album's lyrics are rooted in the band's Philadelphia home. Kids in Philly garnered widespread critical praise for its energetic abandon, lyrical sincerity and depth, and unabashed pilfering of numerous musical influences.

Reviews of subsequent Marah albums would make comparisons with Kids in Philly so often that Dave Bielanko would lament it as "my old albatross" on 2010's Life is a Problem.

== Track listing ==
1. "Faraway You" – 3:30
2. "Point Breeze" – 2:14
3. "Christian Street" – 3:21
4. "It's Only Money, Tyrone" – 3:26
5. "My Heart Is The Bums On The Street" – 2:19
6. "The Catfisherman" – 3:55
7. "Round-Eye Blues" – 4:11
8. "From The Skyline of a Great Big Town" – 3:31
9. "Barstool Boys" – 2:57
10. "The History of Where Someone Has Been Killed" – 4:05
11. "This Town" – 3:38

== Personnel ==
- Dave Bielanko: Organ, Najo, Guitar, Piano, Chimes, Xylophone
- Serge Bielanko: Banjo, Guitar, Harmonica, Percussion, Xylophone
- Jeff Clarke: Bagpipes
- Michael Hood: Trombone
- Bruce Langfeld: Organ, Acoustic Guitar, Mandolin, Piano
- Danny Metz: Banjo, Bass
- Paul Smith: Organ, Guitar, Percussion, Electric Piano, Mixing
- Ronnie Vance: Percussion, Drums
