= Jammin' Java =

Music club and coffee bar in Virginia, US

- Interactive map of Jammin' Java
- Address: 227 Maple Avenue East
- Location: Vienna, Virginia 22180 US
- Coordinates: 38°54′15″N 77°15′40.2″W
- Owner: Daniel, Jonathan, and Luke Brindley
- Seating type: Standing and seating
- Capacity: 200
- Type: Coffeehouse

Construction
- Opened: October 8, 1999; 27 years ago
- Renovated: November 15, 2001; 24 years ago

Website
- https://www.unionstagepresents.com/jammin-java/shows

Jammin' Java is a music club and coffee bar in Vienna, Virginia, which focuses on local and independent musical acts. The 200-seat venue has hosted eminent artists such as Nick Jonas, Paramore, Bon Iver, Owl City, Meiko, Sub-Radio, and Ingrid Michaelson. It was founded in 1999, and in 2001 was bought and revamped by the Brindley brothers who currently own and run it. According to Pollstar, it has become a top-100 club in ticket sales in the world since its Brindley ownership. It was also named one of the top 40 music clubs in America by Paste magazine.

== History ==
=== Christian roots ===
The first Jammin' Java opened in 1998 in a former pool hall in Kent Island, Maryland. The owners, Paul and Theresa Klassen, wanted to develop Maryland into a center for Christian music. It was the Klassens' teenage son who gave them the idea to create a chain of community spaces that offered musicians and coffee, with a focus on nondenominational Christianity. The Klassens had previously opened a 1,000-square-foot nonprofit recording studio, named Waters Edge, which was available to Christian recording artists.

On November 8, 1999, the second Jammin' Java was opened in a strip mall in Vienna, Virginia. The former Rite Aid became a coffee shop, small music venue, recording studio, and a music store that sold guitars and amplifiers. The venue mainly featured Contemporary Christian music and small acts, but it was described by the manager Matt Turner as being "faith-based and non-denominational" and did not feature Christian iconography. The Klaasens also helped groups in Indianapolis and Orlando open their own Jammin' Java locations.

=== Brindley brothers ownership ===
The Klaussens closed the original Jammin' Java in Kent Island, and they sold the Jammin' Java in Vienna to brothers Daniel, Jonathan, and Luke Brindley on October 15, 2001. The brothers, all musicians originally from New Jersey, were interested in opening a place where other musicians could play and began to renovate the venue to improve its musical capabilities. Renovations to the venue included building a new stage and installing new lighting and sound system, as well as a full bar.

The club reopened on October 15, 2001. The new owners removed the Christian focus of the venue, they began serving alcohol and full meals, and they booked more musicians to its stage. The musical acts originally focused on singer-songwriters and local bands, but has since moved on to more varied offerings such as punk, rock, and pop artists. Over the years the venue became more successful and well-known, earning accolades such as being named one of the top 40 music clubs in America by Paste magazine, topping reader polls from The Washington Post for local live venues and being named one of the best places to hear live music by AOL Cityguide.

In October 2011, Jammin' Java celebrated its tenth anniversary under the Brindley owners. The anniversary month featured special events and concerts and allowed patrons to buy a month-long pass for $100.

== Services ==
As a musical venue, Jammin' Java is a 200-seat club that offers daily live music. Shows average more than once daily and the venue has held about 7,000 concerts from 2001 to 2011. During the day Jammin' Java features Tot Rock, a family-oriented music series. The club also teaches music lessons with Music School at Jammin' Java.

Co-owner Daniel Brindley also operates an artist management company out of the club with Go Team! Music Artist Management as well as a record label, Go Team! Records. Artists managed by the company include Chelsea Lee, Rocknoceros and Deep River.
