= Let's Cut the Crap & Hook Up Later on Tonight =

Let's Cut the Crap & Hook Up Later On Tonight

Studio album by Marah
- Released: 1998
- Recorded: Philadelphia, PA
- Genres: Rock, alt-country
- Label: Black Dog
- Producer: Marah

Marah chronology
Let's Cut the Crap & Hook Up Later On Tonight (1998)	Kids in Philly (2000)

2004 rerelease
- The Cover Art for the rerelease of LCTC

Professional ratings
Review scores
Source	Rating
AllMusic	4/5 stars
Pitchfork Media	8.9/10

Let's Cut the Crap & Hook Up Later On Tonight (LCTC) is the debut album by the American band Marah, released in 1998.

== Track listing ==
1. "Fever" – 4:28
2. "Another Day at Bay" – 1:37
3. "Eventually Rock" – 1:35
4. "Formula, Cola, Dollar Draft" – 4:43
5. "Baby Love" – 1:52
6. "Phantom Eyes" – 2:29
7. "Rain Delay" (featuring Harry Kalas) – 2:38
8. "Firecracker" – 4:16
9. "Head On" – 2:51
10. "For the Price of a Song" – 3:00
11. "Boat" – 2:37
12. "Limb" – 9:12
13. "Punk Rock Radio" (Hidden Track) – 6:24

== Personnel ==
- David Bielanko – singing, guitar, banjo, accordion moment, dulcimer, Marlboro Lights, secretarial duties, mess-ups, etc.
- Serge Bielanko – background singing, guitar, banjo, harmonica, steel drum moment, punk rock radio, mess-ups, etc.
- Danny Metz – stand-up, sit-down bass, South Philly do-wop moment, cell-phone, beeper, mess-ups, etc.
- Ronnie Vance – drums, cymbals, sticks, sweet spot or not, shouting, mess-ups, etc.

== Rerelease ==
In 2004, the album was rereleased on Marah's own PHIdelity label. In addition to new cover artwork, the rerelease included 6 previously unreleased tracks:

1. "Night Time"
2. "Borderline"
3. "Family Meeting"
4. "Johnny & the Flower"
5. "Dance 'till Dawn"
6. "Muskie Moon"
