= Rocknoceros =

- Origin: Fairfax, Virginia, United States
- Genres: Children's Music
- Years active: 2005–present
- Members: Marc "Boogie Woogie Bennie" Capponi; Patrick "Williebob" Williams
- Past members: David "Coach" Cotton
- Website: www.rocknoceros.com

Rocknoceros is an American children's band formed in Fairfax, Virginia, United States in 2005. The band consists of two members, both childhood friends: Marc "Boogie Woogie Bennie" Capponi and Patrick "Williebob" Williams. A third, founding member, David "Coach" Cotton, retired from the band effective January 1, 2020. Rocknoceros has performed at many venues, including Lollapalooza, Austin City Limits, Wolf Trap, and The Kennedy Center. Their fifth album, "Plymouth Rockers", was released in June 2015.

== Media ==
=== Discography ===
- Rocknoceros (2006)
- Dark Side of the Moon Bounce (2007)
- PINK! (2009)
- Colonel Purple Turtle (2011)
- Plymouth Rockers (2015)
- Happy Holidays from Rocknoceros (2015)

=== Podcast ===
Rocknoceros began publishing a podcast, the "Rocknoceros Podnoceros", in August 2017.
