= Walker Lukens =

Walker Lukens is an American singer, songwriter, multi-instrumentalist based in Austin, Texas. His music blends elements of pop, rock, blues, soul and electronic music.

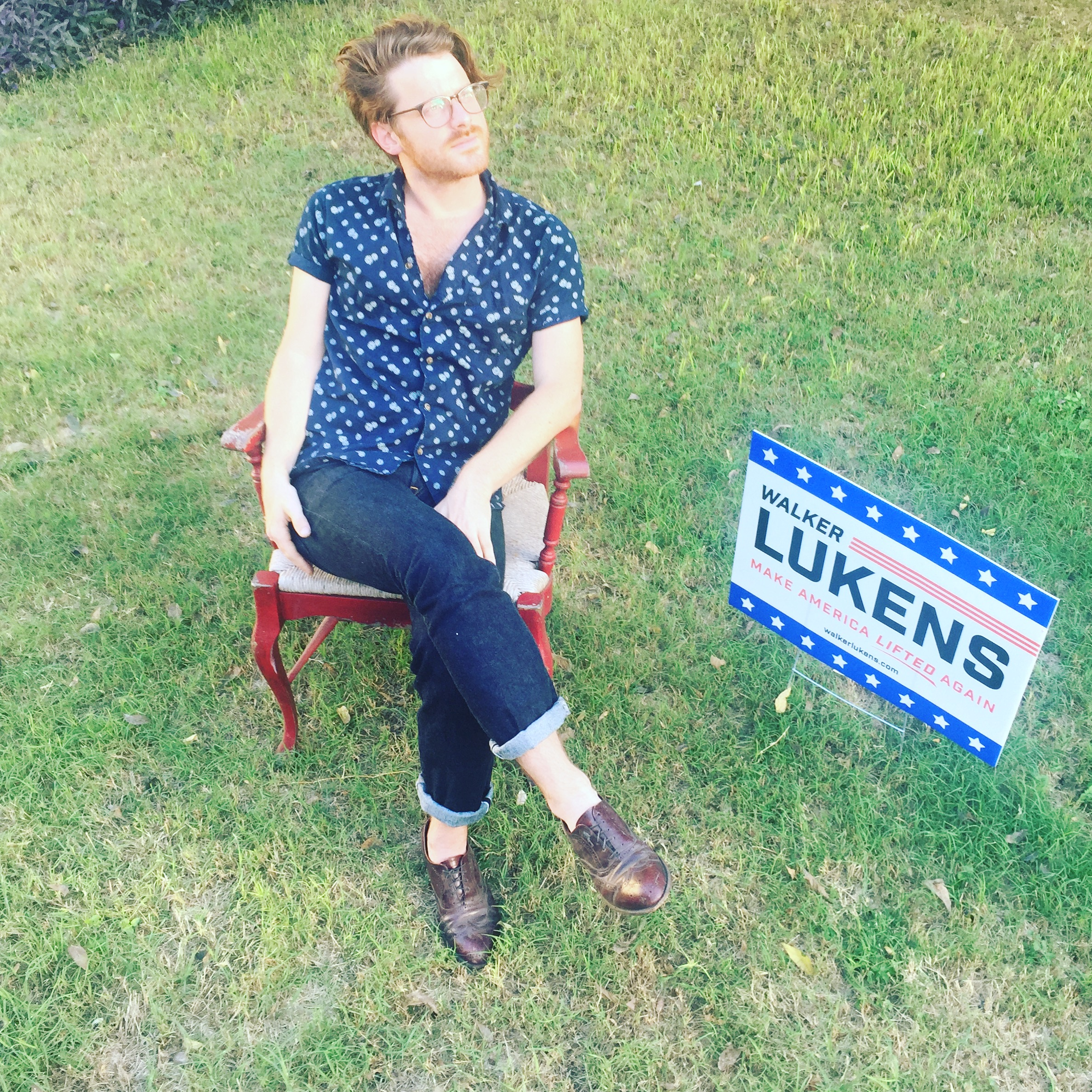
Walker Lukens sitting with his 'Make America Lifted Again' sign for promotion of his Never Understood EP

Walker Lukens has been called ‘one of the best songwriters in Texas’. He has been called ‘wonderfully inventive’, a ‘non-sexually intimidating version of Prince’, and a ‘veteran balladeer with sudden indie rock ambitions’. People often mistake Walker's name for Walter. He thinks this is very humorous. He performs regularly with The Side Arms, who consist of Zac Catanzaro, Mckenzie Griffin, Grant Himmler, and Kyle Vonderau.

In 2013, Lukens released his first full-length record, Devoted. It received praise from outlets like NPR’s All Songs Considered, American Songwriter, Austin American Statesman, Austin Chronicle, and Billboard and took Lukens and his backing band, The Side Arms, all over the US.

After meeting Spoon drummer Jim Eno in a bar, Walker & The Side Arms started recording new music with Jim at his studio, Public Hi-Fi. Their first collaboration, ‘Every Night,’ has been streamed almost a million times now. Their second collaboration, ‘Lifted’ from Never Understood EP (Modern Outsider) spent 8 weeks on the specialty commercial radio charts.

Another EP, Ain't Got A Reason, soon followed in April 2017 and garnered Walker spots at festivals across the country like Bonnaroo, Firefly, Austin City Limits Festival, Free Press Summerfest, Middle of the Map, Underground Music Showcase. His second full length, Tell It To The Judge, was released on September 22, 2017 on Modern Outsider.
