= Mark Boyce (singer) =

Australian singer

- Born: Mark Boyce
- Origin: Australia
- Genres: Pop music
- Occupation: Singer
- Years active: 1990–1992

Mark Boyce (born 6 March 1960) is an Australian singer, particularly known in France for his 1990 hit "Hey Little Girl".

Boyce was a solo artist, had a minor role in movies, and has had a modelling career when, in 1990, he decided to start a solo career with the song "Hey Little Girl", which peaked at No.6 on the French SNEP Singles Chart, and was certified Silver disc by the SNEP. Since then, the song has been much broadcast on radio.

He lives in Australia.

== Discography ==
He released three singles from his album All Over the World : "Hey Little Girl"; plus "Questa Sera" and "Classic Story of Love", which both achieved minor success (they failed to enter the French Singles Chart).
