= Mia Carruthers =

American singer-songwriter

- Born: March 30, 1991 (age 34)
- Origin: Cincinnati, Ohio United States
- Genres: Acoustic, Synthpop, Shoegaze, Rock

Mia Carruthers (born March 30, 1991) is a singer-songwriter, bassist, and music producer.

In the late-2000s, she was one of the main cast members of MTV's Taking the Stage. Carruthers and her family moved from West Chester Township to Cincinnati so that Mia could enroll at the School for Creative and Performing Arts (S.C.P.A.) as a freshman, majoring in music. Since then she has performed at coffeehouses in the local area. She plays several instruments: the guitar, alto saxophone and the piano. Carruthers comes from a musical family. From 2007 to 2012, she and her brother Alex played in her rock band "Mia Carruthers and the Retros". Her singer-songwriter father, Dan Carruthers, recorded three albums with Jackbone, a Zanesville rock band. Carruthers released an EP album titled We Will Grow, available on iTunes.

From 2013 to 2015, she co-fronted the shoegaze pop group Multimagic. In 2016, she became the Artist Production head at Gwynne Sound studios in Cincinnati, OH. She is now currently the lead vocalist and bassist of synthpop trio Passeport

As of October 2021, she is part of the Austin, Texas-based psychedelic rock band The Bright Light Social Hour, providing vocals and keyboards.

She has recently started a new project called Midamerica with Curtis Roush. Releasing single “new drug” on December 7th, 2025
