= Børns discography =

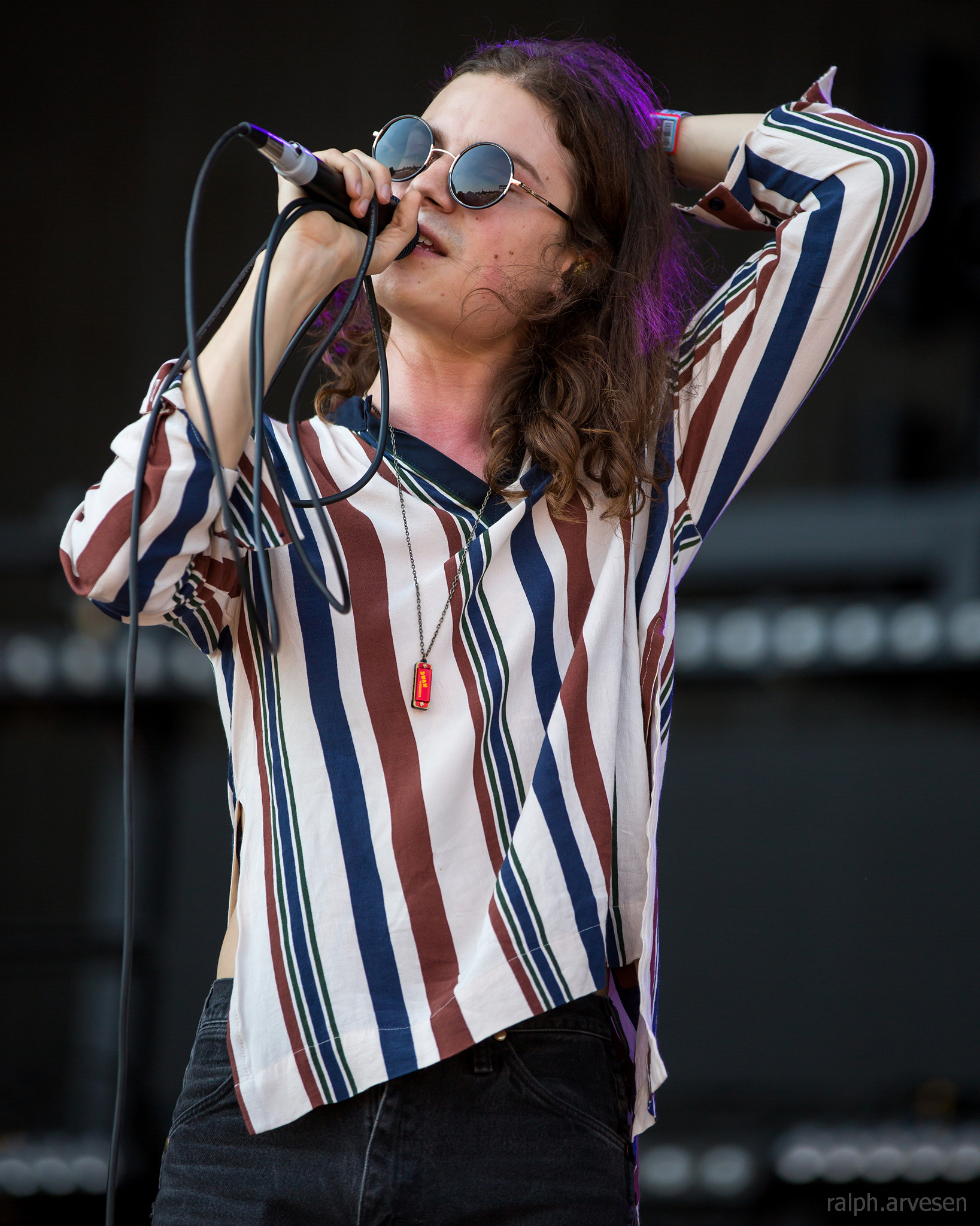
- Børns performing at the Austin City Limits Music Festival on October 11, 2015
- Studio albums: 2
- EPs: 4
- Live albums: 2
- Singles: 11
- Music videos: 5

American singer and songwriter Børns has released two studio albums, two live albums, four extended plays, 11 singles (including one as a featured artist), and five music videos. Børns released his first EP, A Dream Between, in 2012, and released his debut studio album, Dopamine, on October 16, 2015.

== Albums ==
=== Studio albums ===
Title	Details	Peak chart positions						Certifications
Title	Details	US	US Alt	US Rock	AUS Hit.	CAN	NZ Heat	Certifications
Dopamine	Released: October 16, 2015; Label: REZidual, Geffen, Interscope; Formats: CD, LP, digital download	24	2	2	—	56	—	RIAA: Gold
Blue Madonna	Released: January 12, 2018; Label: Interscope; Formats: CD, LP, digital download	49	3	6	8	80	8	
"—" denotes a recording that did not chart or was not released in that territory.

=== Live albums ===
Title	Details
Live on KCRW's Morning Becomes Eclectic	Released: April 16, 2016; Label: Interscope; Formats: LP
Spotify Sessions	Released: 2016; Label: Interscope; Formats: Streaming

== Extended plays ==
Title	Details	Peak chart positions				Sales
Title	Details	US	US Heat	US Alt	US Rock	Sales
A Dream Between (as Garrett Borns)	Released: January 25, 2012; Label: REZidual	—	—	—	—	
Candy	Released: November 10, 2014; Label: Geffen, Interscope	104	2	15	22	US: 31,000
Suddenly	Released: July 28, 2023; Label: Beautiful Glamorous Records	—	—	—	—	
Honeybee	Released: January 17, 2025; Label: Beautiful Glamorous Records	—	—	—	—	
"—" denotes a recording that did not chart or was not released in that territory.

== Singles ==
=== As lead artist ===
Title	Year	Peak chart positions										Certifications	Album
Title	Year	US Bub.	US Rock	AUS	CAN Rock	HUN	IRE	LTU	SCO	UK Sales	WW	Certifications	Album
"Beyond the Coal"	2011	—	—	—	—	—	—	—	—	—	—		Non-album singles
"Deadbolt"	2012	—	—	—	—	—	—	—	—	—	—		Non-album singles
"Wasting My Time"	2012	—	—	—	—	—	—	—	—	—	—		Non-album singles
"Seeing Stars"	2014	—	—	—	—	—	—	—	—	—	—		Candy
"Electric Love"	2015	13	12	52	24	34	60	68	72	82	97	RIAA: Platinum; ARIA: 2× Platinum; BPI: Platinum; MC: Platinum	Dopamine
"10,000 Emerald Pools"	2015	—	35	—	—	—	—	—	—	—	—	RIAA: Gold	Dopamine
"Sunday Morning" (featuring Petite Meller)	2015	—	—	—	—	—	—	—	—	—	—		Non-album single
"American Money"	2016	—	36	—	—	—	—	—	—	—	—		Dopamine
"It's You"	2016	—	—	—	—	—	—	—	—	—	—		Non-album single
"Faded Heart"	2017	—	— (Note: "Faded Heart" did not enter the Hot Rock Songs chart, but peaked at number 49 on the Rock Airplay chart.)	—	—	—	—	—	—	—	—		Blue Madonna
"Sweet Dreams"	2017	—	—	—	—	—	—	—	—	—	—		Blue Madonna
"I Don't Want U Back"	2017	—	45	—	—	—	—	—	—	—	—		Blue Madonna
"God Save Our Young Blood" (with Lana Del Rey)	2017	—	17	—	—	—	—	—	—	—	—		Blue Madonna
"—" denotes a recording that did not chart or was not released in that territory.

=== As featured artist ===
List of featured singles
Title	Year	Album	Reference
"Free" (Broods featuring Børns and Tommy English)	2016	non-album single	
"Fool's Gold" (Dagny featuring Børns)	2016	Ultraviolet	
"Papernote" (Tigertown featuring Børns and Tommy English)	2016	Papernote EP	
"Dawn Storm" (T. Rex cover)	2020	Angelheaded Hipster: The Songs of Marc Bolan & T. Rex	

== Music videos ==
List of music videos featuring Børns
Title	Year	Reference
"10,000 Emerald Pools"	2015	
"Electric Love"	2015	
"American Money" (featuring Larsen Thompson)	2016	
"Faded Heart"	2017	
"I Don't Want U Back" (featuring Stormi Bree)	2018	
"We Don’t Care”	2018	
"Dawn Storm" (T. Rex cover)	2020	
