= List of Rykodisc artists =

This is a list of artists who have recorded for Rykodisc Records.
Listed in parentheses are names of affiliated labels for which the artist recorded for Rykodisc in conjunction with.

== A ==
- Andrew Bird's Bowl of Fire
- Auto Interiors

== B ==
- Badfinger
- Bang Gang
- Sally Barker
- Basshunter (Cordless/Rykodisc)
- Chris Bell
- Jay Bennett
- Big Star
- Breakup Breakdown (Cordless/Rykodisc)
- David Bowie
- Kevin Brown
- Peter Bruntnell (Slow River/Rykodisc)

== C ==
- Belinda Carlisle
- Bootsy Collins
- Elvis Costello and the Attractions
- The Crash
- Robert Cray
- Justin Currie
- Catie Curtis
- John Cale (Hannibal)
- Justin Currie

== D ==
- Dangerous Muse (Cordless/Rykodisc)
- Dave Stewart & Barbara Gaskin (Rykodisc)
- Death Angel
- Del Lords, The (Restless/Rykodisc)
- Devo
- Die Mannequin (Cordless/Rykodisc)
- Director (Cordless/Rykodisc)
- Matt Duke

== E ==
- Elf Power
- Brian Eno
- Roky Erickson (Restless/Rykodisc)
- Alejandro Escovedo
- Eskimo Joe

== F ==
- Fastball
- Lawrence Ferlinghetti
- Jeff Finlin
- Freezepop

== G ==
- Galaxie 500
- Thea Gilmore
- Gliss (Cordless/Rykodisc)
- Golden Smog
- Robert Gordon & Chris Spedding
- Meral Guneyman

== H ==
- Pete Ham
- Mickey Hart
- Miho Hatori
- Robert Hazard
- Jimi Hendrix
- Kristin Hersh
- Bill Hicks
- HUMANWINE (Cordless/Rykodisc)
- Will Hoge

== J ==
- Jihad Jerry & The Evildoers (Cordless/Rykodisc)
- Joe Jackson
- John Hegley
- John & Mary
- Evan Johns & the H-Bombs
- Jump with Joey
- Junior Senior
- Jupiter One (Cordless/Rykodisc)

== K ==
- Kennedy (Cordless/Rykodisc)
- Jack Kerouac
- Steve Kilbey
- James Kochalka Superstar
- Koishii & Hush (Cordless/Rykodisc)
- Peter Koppes

== L ==
- Ladytron
- Keith Levene's Violent Opposition]]
- Nils Lofgren
- Gary Louris
- Lucky Dube

== M ==
- Roger Joseph Manning, Jr. (Cordless/Rykodisc)
- Mahavishnu John McLaughlin
- Matthew
- Maven (Cordless/Rykodisc)
- Leslie Mendelson
- Ministry
- Mission of Burma
- Joey Molland
- Mono
- Mono Puff
- Morphine
- Mothers of Invention
- Bob Mould
- Mouth Music
- Misfits
- My Life with the Thrill Kill Kult
- Megan McCormick
- Keb Mo
- Allison Moorer
- Medeski, Martin & Wood

== N ==
- New Potato Caboose
- Nine Inch Nails (Speedo Rykodisc)
- Nickel Eye
- The Notorious MSG (Cordless/Rykodisc)

== O ==
- Yoko Ono
- Oranj Symphonette
- Osaka Popstar
- Mark Olson

== P ==
- Plan B (Cordless/Rykodisc)
- The Posies

== R ==
- The Residents (Cordless/Rykodisc)
- Raspberries
- Resurrecting the Champ
- Revolting Cocks
- Josh Rouse
- Rusty Truck

== S ==
- Sam & Ruby
- Seasick Steve
- Skye (Cordless/Rykodisc)
- The Soft Boys
- Soul Asylum
- Ringo Starr & His All-Starr Band
- The Storys
- Sugar
- Supreme Beings of Leisure
- Skerik's Syncopated Taint Septet (Rykodisc/Ropeadope)

== T ==
- The Takeover UK
- Throw The Fight (Cordless/Rykodisc)
- Throwing Muses
- Tin Hat
- James Jackson Toth
- John Trudell

== W ==
- Was (Not Was)
- Kelly Willis
- Wednesday 13
- Willard Grant Conspiracy
- Marty Willson-Piper
- Waltham
- Matt White

== X ==
- XrayOK (Cordless/Rykodisc)

== Y ==
- The Young Knives

== Z ==
- Frank Zappa
- Zillatron (Bootsy Collins)
- Martin Zellar
