= Cordless Recordings =

Netlabel owned by Warner Music Group

Cordless Recordings is a netlabel owned by Warner Music Group. The label was founded in 2005 by Jac Holzman, who also founded Elektra Records and Nonesuch Records.

== Affiliation with Rykodisc - present ==
In 2007, Warner Music Group's Rykodisc label formed a strategic alliance with Cordless Recordings. This alliance was meant to give Rykodisc a greater presence in the digital media space and the flexibility to explore new means of artist development and distribution strategies. As of 2009, current Cordless/Rykodisc artists included Gliss, The Notorious MSG, Throw the Fight and Kennedy.

== Artists on Cordless Recordings ==
First Wave (2005)
- Breakup Breakdown (2005 - 2006)
- Koishii & Hush (2005 - 2006)
- Dangerous Muse (2005 - 2006)

Second Wave (2006)

- Maven (2006)
- Roger Joseph Manning Jr. (2006)
- Plan B (2006)
- The Residents (2006)
- Skye (2006)
- Jihad Jerry & The Evildoers (2006)
- The Notorious MSG (2006)
- H.U.M.A.N.W.I.N.E. (2006 - 2007)
- Throw the Fight (2006, 2008)
- Kennedy (2006, 2009)
- Gliss (2006, 2009)

Third Wave (2007)

- The Dead Betties
- Freezepop (2007 - 2008)
- Jupiter One (2007 - 2008)

Fourth Wave (2008)

- The Callen Sisters (2008)
- Velvet Code (2008)

== See also ==
- Lists of record labels
