= Jupiter 1 =

Jupiter 1 or variant may refer to:

- Jupiter One, a U.S. rock band
  - Jupiter One (album), the eponymous 2008 album by the band Jupiter One
- Jupiter I, an early name for Io, a moon of Jupiter
- Brazil Straker Jupiter I, a variant of the Bristol Jupiter aircraft engine

== See also ==
- Jupiter (disambiguation)
