= Shunkashūtō =

Shunkashūtō (春夏秋冬; lit. "spring summer autumn winter") is a Japanese yojijukugo word meaning the four seasons of a year. It may also refer to:

- Shunkashūtō (Steady & Co. album), a 2001 album by Steady & Co
- Shunkashūtō (song), a 2009 song by Hilcrhyme
- Shunkashūtō (publication), a 1901 publication of poems centering on the works of Masaoka Shiki
