= Turn Up the Radio =

Turn Up the Radio may refer to:

- "Turn Up the Radio" (Autograph song)
- "Turn Up the Radio" (Madonna song)
- "Turn Up the Radio", a song by American rock band Die Trying from the album Die Trying
- "Turn Up the Radio", a song by American indie rock band Jupiter One from the album Jupiter One
- "Turn Up the Radio", a song by contemporary Christian music trio Phillips, Craig and Dean from the album Phillips, Craig & Dean
- "Turn Up the Radio", a song by American rock band The Rockets from the album The Rockets/No Ballads
- "Turn Up the Radio", a song by American rock band OK Go from the album Hungry Ghosts (album)
- "Turn Up the Radio", a song by American rock band Story of the Year released as a b-side from the single "Terrified" off the album The Black Swan
