= Nate Greenslit =

American musician, writer, and academic (born 1975)

- Born: Nathan Paul Greenslit; November 3, 1975; Greenfield, Massachusetts, United States
- Origin: Worcester, Massachusetts, United States
- Genres: Heavy metal, dark cabaret, steampunk, folk, folk punk, Middle Eastern music, oom-pah, punk rock, sociopolitical
- Occupations: Musician, writer, educator
- Instruments: Drums, percussion, guitar, synthesizer
- Years active: 2005–present
- Labels: Warner Music Group, independent
- Website: www.metasymptom.com

Nathan Greenslit (born November 3, 1975) is an American musician, writer, and academic.

== Early life ==
Greenslit was born in Greenfield, Massachusetts. He grew up in Worcester, Massachusetts. He began playing drums at age five, when his father gave him the Walberg and Auge drumset he had played in his own garage band as a teenager. Greenslit began taking drum lessons the following year. He continued with private lessons off and on until enrolling in 1993 at the New England Conservatory of Music (NEC) in their Contemporary Improvisation program.

== Music career ==
Greenslit dropped out of NEC in 1994 and did not perform again until 2005, when he joined a number of Boston-based bands, including H.U.M.A.N.W.I.N.E.; What Time Is It, Mr. Fox?; and Emperor Norton's Stationary Marching Band. Since then he has been a fixture of the Boston music scene, having performed and recorded with numerous projects.

HUMANWINE's music was distributed by Warner Music Group, and has received multiple Boston-area awards, including Best New Act in the 19th Annual Boston Music Awards 2006 and WBZTV's Best Local Album for Fighting Naked in 2007.

In 2010, Greenslit and marimbist Vessela Stoyanova co-founded Bury Me Standing. The band merges Stoyanova's Balkan folksong influences from growing up in Bulgaria with Greenslit's industrial and metal influences from growing up in the U.S. In 2014 they added Tunisian singer Yasmine Azaiez on vocals and violin, and Greenslit also began performing on guitar and synths.

== Academic and writing career ==
After leaving NEC, Greenslit pursued studies in a number of academic fields including philosophy and history of mathematics and science at St. John's College, cognitive science (psycholinguistics) at Johns Hopkins University, and the history and anthropology of science and technology at MIT, where he earned a PhD

Greenslit has held postdoctoral scholarships at the Media Lab at MIT and the History of Science Department at Harvard. He was also a visiting scholar in MIT's Initiative on Technology and Self.

He has since held faculty positions in the History of Science Department at Harvard University the Liberal Studies Program at the Boston Architectural College, and Liberal Arts at the Boston Conservatory of Music. Greenslit is currently also a visiting scholar in the Anthropology Department at New York University.

In addition to publishing in academic journals, Greenslit has published in more mainstream venues including The Atlantic Monthly, Wired, and The Baltimore Sun. His published writing has focused on neuroscience and society, and the political and cultural history of drugs.

Greenslit publishes occasional comedy writing as well, including writing for Cracked.

== Personal life ==
Greenslit has three daughters from a previous marriage. He lives with Vessela Stoyanova (MIDI marimba player, Berklee College of Music assistant professor, and cofounder of Bury Me Standing), at the Boston artists' collective Cloud Club.

In 2014 Greenslit launched the Lost Marbles Salon at Cloud Club, a series of themed events combining lecture-style presentations with music, performance art, short films, and art installations.

== Discography ==
=== Albums ===
- Bury Me Standing (self-titled debut) (2013)
- The Folks Below (self-titled debut) (2013)
- Little Bit of Blue – What Time Is It, Mr. Fox? (2013)
- Disco Dischordia – Emperor Norton's Stationary Marching Band (2012)
- The Lovebird's Throat – Clara Engel (2012)
- And Other Stories ... – What Time Is It, Mr. Fox? (2010)
- Steamship Killers – Walter Sickert & The Army of Broken Toys (2010)
- Did We Happen To Begin? – Super Time Pilot (2009)
- Fighting Naked – H.U.M.A.N.W.I.N.E. (February 26, 2008)
- No Time for Dreaming – Cabiria (2006)

=== EPs ===
- Wandering Shamelessly – Emperor Norton's Stationary Marching Band (2011)
- Mass Exodus – H.U.M.A.N.W.I.N.E. (2009)
- Rivolta Silenziosa – H.U.M.A.N.W.I.N.E. (2006)

=== Singles ===
- "Home", "Raze" – Bury Me Standing (2014)
- "August", "Repetitions", "Dirt Drop City" – Bury Me Standing (2013–2014)

== Publications ==
- "Facts, Fantasies, and New Online Sociopolitical Interpassivity", Fast Capitalism, November 1, 2014
- "Are psychedelics the next medical marijuana?", Baltimore Sun, August 5, 2014
- "LSD's Long, Strange Comeback", Zocalo Public Square, August 5, 2014
- "How Neuroscience Reinforces Racist Drug Policy", The Atlantic, June 12, 2014
- "Antidepressants and Advertising: Psychopharmaceuticals in Crisis", Yale Journal of Biology and Medicine, March, 2012
- Greenslit, Nate (February 28, 2012). "Op-Ed: Why YouTube Matters to the Science of Depression". Wired.
- "6 Most Badass Self-Inflicted Medical Experiments", Cracked, November 8, 2011
