= Four-character idiom =

Four-character idiom may refer to:

- Chengyu, a type of traditional Chinese idiomatic expressions, most of which consist of four characters, Structurally fixed idioms are composed of fixed components and structural forms and generally cannot be changed or morphemes added or subdivided at will.
- Sajaseong-eo, a Korean lexeme consisting of four hanja
- Yojijukugo, a Japanese lexeme consisting of four kanji
