= Armen Ra =

American artist

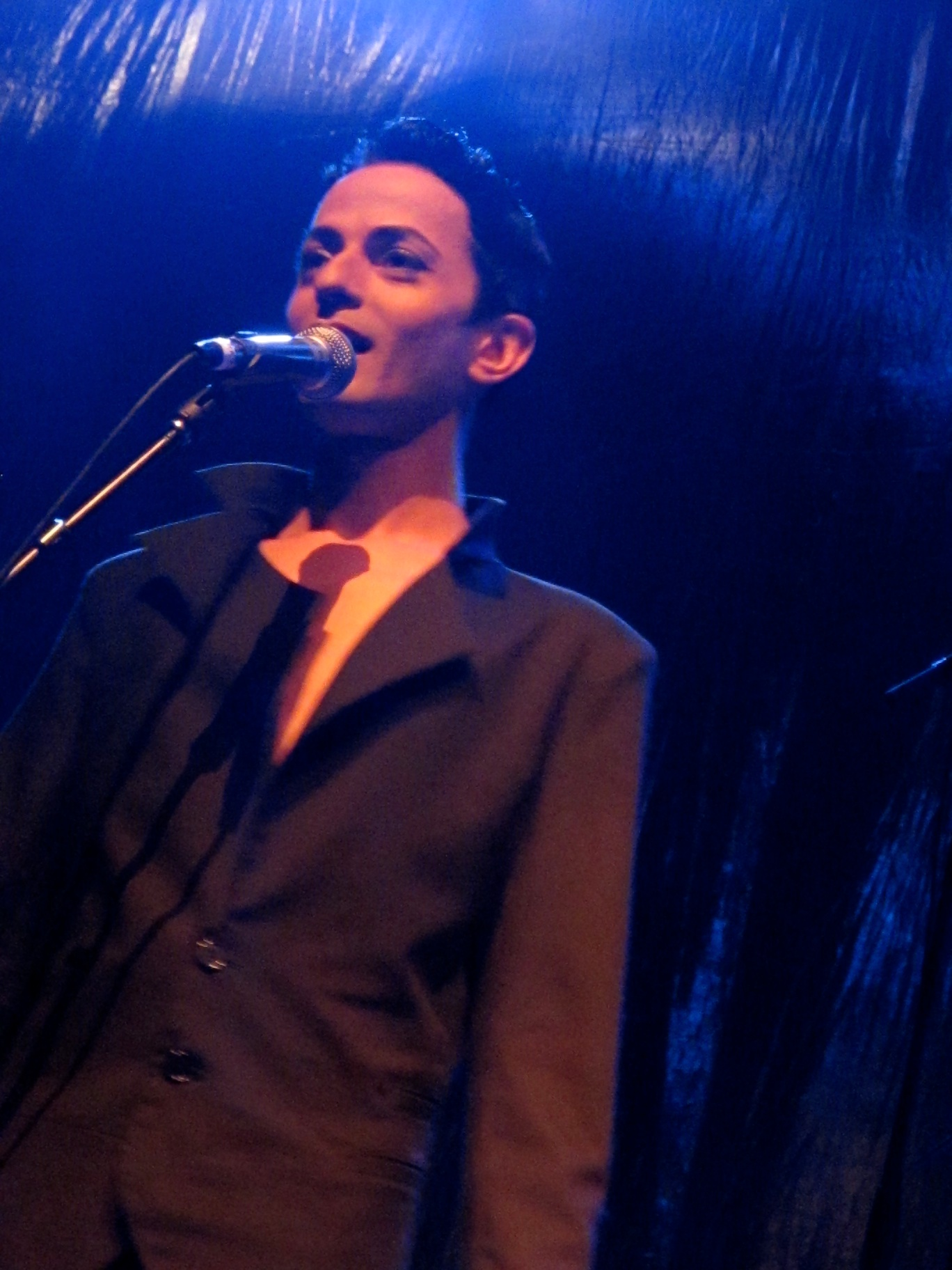
- Armen Ra at the House of Blues in Boston, Massachusetts

Background information
- Born: Armen Hovanesian; 1969 (age 55–56); Tehran, Iran
- Occupation: Thereminist

Armen Ra is an Iranian-Armenian artist, self-taught thereminist, production designer, director, and performer.

== Musical career ==
=== Career (2010-2013) ===
Ra began studying the theremin 2001, debuting with the orchestral group Antony & the Johnsons in New York City.

Ra has played at the United Nations, Wiener Konzerthaus Mozartsaal Vienna, CBGBs, Knitting Factory, La MaMa E.T.C., Joe's Pub, Boulder Museum of Modern Art, Lincoln Center, The Gershwin Hotel, B.B. King Museum, and Dietch Projects.

He has performed and recorded with various bands and on many projects (including a collaboration with British recording artist Marc Almond (of Soft Cell), on the song "My Madness & I" from his 2010 release Varieté). His debut solo CD Plays the Theremin (released on Bowl & Fork Records in 2010) showcases many classical Armenian laments and folk songs. Ra performed on the Sharon Needles album PG-13 on band Ministry's cover track "Everyday Is Halloween".

=== Career (2014-present) ===
In recent years, Ra has appeared in the following works:

- Armen plays on the Current 93 album entitled HoneySuckle Æons. He appears in multiple songs on this 2011 release.
- Armen plays on the debut album of Sharon Needles. The songs “Everyday Is Halloween” and “This Club Is a Haunted House” were released in 2013.
- In 2014, he played the theremin for Voltaire's album Raised by Bats.
- In 2015, he released Theremin Classique, a collection of European arias.
- Armen's recording of “Dle Yaman” was used for the video of designer Michael Schmidt’s 3-D gown in 2015.
- He was featured on Selena Gomez’s Revival on the track “Me and My Girls” in 2016
- He was featured on Gwen Stefani’s album on the track “Naughty” in 2016.
- He was featured on track 11 "Supernatural" of BØRNS' Blue Madonna

== Appearances in media ==
He has a cameo appearance in the film Party Monster. Other appearances in media include:

- Cameo as a desk clerk in Tomorrow Always Comes in 2006.
- Music for the short film Connect in 2010.
- Guest judge on the Logo Network show The Arrangement.
- Opener for Nick Cave & The Bad Seeds's Grinderman on their 2010 tour.
- Production designer for the 2012 horror movie Excision.
- Release of the documentary When My Sorrow Died: The Legend of Armen Ra & the Theremin.
- Music for the movie Hara Kiri in 2016.
- Promotional videos for electropop artist BØRNS, entitled "The Search for the Lost Sounds" and "The Faded Heart Sessions".

== Personal life ==
Armen Ra was born into an artistic Armenian family in Tehran. His grandmother, Arax Makarian, was a makeup artist. His mother, Ruzanna Makarian-Hovanesian, was a pianist. His aunt, Shake Makarian Vartanian, was a soloist in the Iranian opera, which allowed him at a young age to visit the opera frequently.

Armen's father was an Operations Manager for Iran Air which allowed the family to travel internationally annually. At the commencement of the Iranian Revolution the family was traveling in the United States and did not return to Iran.

Armen Ra is gay.
