= Hi-hat =

Percussion instrument

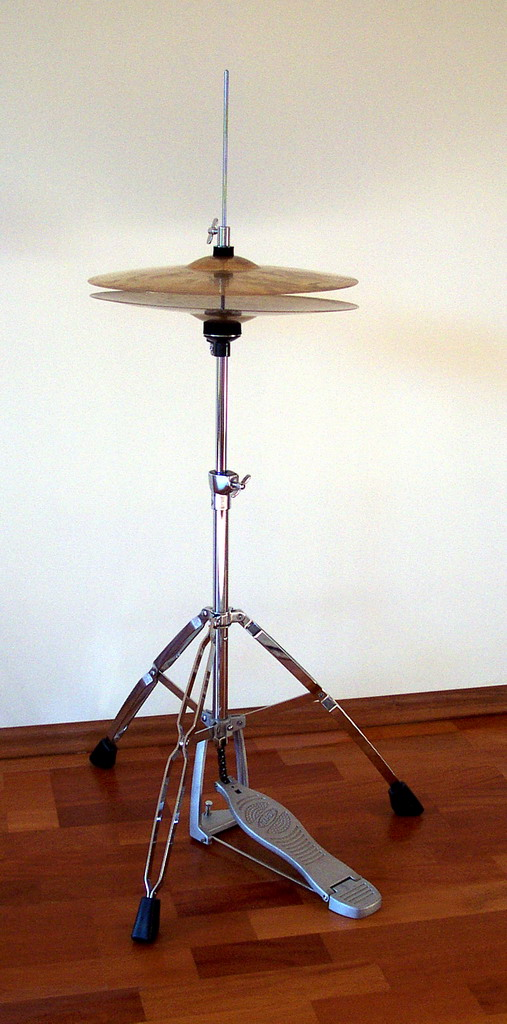
- A hi-hat beside a wall

Percussion instrument
- Other names: High-hat, Hihat
- Classification: Idiophone
- Hornbostel–Sachs classification: 111.24 (Percussion vessels)
- Inventor: Walberg and Auge Drum Company
- Developed: 1920s

A hi-hat, hihat, or high-hat is a combination of two cymbals and a pedal, all mounted on a metal stand. It is a part of the standard drum kit used by drummers in many styles of music including rock, pop, jazz, and blues. Hi-hats consist of a matching pair of small to medium-sized cymbals mounted on a stand, with the two cymbals facing each other. The bottom cymbal is fixed and the top is mounted on a rod which moves the top cymbal toward the bottom one when the pedal is depressed (a hi-hat that is in this position is said to be "closed" or "closed hi-hats").

The cymbals may be played by closing them together with the pedal, which creates a "chck" sound or striking them with a stick, which may be done with them open, closed, open and then closed after striking to dampen the ring, or closed and then opened to create a shimmering effect at the end of the note. Depending on how hard a hi-hat is struck and whether it is "open" (i.e., pedal not pressed, so the two cymbals are not closed together), a hi-hat can produce a range of dynamics, from very quiet "chck" (or "chick") sounds, done with merely gently pressing the pedal—this is suitable for soft accompaniment during a ballad or the start of a guitar solo—to very loud (e.g. striking fully open hats hard with sticks, a technique used in loud heavy metal songs).

While the term hi-hat normally refers to the entire setup (two cymbals, stand, pedal, rod mechanism), in some cases, drummers use it to refer exclusively to the two cymbals themselves.

== Description ==
The hi-hat has two cymbals, which are typically between 13–15 inches (33–38 centimetres). They are mounted on a stand, which is linked to a pedal operated by the user's foot so the upper cymbal can move up and down.

Standard terminology has evolved. Open and closed hi-hat refer to notes struck while the two cymbals are apart or together (open or closed), while pedal hi-hat refers to parts or notes played solely with the pedal used to strike the two cymbals. Most cymbal patterns consist of both open and closed notes.

=== Clutch ===
The standard clutch uses a knurled collar partially threaded below the cymbal and a pair of knurled rings above it. The collar is tightened against the end of the thread, while the rings are tightened against each other. Drop-clutches are also used to lock and release hi-hats while both feet are in use playing double bass drums.

== History ==
Initial versions of the hi-hat were called clangers, which were small cymbals mounted onto a bass drum rim and struck with an arm on the bass drum pedal. Then came shoes, which were two hinged boards with cymbals on the ends that were clashed together. A standard size was 10 inches (25 cm), some with heavy bells up to 5 inches (13 cm) wide. These would evolve into the "Low-sock" or "Low-boy", a device that had a rod that went through the lower cymbal and had a pedal attached to actuate the cymbals; this is the most direct ancestor of the modern hi-hat.

Hi-hats that were raised and could be played by hand as well as foot may have been developed around 1926 by Barney Walberg of the drum accessory company Walberg and Auge. The first recognized master of the new instrument was "Papa" Jo Jones, whose playing of timekeeping "ride" rhythms while striking the hi-hat as it opened and closed inspired the innovation of the ride cymbal. The editor of the 2008 Jazz Profiles article made specific mention of others who are thought to have invented the hi-hat, including Papa Jo Jones and Kaiser Marshall. A 2013 Modern Drummer article credits Papa Jo Jones with being the first to use brushes on drums and shifting time keeping from the bass drum to the hi-hat (providing a "swing-pulse focus").

== Use ==
When struck closed or played with the pedal, the hi-hat gives a short, crisp, muted percussive sound, referred to as a "chick". Adjusting the gap between the cymbals can alter the sound of the open hi-hat from a shimmering, sustained tone to something similar to a ride cymbal. When struck with a drumstick, the cymbals make either a short, snappy sound or a longer sustaining sandy sound depending on the position of the pedal.

It can also be played just by lifting and lowering the foot to clash the cymbals together, a style commonly used to accent beats 2 and 4 in jazz music. In rock music, the hi-hats are commonly struck every beat, or on beats 1 and 3, while the cymbals are held together. The drummer can control the sound by foot pressure. Less pressure allows the cymbals to rub together more freely, giving both greater sustain and greater volume for accent or crescendo. In shuffle time, a rhythm known as cooking is often employed. To produce this the cymbals are struck twice in rapid succession, being held closed on the first stroke and allowed to open just before the second, then allowed to ring before being closed with a chick to complete the pattern (the cymbals may or may not be struck on the chick).

In much hip-hop, the hi-hat is hit with drumsticks in a simple eighth-note pattern, although this playing is usually done by a drum machine or from an old recording from which the sound of a hi-hat is recorded and loaded into a sampler or similar recording-enabled equipment from which it is triggered.

Closed hi-hat

Open hi-hat

Hi-hat being opened and closed by its pedal
