= Jupiter One (album) =

Studio album by Jupiter One
- Released: 2007
- Genre: Indie rock, synthpop
- Label: Cordless Recordings
- Producer: Jupiter One Music Inc

Jupiter One chronology
Magical Mountain and the Floating Hospital (2006)	Jupiter One (2007)	Sunshower (2009)

Jupiter One is the self-titled album by American indie rock band Jupiter One. The album was re-released in 2008, which included two more tracks, "Umbrellas" and "Summer Song". Several tracks from the album have been used in Electronic Arts video games. "Countdown" was featured in Madden NFL 08, "Unglued" in FIFA 08, "Turn Up The Radio" in NHL 08, Platform Moon" in FIFA 09, and "Fire Away" in Burnout Paradise.

== Track listing ==
No.	Title	Writer(s)	Length
1.	"Intro for Ani Enorda"	K Ishibashi	1:10
2.	"Countdown"	K Ishibashi	3:48
3.	"Moon Won't Turn"	Zac Colwell	4:33
4.	"Unglued"	Zac Colwell; K Ishibashi	5:07
5.	"Mystery Man"	K Ishibashi	4:47
6.	"Turn Up the Radio"	K Ishibashi; Keiko Ishibashi	3:57
7.	"Platform Moon"	Zac Colwell	5:44
8.	"Wrong Line"	K Ishibashi	4:39
9.	"Fire Away"	Zac Colwell; K Ishibashi	3:26
10.	"Kamikaze Pilots"	Zac Colwell	5:06
11.	"Way to the Floating Hospital"	Zac Colwell; K Ishibashi	4:33

2008 re-release

No.	Title	Writer(s)	Length
12.	"Umbrellas"	Zac Colwell	5:56
13.	"Summer Song"	Zac Colwell; K Ishibashi	5:26
