= Throw the Fight =

American rock band

- Also known as: TTF
- Origin: Minneapolis, Minnesota, U.S.
- Genres: Alternative rock; alternative metal; post-hardcore; melodic metalcore
- Years active: 2003–present
- Labels: Cordless (2006–2012); Bullet Tooth Records (2012 – 2021); Long Branch Records (2021-current)
- Members: Ryan Baustert; Kris Weiser; Kade Kastelitz; Alex Sullivan
- Website: throwthefight.com

Throw the Fight is an American rock band originating from Minneapolis, Minnesota.

== History ==
=== The Fire Within ===
Throw the Fight started out as a five-piece group in Minneapolis, Minnesota. The band recorded several demos and an eponymous three song EP with lead vocalist Brandon Kyllo. Years later, Paul Kreuger replaced Brandon as the band's vocalist and, collaboratively, the group began writing and recording their next EP, The Fire Within. While still recording their EP, which consisted of four tracks, Throw the Fight was voted as one of the Top Ten Unsigned Bands in the country by Alternative Press in 2006. Shortly after, Throw the Fight signed with Cordless Recordings – a digital label that is part of the Warner Music Group. With the widespread attention provided by the article and after garnering a larger fanbase, the band collectively decided to begin touring in support of the newly recorded EP. After a year and a half of touring, a lineup change occurred as James Clark replaced Paul who provided vocals for the band. Though previously a fundamentally sound musical group, Throw the Fight believed James fit in perfectly with the band's overall style and his sound better reflected the desired tone of the band. The new front man provided a new sound for the band, one that attracted Minnesota producer Matt Kirkwold.

=== In Pursuit of Tomorrow ===
With moderate mainstream acclaim from the EP, Throw the Fight continued to write and record songs for their first album. Receiving mostly positive reviews, In Pursuit of Tomorrow carried musical range from intense, screaming guitar melodies to classic metal to melancholy tones. Throw the Fight, mainly concerned with their impression on their following, felt they had to stay true to their fan base with their first true album. Attributing their success mainly to a particular "X Factor" unseen in other acts, they have also admitted that unity and teamwork within the band have aided in their accomplishments. They are currently in the studio writing and tracking new material for their second album.

Throw the Fight announced on April 11, 2011, that John Feldmann (Story of the Year, The Used, Atreyu) will be producing the band's second album.

=== Throw the Fight sign to Bullet Tooth Records / What Doesn't Kill Us ===
The band announced a new label partnership with Josh Grabelle and his label, Bullet Tooth Records, on March 26, 2012. The label will release their next album, What Doesn't Kill Us, on June 26, 2012.

They released a B-side EP called The Vault in 2013.

In 2015, after a brief hiatus, they added three new members and recorded their follow up to What Doesn't Kill Us. It is set for a spring release through Bullet Tooth Records.

=== Transmissions and departure of James Clark ===
The band released their third full-length Transmissions on April 8, 2016. Guitarist Brandt Jorgensen left the band shortly after the album's release. Bassist Kade Kastelitz also took on the role of becoming a second vocalist in the band.

On October 3, 2019, the band announced that James Clark would be leaving the band on good terms to focus on Kill the Lights full time and Kade would be the frontman going forward.

== Members ==
- Ryan Baustert – guitar
- Kris Weiser – guitar
- Kade Kastelitz – vocals
- Alex Sullivan – drums

== Touring and album sales ==
As a group, Throw the Fight toured across the United States independently before joining a major tour circuit. Throw the Fight then became a part of the Warped Tour 2007 and performed July 13–22. The band also participated in the 2008 Taste of Chaos tour, namely the St. Paul stop of the tour, which took place on March 4. Throw the Fight toured alongside Drowning Pool in full support of their album In Pursuit of Tomorrow. The band has toured and shared stages with other national acts such as Avenged Sevenfold, Papa Roach, Buckcherry, Staind, Chevelle, Lostprophets, A Change of Pace, among many others.

On June 7, 2009, group vocalist James Clark was diagnosed with testicular cancer. Several tour dates were canceled while he was undergoing treatment. He has since made a full recovery.

Most recently, Throw the Fight supported their Bullet Tooth release, "What Doesn't Kill Us", by touring with Red Jumpsuit Apparatus, Nonpoint, 3 Years Hollow, and others.

The band toured with Bullet for my Valentine, Black Veil Brides, and Stars in Stereo on the Monster Energy Outbreak Tour from September 25 through November 4, 2013.

== Discography ==
=== Studio albums ===
- In Pursuit of Tomorrow (2008)
- What Doesn't Kill Us (2012)
- Transmissions (2016)
- Settle Your Sins (2020)
- Strangeworld (2023)

=== EPs and singles ===
- Throw the Fight (2003) (EP)
- The Fire Within (2006) (EP)
- The Vault (2013) (EP)
- "Not So Hollywood (Pete Rage Remix)" (2013) (single)
