= Jupiter One =

American indie rock band

- Origin: Brooklyn, New York, USA
- Genres: Indie rock, electronic rock, new wave
- Years active: 2003–2013
- Label: Cordless Recordings
- Members: Kaoru Ishibashi; Zac Colwell; Mocha; David Heilman; Pat "Panda" Dougherty
- Past members: Mark Guiliana; Neal Persiani; Ben Wright

Jupiter One was an American indie rock band from Brooklyn, New York, formed in 2003. Inspired by a wide range of influences, they create upbeat indie pop songs, with a grounding in futuristic-sounding new wave-style synth sounds. Their self-titled and self-released debut album was distributed by Cordless Recordings in 2007, following another release of the album in 2008 under the Cordless Recordings label. The album Sunshower followed in 2009. Their music is featured in several videogames such as Madden NFL 08, NHL 08, Fifa 08, Fifa 09, and Burnout Paradise.

== Band history ==
Kaoru Ishibashi and Zac Colwell are the founding members of the group. Other members are Ishibashi's wife Mocha, a Japanese-born keyboardist and violinist, drummer Dave Heilman, and bassist Pat "Panda" Dougherty. Ishibashi also performs in of Montreal, Regina Spektor's touring band, and a solo project, Kishi Bashi.

Ishibashi and Colwell first met while travelling musicians in the orchestra of Barnum's Kaleidoscape. After the circus tour ended they spent time in Zac's hometown of Austin before moving to New York in 2003, where Jupiter One would officially form. In New York, Ishibashi re-connected with then-girlfriend Mocha, a Japanese-born keyboardist and fellow violinist who also joined the group. Drummer Dave Heilman and bassist Pat "Panda" Dougherty later joined the band.

The band is named after the spaceship in the '60s television show Lost in Space.

== Releases and performances ==
Many of their tracks have been used in Electronic Arts video games. "Countdown" has been featured in Madden NFL 08, while "Turn Up the Radio" featured in NHL 08, "Fire Away" featured in Burnout Paradise, and "Unglued" featured in FIFA 08. The track "Platform Moon" was used in a commercial for Mazda cars outside of the US and in FIFA 09.

In 2008 their track "Countdown" was played during the pre-episode of Heroes Season 3 on NBC, and Kyle XY season 2 on ABC. It was also featured in commercials for Payless and MLB Network.

They opened for Regina Spektor on her 2009 North American tour. They also opened for Spektor on her 2010 Australasian tour.

== Third studio album and side projects ==
The band began working on many separate projects after the release of Sunshower. In late 2011, the band got together to talk about some new ideas for their third studio album. Though many good ideas were thrown around, other current projects would have delayed any work on this album until late 2012 at the earliest. Ishibashi started a solo project known as Kishi Bashi in 2011. He put out a solo EP called Room For Dream in mid-2011 and in 2012 released his first LP 151a on the Joyful Noise label. His second album Lighght followed in 2014. Dave, Zac and Panda also formed a side project called Fancy Colors. They released their debut album Near Equator in September 2012, and their sophomore LP Island of the Dead in June 2014. In 2014, Ishibashi was interviewed by Roy Wallace and Zeke Fritts at the House of Blues in Dallas, Texas, commenting that Jupiter One "was in the past."

== Discography ==
=== Albums ===
- Jupiter One EP (2005)
- Magical Mountain and the Floating Hospital (Limited edition self-release) (2006)
- Jupiter One (2007) (Limited edition self-release)
- Jupiter One (2008)
- The Remix EP (2008)
- Sunshower (2009)

=== Singles ===
- "Countdown"/"Wrong Line"/"Turn Up the Radio" (promo single) (2006)
- "Flaming Arrow" (2009)

== Members ==
- Kishi Bashi – vocals, guitar, keyboards, violin
- Zac Colwell – vocals, guitar, keyboards, flute
- Mocha – vocals, keyboards, violin
- David Heilman – drums
- Pat "Panda" Dougherty - bass

=== Former members ===
- Mark Guiliana – drums
- Neal Persiani – bass
- Ben Wright – bass
