= Shunkashūtō (Steady & Co. song) =

"Shun-Ka-Shū-Tō (春夏秋冬)"

Single by Steady & Co.

from the album Chambers
- B-side: "Kazemakase" & "Fall Time Flow"
- Released: October 24, 2001
- Genre: Rock
- Label: Warner Music

Steady & Co. singles chronology
"Stay Gold" (2001)	"Shun-Ka-Shū-Tō (春夏秋冬)" (2001)	"Only Holy Story" (2001)

"Shun-Ka-Shū-Tō" (春夏秋冬) is the second single by Japanese group Steady & Co.; released in 2001. The name comes from a Japanese yojijukugo term that means "spring, summer, autumn, and winter".

"Shun-Ka-Shū-Tō" sampled from "Natsu No Iro wo Sagashi-ni" (夏の色を探しに) by a Japanese Band called Air.

== Track listing ==
1. "Shun-Ka-Shū-Tō" (春夏秋冬) – 4:17
2. "Kazemakase" (風まかせ) – 3:44
3. "Fall Time Flow" – 4:24
