= God Save Our Young Blood =

2018 song by Børns

Single by Børns and Lana Del Rey

from the album Blue Madonna
- Released: 2 January 2018
- Recorded: 2017
- Length: 3:52 (digital single); 4:19 (standard CD)
- Label: Interscope
- Songwriters: Børns; Thomas Schleiter
- Producer: Tommy English

Lana Del Rey singles chronology
"Groupie Love" (2017)	"God Save Our Young Blood" (2018)	"Woman" (2018)

Licensed audio
- "God Save Our Young Blood" on YouTube

"God Save Our Young Blood" is a song by American recording artist Børns featuring the vocals of American singer-songwriter Lana Del Rey. The song was produced by Tommy English and written by Børns and Thomas Schleiter. The song was their second collaboration on the album and was later released as the fourth single off the record.

== Release ==
On October 9, 2017, Børns shared a video of Del Rey in the studio with him, leading fans to speculate that she would be featured on his upcoming album. After an announcement, the song was officially released as a single, after premiering through Beats 1 Radio on January 2, 2018.

== Critical reception ==
The song received generally positive reviews. Chris DeVille of Yahoo wrote "Consider this song the 2018 version of the Postal Service, a cocktail of festival-friendly sounds that merges indie-pop precociousness with trap drums and EDM’s grand, surging sweep", adding on that "I can imagine “God Save Our Young Blood” becoming a big hit, but I wish Del Rey's presence on the track was more substantial; she is audible throughout, but in what amounts to a background vocalist role. Listen for yourself." Chris Deverell of Baeble Music wrote that the vocalists were "delivering good will and good tunes to the world in their new collab track", further commenting that "anthemic, a bombastic alt-pop track that breathes summertime vibes into the dark and frozen times we're currently living in", praising Børns' production and Lana's vocals. Kyle Munzenrieder of W dubbed the sung as "the first big eco-friendly jam of 2018" and noted how the song's themes of "Youth, ruined paradise, biblical allusions, lyrics about car headlights and coastlines, wispy ruminations on love [make it so] you can totally see why he invited Del Rey to jump on the song as his duet partner. It's right up her alley." Lizzie Maqnno of Paste praised the "minimal beats and synths as their smooth pop vocals perfectly intertwine and sing of a summer drive to watch the sunrise."

Complex included the track on their "Best Songs of the Month" ranking, writing that "Lana Del Rey's contribution to the indie-pop slow-burner enhances the dreamy factor as she lustfully emphasizes words like "damnnnn" and "heyyyy" to build up to the sing-whispery chorus, where she and BØRNS make a plea to the big homie up in the sky." Kirsten Spruch of Baeble Music honored the song as her site's "Song of the Day", adding that the reason being was that "Their voices take turns fading in and out over a bed of soft, cloudy synths. The chorus, while still pretty tame, sounds like the new anthem for teens all around the world." Billboard would later include the song in their list of Lana Del Rey's "Best Collabs".

== Charts ==
Chart (2018)	Peak position
Czech Republic Modern Rock (IFPI)	6
US Rock Songs	17
