= 151a =

Studio album by Kishi Bashi
- Released: April 10, 2012
- Recorded: 2011–2012
- Studio: Home Studios, Norfolk, Virginia
- Genre: Indie pop
- Length: 34:16
- Label: Joyful Noise
- Producer: Kaoru Ishibashi

Kishi Bashi chronology
151a (2012)	Lighght (2014)

151a is the first studio album by indie pop artist Kishi Bashi. The album, whose title resembles the Japanese expression ichi-go ichi-e, meaning one time, one place, was released on April 10, 2012. 151a, similar to Kishi Bashi's second studio album, Lighght, was produced by Kishi Bashi and was recorded in various locations, though most recording took place at Home Studios in Norfolk, Virginia.

In July 2021, the song "I Am the Antichrist to You" was featured in the fifth season of the animated television series Rick and Morty.

== Music ==
Professional ratings
Aggregate scores
Source	Rating
Metacritic	77/100
Review scores
Source	Rating
AllMusic	3.5/5 stars

The music on 151a has been compared to Animal Collective, Owen Pallett, Andrew Bird, Blitzen Trapper, and Kishi Bashi's former band Of Montreal. It features lyrics in both English and Japanese.

Bright Whites was named one of NPR Music's 100 Favorite Songs of 2012, and was featured in a commercial for Windows 8.

== Critical reception ==
151a was released to critical acclaim, receiving a score of 77 of 100 from Metacritic based on 7 reviews. James Christopher Monger of AllMusic spoke of 151a as "a trippy, intensely melodic set of nine cosmic chamber rock songs."

== Track listing ==
All tracks are written by Kishi Bashi.

No.	Title	Length
1.	"Intro / Pathos, Pathos"	3:57
2.	"Manchester"	4:06
3.	"Bright Whites"	4:12
4.	"It All Began With a Burst"	3:02
5.	"Wonder Woman, Wonder Me"	3:19
6.	"Chester's Burst Over the Hamptons"	1:49
7.	"Atticus, In the Desert"	4:18
8.	"I Am the Antichrist to You"	3:56
9.	"Beat the Bright Out of Me"	5:37
Total length:		34:16
