= Kishi Bashi =

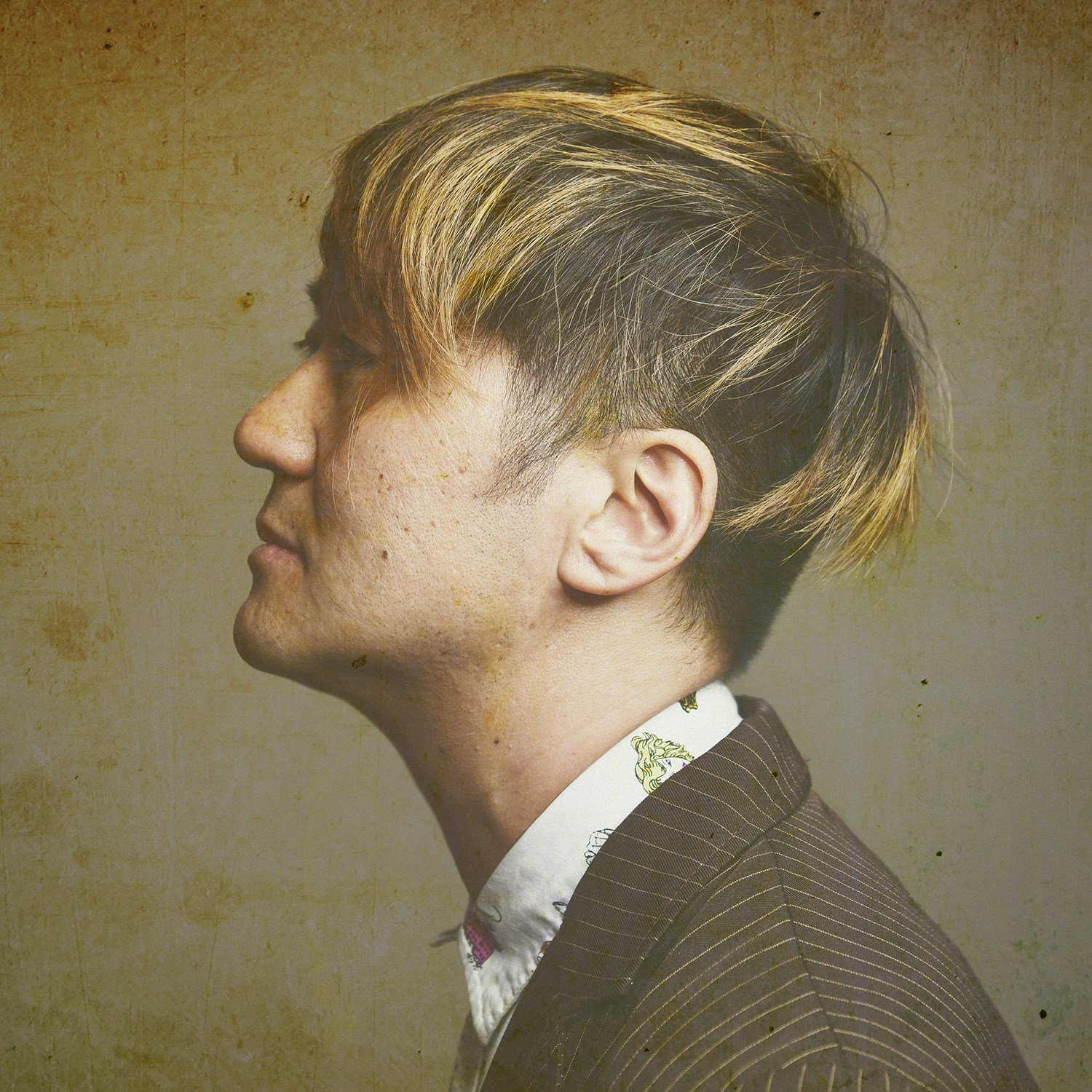
- Kishi Bashi in 2012

Background information
- Born: Kaoru Ishibashi; 4 November 1975 (age 50)
- Origin: Seattle, Washington / Norfolk, Virginia, U.S.
- Genres: Indie pop; indie rock; psychedelic pop; electronic; experimental
- Occupations: Singer; musician; songwriter
- Instruments: Vocals; guitar; violin; keyboards; beatboxing; whistling
- Labels: Joyful Noise Recordings; Universal D
- Spouse: Keiko Ishibashi (m. 2002–2021) Kimberly Dill-Ishibashi (m. 2024)
- Website: www.kishibashi.com

Kaoru Dill-Ishibashi (born November 4, 1975), who performs as Kishi Bashi, is an American singer-songwriter and filmmaker currently based in Santa Cruz, California.

He was a founding member of Jupiter One and, for a few years, was a member of the band of Montreal. He embarked on his career as a solo artist in 2011, releasing his debut album 151a at Joyful Noise Recordings in 2012.

== Biography ==
Born in Seattle, Washington, Bashi grew up in Norfolk, Virginia where both of his parents were professors at Old Dominion University. His mother is from Naha, Okinawa Prefecture, and his father is from Iga, Mie Prefecture. After graduating from Matthew Fontaine Maury High School in 1994, he went to Cornell University College of Engineering. At Cornell he co-founded a band named Tamarisk. After flunking out of Cornell, he went to study film scoring at Berklee College of Music before becoming a violinist.

In 2002, he married violinist Keiko Ishibashi. After 19 years of marriage, they finalized their divorce in early 2021. Kishi Bashi began dating American philosopher and professor Kimberly Dill in August 2021. As of January 2023, Ishibashi and Dill were engaged. In July 2024, Ishibashi and Dill married in a private ceremony in California's Sierra Nevada mountains.

Kishi Bashi is also the singer and founding member of the New York electronic rock outfit, Jupiter One. In 2011, he started to record and perform as a solo artist, recorded and toured internationally as a violinist with diverse artists such as Regina Spektor, opening for Sondre Lerche, Alexi Murdoch, and of Montreal. He supported of Montreal on their spring 2012 tour.

Shortly after Dill-Ishibashi debuted his full-length solo album 151a on Indianapolis label Joyful Noise Recordings, NPR All Songs Considered host Bob Boilen listed Kishi Bashi as his favorite new artist of 2012 noting that he created "a radiant, uplifting soundscape" with songs such as "Bright Whites."

In 2014 Kishi Bashi released his own line of coffee through Jittery Joe's called Royal Daark Blend. Each purchase comes with an exclusive song download.

Kishi Bashi's songs are frequently used in other media. His music also appears in Banana Split, The Babysitter's Club, God Friended Me, Into The Dark, Atypical, the DC Universe's Titans series, and others. He composed the soundtrack for the Apple TV+ series Stillwater, and wrote the theme song to the television series Shrill. In July 2021, Kishi Bashi's song "I Am the Antichrist to You" was featured in season 5 episode 3 "A Rickconvenient Mort" of the animated television series Rick and Morty.

== Discography ==
=== Studio albums ===
List of albums, with selected chart positions
Title	Album details	Peak chart positions		
Title	Album details	US	US Indie	US Rock
151a	Released: April 10, 2012; Label: Joyful Noise	— (Note: 151a did not enter the US Billboard 200, but peaked at number six on the Top Heatseekers Albums Chart.)	47	—
Lighght	Released: May 13, 2014; Label: Joyful Noise	53	11	13
Sonderlust	Released: September 16, 2016; Label: Joyful Noise	153	17	19
Omoiyari	Released: May 31, 2019; Label: Joyful Noise	— (Note: Omoiyari did not enter the US Billboard 200, but peaked at number 39 on the US Album Sales Chart.)	10	—
Kantos	Released: 23 August 2024; Label: Joyful Noise	—	—	—
"—" denotes a recording that did not chart or was not released in that territory.

=== Live albums ===
List of albums, with selected chart positions
Title	Album details	Peak chart positions	
Title	Album details	US	US Indie
Live on Valentine's	Released: February 14, 2014; Label: Joyful Noise	—	—
String Quartet Live!	Released: November 13, 2015; Label: Joyful Noise	— (Note: String Quartet Live! did not enter the US Billboard 200, but peaked at number seven on the Vinyl Albums Chart.)	37
"—" denotes a recording that did not chart or was not released in that territory.

=== Compilation albums ===
- "7" Box Set" (including covers of Talking Heads, ELO, and Beirut) (2013) – Joyful Noise

=== Extended plays ===
- Room for Dream EP (2011) – Aerobic International / Joyful Noise
- Philosophize! Chemicalize! EP (2013) – Joyful Noise
- Room for Dream EP (2017) – Joyful Noise
- Emigrant EP (2021) – Joyful Noise

=== Soundtracks ===
- Stillwater: Vol. I (Apple TV+ Original Series Soundtrack) (2020) – Joyful Noise
- The Fourth Phase (2016)

== Projects ==
Kishi Bashi's first EP, Room For Dream, came out in May 2011 on Aerobic International. Room For Dream features four songs, including a duet with Kevin Barnes and can only be purchased from downloading platforms such as iTunes or Bandcamp.

His live show is a solo performance based on live violin and vocal looping, whistling, and beat boxing. He has often been compared to Andrew Bird and Owen Pallett. Kishi Bashi's first full-length record, 151a, was released by Joyful Noise Recordings on April 10, 2012, after receiving partial funding through Kickstarter. The title '151a' refers to the Japanese term 一期一会 (pronounced the same way '151a' is in Japanese), which carries a meaning similar to "once in a lifetime". The three b-sides from the Room For Dream EP ("Conversations at the End of the World," "Evalyn, Summer has Arrived," and "Unicorns Die When You Leave") are included on the Australian/NZ edition of '151a' as bonus tracks. The Australian/NZ edition also replaces "Intro / Pathos, Pathos" with an instrumental version of the same track.

Kishi Bashi's second album, Lighght (pronounced "light") was released on Joyful Noise Recordings on May 13, 2014. The album's title is a one-word poem by Aram Saroyan.

His third studio album, Sonderlust, was released on September 16, 2016, by Joyful Noise Recordings. It was produced by Chris Taylor of Grizzly Bear.

On December 7, 2017, Dill-Ishibashi started a crowdfunding campaign on Indiegogo for a documentary film titled Omoiyari: A Songfilm by Kishi Bashi, which was acquired by MTV Documentaries and premiered on Paramount+ in 2023. The film details the struggles faced by incarcerated Japanese Americans during World War II. An album of songs created for the film was released by Joyful Noise Recordings on May 31, 2019, marking it as his fourth studio album.
