= Gliss (band) =

Danish/American band

Gliss are a Danish/American duo currently splitting time between Berlin, Los Angeles and Copenhagen. The band consists of Victoria Cecilia (vocal, bass, programming, synths), Martin Klingman (vocals, guitar, drums, bass) and formerly David Reiss (guitar, bass).

== Kick in Your Heart ==
Their first album " Kick in Your Heart" was discovered by Billy Corgan, who brought them to Europe to support his solo tour " Future Embrace". Following the tour he asked the band to be part of a Smashing Pumpkins tribute album, featuring bands such as Panic! at the Disco, Deftones and The Bravery. In 2007 he again asked the band to support him, this time for the re-formation of Smashing Pumpkins.

== Love the Virgins ==
Their debut album Love the Virgins, was released in 2007 on UK label Tough Cookie. The single "Blue Sky" was the winner of "Fresh Meat" on Zane Lowe's BBC Radio 1 show. This led to European support slots for Gliss with BRMC and Editors. Gliss released their album "Love The Virgins" in November 2006, following a UK tour with Orson. At one point, the tour was put in jeopardy when Gliss performed naked and subsequently featured in The Daily Star. The band guest starred in an episode of Night Calls with pornstar Jesse Jane on Playboy TV, after their infamous UK tour. The track "Huh, What?" was featured in the MasterCard Priceless commercial "Vintage".

== Devotion Implosion ==
Their second album Devotion Implosion was released in 2009 on Cordless/Rykodisc and was produced by the band themselves and mixed by Gareth Jones, (who has worked with Depeche Mode, Liars, Wire, Nick Cave and These New Puritans). The single "Gimme the Hit" was featured on MTV Subterranean. The band also did an in-studio performance on KCRW's Morning Becomes Eclectic and were featured on Yahoo TV's The New Now following their national tour with The Warlocks, and in-studio performance and interview on Seattle's KEXP. In 2009 the band did an In-studio interview on NME radio in London and Motor FM in Berlin during their tour with British band The Horrors. The band is currently working on their 3rd album to be titled "Le Debut", which is a complete departure from their previous releases. Most recently Gliss toured the US with Scottish band Glasvegas and shortly thereafter landed a worldwide ad campaign for Calvin Klein's "Forbidden Euphoria".

== Langsom Dans ==
Gliss completed recording the follow-up to Devotion Implosion in Los Angeles. It was mixed by Michael Patterson (Trent Reznor/NIN, Beck, Ladytron) and mastered by Henrik Jonsson (Lykke Li, The Knife). Experimenting with new sonics, atmospheres and voices, the album was described by KEXP as a collection of dreamy, melancholic pop songs. The album was released on January 22, 2013, via Modern Outsider.

== Pale Reflections ==
Pale Reflections was released June 26, 2015. Carrying on after the 2013 departure of guitarist David Reiss, the duo of Victoria Cecilia and Martin Klingman released the album titled “Pale Reflections.” Cecilia emerged as the main voice of the band on this 2013 album. Martin Klingman and Victoria Cecilia had been dividing their time between Los Angeles and Berlin, and the record was described as a reflection of the creative underbelly of both cities, with the first single "Mirrored" diving deep into ethereal electronica. Recorded in Los Angeles and Berlin, the 10-track album is a contrasting blend of dirt and dreamy pop melodies, bringing to mind Beach House and The Kills. After the release, the band had the honor of performing for the Danish royal family along with The Raveonettes.The album was mixed by Victoria Cecilia, and released on the duo's own label Kraftwööd Musik Fabrik.

== Strange Heaven ==
Released February 9, 2018, the 10-track album features heavy distortion and ethereal vocals. Strange Heaven is a contrasting blend of dirty post-punk hooks and dreamy pop melodies, bringing to mind Joy Division and Dum Dum Girls.The album was mixed by Victoria Cecilia, and released on the duo's own label Kraftwööd Musik Fabrik. The album has been described as Ethereal, nocturnal and bristling with detachment.

== Discography ==
- Kick in Your Heart EP (2005)
- Love the Virgins (2006)
- Devotion Implosion (2009)
- Devoted and Imploded (2011)
- Kissing the Boulevard (2011)
- Langsom Dans (2013)
- Pale Reflections (2015)
- Strange Heaven (2018)
