= Lighght (album) =

Studio album by Kishi Bashi
- Released: May 13, 2014
- Genre: Indie pop, psychedelic pop
- Length: 37:08
- Label: Joyful Noise Recordings
- Producer: Kaoru Ishibashi

Kishi Bashi chronology
151a (2012)	Lighght (2014)	String Quartet Live! (2015)

Professional ratings
Aggregate scores
Source	Rating
Metacritic	(71/100)
Review scores
Source	Rating
Allmusic	4/5 stars
The Line of Best Fit	9/10 stars
Consequence of Sound	3/5 stars
Syffal	9/10 stars

Lighght is the second studio album by indie pop artist Kishi Bashi. It was released on May 13, 2014. It was produced by Kishi Bashi and recorded in multiple locations, including Home Studios in Athens, Georgia and Clay Garden Studios in Norfolk, Virginia.

== Music ==
Kishi Bashi's sophomore album builds upon the musical ideas he introduced in his first studio album, 151a. A classical violin virtuoso-turned-songwriter, Kaoru Ishibashi continues to use the violin as his main instrument and source of inspiration. In Lighght, he plays with the conventions of both classical music and pop music by layering, distorting, and looping violin sounds in experimental ways. He also utilizes synthetic keyboards and different kinds of percussion to add dimension behind his characteristic singing voice, which Kristofer Lenz describes as "clear, high, and beautiful." Each song is distinctive and complex, ranging from the upbeat, dance-inspired "Carry on Phenomenon" and "The Ballad of Mr. Steak" to the sweet and simple love song "Q&A" and the seven-minute psychedelic, atmospheric conclusion "In Fantasia".

== Critical reception ==
Upon its 2014 release, the album generated favorable reviews from most critics. It received a critic score of 71 on Metacritic, indicating "generally favorable reviews". On popular music review website The Line of Best Fit, reviewer Danny Wadeson wrote of the album, "Put bluntly, every song herein are overbrimming with frenzied brilliance," and concluded by stating that Kishi Bashi has "produced his finest work to date." Other reviewers had less favorable opinions. Kristopher Lenz of music blog Consequence of Sound thought the album missed the mark, expressing that there is "simply too much questionable fluff surrounding the good ideas." Despite disagreements, reviewers seem to agree that Kishi Bashi's sophomore effort has been successful in defining his signature sound.

== Track listing ==
All tracks are written by Kishi Bashi.

No.	Title	Length
1.	"Debut – Impromptu"	0:47
2.	"Philosophize In It! Chemicalize With It!"	3:21
3.	"The Ballad of Mr. Steak"	3:19
4.	"Carry on Phenomenon"	4:04
5.	"Bittersweet Genesis for Him AND Her"	3:33
6.	"Impromptu no 1"	0:59
7.	"Q&A"	3:12
8.	"Once Upon a Lucid Dream (in Afrikaans)"	4:06
9.	"Hahaha, Pt. 1"	2:42
10.	"Hahaha, Pt. 2"	4:01
11.	"In Fantasia"	7:09

=== Japanese bonus tracks ===
No.	Title	Length
12.	"I'll Grow a Garden"	3:23
13.	"I'll See You There"	3:52
14.	"Song For the Sold"	3:00

== Personnel ==
- Kishi Bashi – vocals, strings

Additional performers

- Kevin Barnes – bass on "Hahaha Pt. 2", additional vocals "In Afrikaans"
- Yoed Nir – cello on "Philosophize!", "In Afrikaans", "Q&A", "In Fantasia"
- Amos Housworth, cello on "Philosophize!" and "Bittersweet Genesis"
- Keiko Ishibashi – vocals on "Q&A" and "Impromptu no 1”
- Daniel Brunner and Mike Savino – vocals on "Carry On Phenomenon"
- Zac Colwell – Juno 60 on "Hahaha Pt. 2” and "In Afrikaans"
- Davey Pierce – miniMoog midi-fying on "In Afrikaans"
- Clayton Rychlik – drums on "Carry On Phenomenon", "Philosophize!", "Mr.Steak", "In Afrikaans", "Hahaha Pt. 2”
- Phillip Mayer – additional drums on "Philosophize!".

== Charts ==
=== Charts ===
Chart	Peak position
US Billboard 200	53
US Top Rock Albums (Billboard)	13
US Top Alternative Albums (Billboard)	14
US Vinyl Albums (Billboard)	5

=== Songs ===
Year	Chart	Song	Position
2014	Japan Hot 100	"The Ballad of Mr. Steak"	12
