= Walberg and Auge Drum Company =

American drum hardware manufacturer

Walberg and Auge is a United States drum kit and hardware manufacturer established in 1903 in Worcester, Massachusetts, by Barney Walberg. Walberg and Auge is considered by some to be, "the biggest unknown name in the history of twentieth-century American percussion." The brand is credited with several innovations in musical instruments and associated hardware including the development of the modern hi-hat stand and shell-mounted tom-tom holder. The magazine Modern Drummer detailed the origin story of the modern hi-hat configuration: "After months of experimenting, Walberg's company extended the inner rod and outer tube of his low hat stand to about waist high so he could play the cymbals with his hand as well as his feet." The pivotal innovation was sold by every major drum company under the rubric "Perfection Hats."

Major drum companies that sold Walberg and Auge hardware included Ludwig, Slingerland, Rogers, Gretsch, Leedy, Camco, and Kent.

== History ==
Established in 1903, Walberg and Auge started as a drum manufacturing company and a musical instrument repair shop in Worcester, Massachusetts. Originally named Taylor & Auge, Bernard Eric "Barney" Walberg bought a half-interest in the company which until then was a sole proprietorship of A.L. Auge. After Walberg joined Auge on Oct. 3, 1903, they began the manufacture of drums and other musical instruments.

The firm eventually started innovating, designing, and manufacturing drum hardware for W&A drum sets and other drum companies such as Gretsch, Ludwig, Rogers, Slingerland, Leedy, Camco, and Kent.

In 1920, 'The Music Trade Review' blamed Bernard Walberg for his inventions used in the 'Advent of Jazz'. At the time, Mr. Walberg's inventions included the first cow bell holder for the trap kit, first traps table, first CarryAll bass drum, first folding bass drum pedal and many other musical creations necessary for playing the new radical music of jazz.

Shortly after this accusation, Walberg and Auge invented and manufactured the first hi-hat stand (based from the low boy/sock cymbal stand W&A was already making), first triangle holder, first cymbal stand with rubber feet, first tom mount, first drummer's throne, first clamping basket snare stand (Buck Rogers snare stand), first telescopic wire brushes and much more.

Walberg & Auge Drums

W&A also made high quality 'Perfection' snare drums and drum sets, mostly using shells supplied by Gretsch and Keller with a variety of Gretsch, Rogers, Ludwig hoops and lugs they received from hardware trades and barters.

Brand Reboot

In 2014, Walberg and Auge was reestablished as a not-for-profit public-benefit corporation for historical and educational purposes. A website and Facebook page have been launched in addition to the compiling of a comprehensive history of Walberg and Auge which will be available as a book.
