= Dopamine (Børns album) =

- Standard edition cover. The deluxe edition features the same image in grayscale.

Studio album by Børns
- Released: October 16, 2015
- Recorded: 2013–15
- Studio: Studio America (Los Angeles); Panoramic (West Marin); Rodeo (Santa Monica)
- Genre: Indie pop; alternative rock; synth-pop; psychedelic pop
- Length: 40:25
- Label: Geffen; Interscope
- Producer: Tommy English; John Hill; Jack Kennedy Herkel

Børns chronology
Candy (2014)	Dopamine (2015)	Blue Madonna (2018)

Singles from Dopamine
- 1. "10,000 Emerald Pools" Released: October 7, 2014; 2. "Electric Love" Released: May 6, 2015; 3. "The Emotion" Released: August 19, 2015; 4. "Fool" Released: September 17, 2015; 5. "American Money" Released: September 14, 2016

Dopamine is the debut studio album by American singer-songwriter Børns, released on October 16, 2015 by Interscope Records.

== Background ==
On August 19, 2015, Børns announced the album on Zane Lowe's Beats 1 Radio show. He also released the first official single from the album titled "The Emotion". He confirmed in an interview with Spin in July that he was once again working with producer Tommy English (who produced the Candy EP). Spin also confirmed that "he's taking his melodies seriously though, calling on heavyweight producers like Emile Haynie and Jeff Bhasker for help".

He has stated during production he and English used "a lot of swoopy Beach Boys-esque harmonies" and that "Some of the songs were influenced by some old '60s and '70s Playboys, because those are the best ones in my opinion". He later claimed he wouldn't mask how he really felt stating "It's hard to fake that, - When you listen to music, you can tell if it's a real love song or not. I’m hoping that honesty will translate." A theme in the album is the feelings associated with love.

The lead single from the album is a track entitled "The Emotion" which the singer posted on his Vevo and was later released on iTunes and Apple Music. The album is preceded by his late-2014 debut EP Candy, which included the songs "Electric Love", "10,000 Emerald Pools" and "Past Lives".

At South by Southwest 2015, Børns played a set for Spotify at the Spotify House. He played "American Money" alongside two unreleased songs, "Broke" (originally titled "So I Broke") and "Let You Down".

A Target edition of the album has also been released, containing two additional tracks, called "Rolling in the Roses" and "A Song for the Stoned Girl in My Bed."

== Critical reception ==
Professional ratings
Review scores
Source	Rating
ABC News	(positive)
AllMusic	4/5 stars
Alternative Addiction	4/5 stars
Glide Magazine	7/10 stars
Renowned for Sound	4.5/5 stars
The Guardian	3/5 stars
The Michigan Daily	A
The Paper	4/5 stars
The Stylegazer	5/5 stars

Dopamine's release was met with positive reviews from music critics. Neil Yeung from AllMusic gave the album 4 out of 5 stars, stating that everything on the album is coated thick with honey, and praised the album production. In a positive review, Tina Roumeliotis from The Daily Listening named the musician "the male Zella Day", and concluded that "Dopamine is definitely an album worth picking up this fall". Connor Smith from The Paper also gave the album a rating of 4 out of 5 stars and said that "Børns is drastically better than Lana Del Rey". On Album of the Year, the album holds a critic score of 70 out of 100, based on 4 reviews, and a user score of 77, based on 124 ratings.

== Track listing ==
Dopamine – Standard edition
No.	Title	Writer(s)	Producer(s)	Length
1.	"10,000 Emerald Pools"	Garrett Borns; Jack Kennedy Herkel	Herkel	2:55
2.	"Dug My Heart"	Borns; Tommy English; Josh Moran	English	3:10
3.	"Electric Love"	Borns; English; Nicholas Long; Josh Moran	English	3:38
4.	"American Money"	Borns; English; Irena Lysiuk; Genevieve Bufalino; Aimee Cavanagh	English	4:21
5.	"The Emotion"	Borns; English	English	3:45
6.	"Holy Ghost"	Borns; English; Long	English	4:17
7.	"Past Lives"	Borns; English	English	4:34
8.	"Clouds"	Borns	English	3:10
9.	"Dopamine"	Borns; John Hill; Titanic Sinclair; English; Phredley Brown	English; Hill	3:44
10.	"Overnight Sensation"	Borns; English; Sinclair	English	3:18
11.	"Fool"	Borns; English; Ammar Malik	English	3:38
Total length:				40:25

Target Edition bonus tracks
No.	Title	Writer(s)	Length
12.	"Rolling in the Roses"	Borns	3:46
13.	"A Song for the Stoned Girl in My Bed"	Borns	2:13
Total length:			45:84

== Charts ==
Chart performance for Dopamine
Chart (2015)	Peak position
Canadian Albums Chart	56
US Billboard 200	24
US Billboard Alternative Albums	2
US Billboard Top Rock Albums	2

== Personnel ==
- Børns – vocals, art direction, design
- Chris Gehringer – mastering
- Ted Jensen – mastering
- Will Quinnell – mastering
- Manny Marroquin – mixing
- Chris Galland – mixing assistance
- Ike Schultz – mixing assistance
- Lauren Dukoff – photography
- Gwendolyn Schwartzkopf – art direction, design

== Certifications ==
Certifications for Dopamine
Region	Certification	Certified units/sales
Brazil (Pro-Música Brasil)	Gold	20,000^{‡}
New Zealand (RMNZ)	Gold	7,500^{‡}
United States (RIAA)	Gold	500,000^{‡}
^{‡} Sales+streaming figures based on certification alone.
