= H.U.M.A.N.W.I.N.E. =

American band (founded 2002)

H.U.M.A.N.W.I.N.E
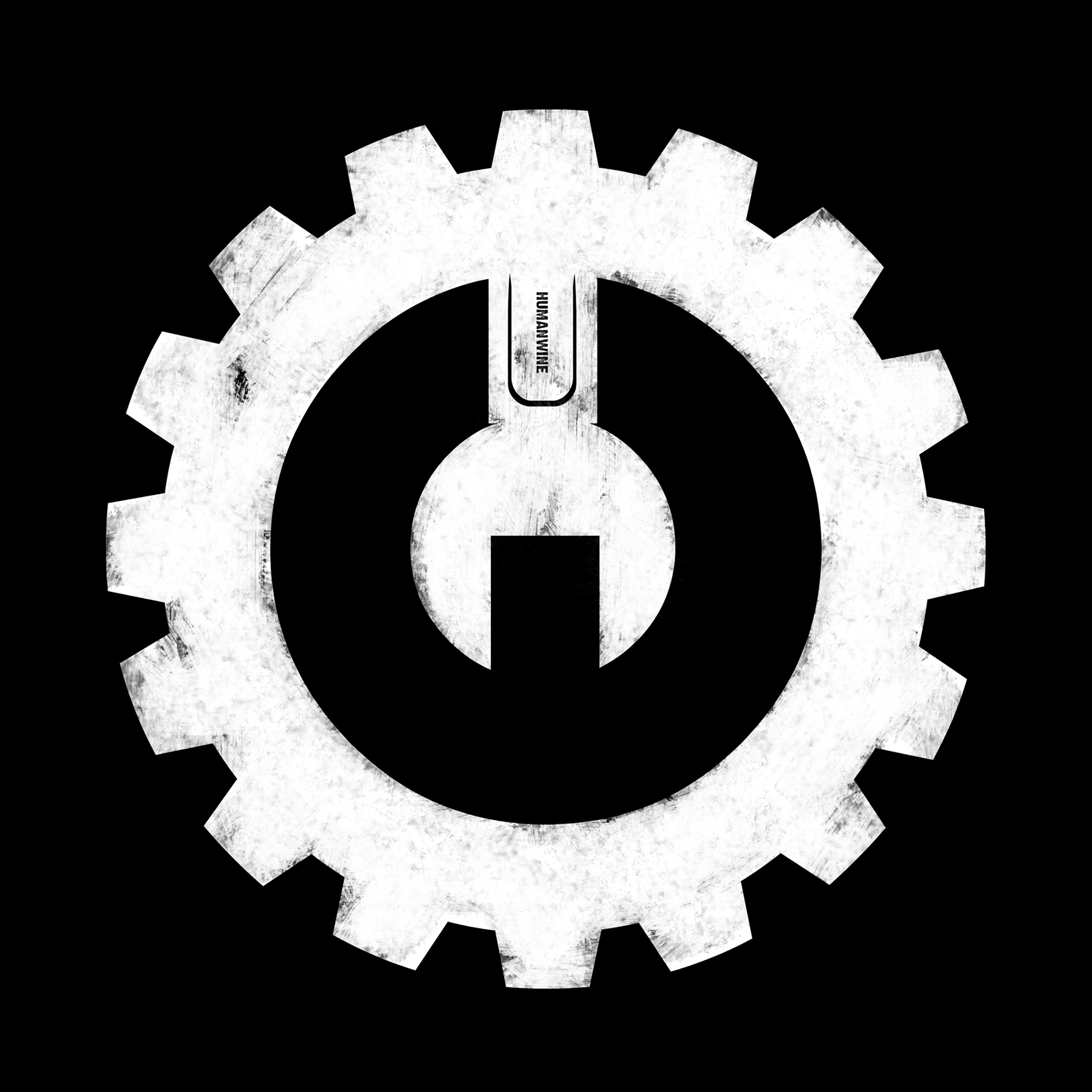
- "Wrench in the Works", HUMANWINE's logo

Background information
- Origin: Vermont, United States
- Genres: Dark cabaret
- Years active: 2002–present
- Labels: Nervous Relatives, Cordless Recordings
- Members: Holly Brewer
- Past members: Matthew McNiss; Paul Dilley; Nate Greenslit; Tony Metsiou; Jeremy John Pilny; Annie Dole; Patrick Dole
- Website: humanwine.bandcamp.com

H.U.M.A.N.W.I.N.E. (often stylized HUMANWINE) is an American Vermont-based band with early roots in Boston, Massachusetts, United States. Founded in 2002 by Holly Brewer, HUMANWINE has had a long history of rotating lineups of supporting musicians. In 2016 they recorded a four-volume release "aether".

HUMANWINE has received various nominations and awards. The band has been featured in articles in many sources including the Boston Phoenix, the Boston Herald, The Pitch, The Dallas Morning News, and the Worcester Telegram & Gazette, as well as being featured on the cover of Northeast Performer Magazine.

HUMANWINE has opened for acts at both the Orpheum Theatre in Boston and Webster Hall in New York. They have also opened for the Squirrel Nut Zippers at the Paradise Rock Club in Boston as well as headlining their own show at the venue.

Their name is said, with tongue in cheek, to be an acronym of the phrase, "Humans Underground Making Anagrams Nightly While Imperialistic Not-Mes Enslave", a reference to the subtly-coded lyrics that comprise most of their songs.

== Awards and nominations ==
- Best Local Female Vocalist in the 2008 FNX/Boston Phoenix Best Music Poll
- Nominated for Best Local Female Vocalist in the 20th Annual Boston Music Awards 2007
- HUMANWINE's first release through Nervous Relatives Records, Fighting Naked was named Best Album of 2007 by WBZ-TV
- Best New Act in the FNX/Boston Phoenix Best Music Poll 2006
- Best New Act in the 19th Annual Boston Music Awards 2006

== Touring ==
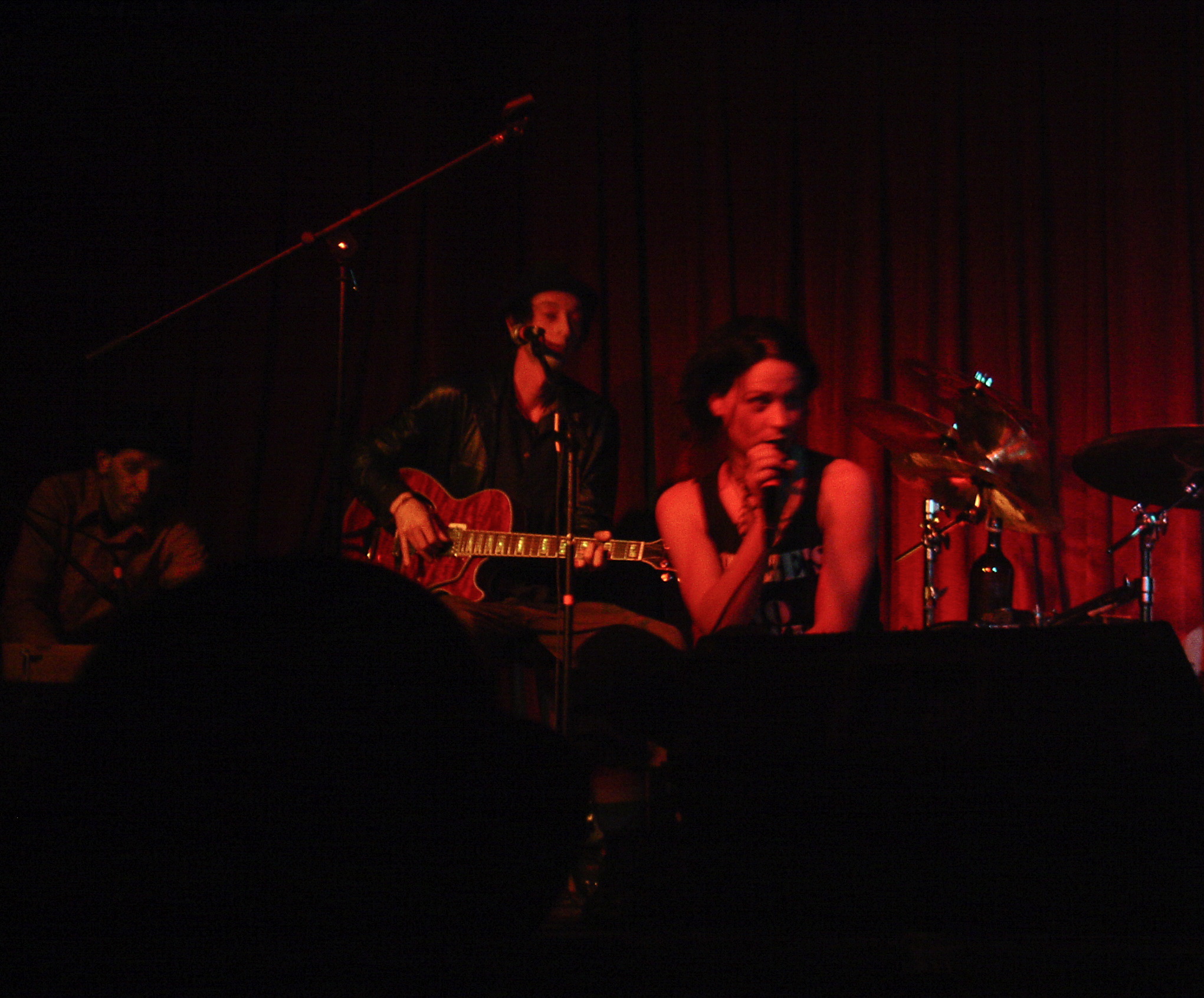
HUMANWINE performing at AS220 in 2006

HUMANWINE has made two national tours as well as making a West Coast tour.

Their first U.S. national tour was billed as the "Double Dipping Tour" and took place in November 2006. They traveled with Reverend Glasseye and shared members between the two bands, hence the tour title. After this tour, Paul Dilley of Reverend Glasseye became a staple of HUMANWINE.

Their second national tour came after they were signed to Cordless Recordings. While Cordless Recordings handled the digital distribution, Nervous Relatives Records handled the physical distribution. This tour was used as promotion for their new album, Fighting Naked, and took place from March through April 2007. For this album and tour, rather than using their primary drummer of Nate Greenslit (who went on a personal hiatus), they recruited Brian Viglione, Holly Brewer's childhood next-door neighbor from Greenville, New Hampshire.

For their West Coast tour they took a different approach for their lineup. Holly Brewer and Mat McNiss left the rest of the band behind and trained local musicians that they knew on a show-by-show basis, resulting in a different lineup and feel for each performance. This tour began in December 2008 and lasted through May 2009.

== Vinlandia ==
On July 30, 2011, HUMANWINE hosted a small music festival called "Vinlandia" in West Chesterfield, New Hampshire. The festival featured several acts, an open mic, and overnight camping. It is yet to be determined if Vinlandia will be an annual event.

== Members ==
Core members:

- Holly Brewer
- Matthew McNiss

Select musicians of the rotating lineup:

- A Far Cry
- Adam Glasseye Beckley
- Brian Carpenter
- Nathan Cohen
- Paul Dilley
- Esther "E-Star"
- Nate Greenslit
- Jeremy Harman
- Kaethe Hostetter
- Brian King
- Tim Maher
- Ashley Vandiver
- Courtenay Vandiver
- Brian Viglione
- Jen "Mary" Widow

== Discography ==
=== Albums ===
- Xe. (as Veil) [2002]
- For Burning Cities Present [2004]
- Fighting Naked [2007]
- Mass Exodus (Full Length) [2009]
- aether [2016]

=== Extended plays ===
- Kalifornia [2003]
- Rivolta Silenziosa [2007]
- Mass Exodus [2009]

=== Miscellaneous releases ===
- The Sepiachord Companion [2009] - includes the track Rivolta Silenziosa
- Humanwine/Absinthe Rose Split Vinyl Bronze 12" Record (Limited Edition) [2010]

=== Publications ===
- Codex [2016]

== See also ==
- Steampunk musicians
- Women in punk rock
