= The Dead Betties =

The Dead Betties is an American, Brooklyn, New York-based rock band composed of lead singer–bassist Joshua Ackley, drummer Derek Pippin, and guitarist Eric Shepherd. With albums on Warner Music, Chainsaw Records, Cordless, Heartcore Records, Rotten Princess, and video rotation on MTV and VH1, the band is best known for their intense songwriting, melodic impact and explosive performances. Through appearances at CBGB, Cake Shop, Bowery Ballroom, North 6, Knitting Factory and headlining slots on nationwide and international tours and festivals between 2004 and 2008—Homo-a-Gogo (Olympia, Washington), SXSW (Austin, Texas), CMJ (New York City), and NXNE (Toronto, Canada)—The Dead Betties reached a broader audience.

In 2014, while the band was putting the finishing touches on its forthcoming covers album, lead single "The Way We Live Now" received 5 out of 5 stars from About Punk's Ryan Cooper. "The Way We Live Now" shares its name with the Susan Sontag short story and is an ode to civil rights pioneers from the 1980s. "The Way We Live Now" also received praise from The Deli, while the video for "Lucky" was written up in Huffington Post and the video for "Angel" was premiered by Huffington Post and shared by Out Magazine. In 2020, Brooklyn Vegan reported that The Dead Betties would be releasing a compilation album, "Killer Hits No Filler". The album was released on October 16, 2020. Following "Killer Hits No Filler", the band returned to the studio to work on a project that has never been released. In September 2024, Rolling Stone premiered the band's new single, "Impossible Future", and announced that the band had finished a new album, "Impossible Future", set to be released by Rotten Princess records on October 18, 2024. The video for the second single, "Blood (a Babes In Toyland cover)" was premiered by PunkNews.org on October 1, 2024. Following "Impossible Future", the band released three standalone singles in the first half of 2025; Evolution Blues, Coffins, and Hot Body Contest.

On October 10, 2025, The Dead Betties announced the upcoming release of a new EP "Whitey", and premiered a video of the lead single, "Whatever Anyway" in Punknews.org. November 2025 saw the second single, "What's A Good Victim Supposed to Say?", released with accompanying interviews in Retrofuturista and NPR. On November 19, the title track "Whitey" was released as the third single, followed by a video premiere in New Noise Magazine. The "Whitey" EP was released on November 21, 2025. The EP received significant praise for the band.

== Recordings ==
- Sleeper (EP, 2002, Thorobred Records)
- Relic (EP, 2003, Thorobred Records)
- The Dead Betties (EP, 2004, Heartcore)
- Summer of '93 (Full-length, 2006, Heartcore/Chainsaw Records)
- Nightmare Sequence (Full-length, 2007, Cordless Records/WMG)
- "Destination I Do" / "Malls of the Midwest" (7" vinyl single, 2007, WMG)
- F U A, You're In The Army Now (Full-length, 2007, WMG)
- This is My Brain on Drugs (Full-length, 2008, WMG)
- Covers (EP, 2014, Disc Drive)
- Killer Hits No Filler (Compilation, 2020, WMG, Cordless, Chainsaw Records)
- Sweetheart (unreleased, 2022)
- Impossible Future (Full-length, October 2024, Rotten Princess)
- Evolution Blues (Single, January 2025, Rotten Princess)
- Coffins (Single, February 2025, Rotten Princess)
- Hot Body Contest (Single, April 2025 Rotten Princess)
- Whitey (EP, November 2025, Rotten Princess)
