= Electric Love (song) =

Single by Børns

from the album Dopamine
- Released: November 10, 2014
- Genre: Glam rock; dream pop
- Length: 3:38
- Label: Geffen; Interscope
- Songwriters: Garrett Borns; Tommy English; Nick Long; Josh Moran
- Producer: Tommy English

Børns singles chronology
"Electric Love" (2014)	"10,000 Emerald Pools" (2015)

Music video
- "Electric Love" on YouTube

Audio sample
- "Electric Love": file; help

"Electric Love" is the debut single by American singer and songwriter Børns. The song was originally recorded by Børns for his second extended play, Candy, where it appears as the first track, and later appeared as the third track on his debut studio album, Dopamine. On February 26, 2017, the song was certified Platinum by the Recording Industry Association of America.

== Release ==
"Electric Love" was originally released on November 10, 2014, on Børns' second EP, Candy. The song was re-released as the third track of Børns' debut album, Dopamine.

On May 6, 2015, a music video for "Electric Love" was uploaded on Børns' Vevo channel on YouTube. The video features Børns singing the song and playing the guitar, as well as numerous female dancers and ecstatic colorful animations.

== Reception ==
"Electric Love" has been well received by both critics and audiences. NPR referred to the song as viral. The Guardian's Kate Hutchinson praised the track's blend of glam rock and "high-intensity sound." Neil Z. Yeung of AllMusic dubbed the song a "Gary Glitter stomper" and the "alt-radio hit of summer 2015." Spin's Brennan Carley described the song as a "crisp, beachside pop anthem."

== Charts ==
=== Weekly charts ===
Chart (2015–2016)	Peak position
US Bubbling Under Hot 100 (Billboard)	13
US Hot Rock & Alternative Songs (Billboard)	13
US Adult Pop Airplay (Billboard)	20
US Pop Airplay (Billboard)	31
US Rock & Alternative Airplay (Billboard)	22

Chart (2020)	Peak position
Australia (ARIA)	52
Belgium (Ultratip Bubbling Under Flanders)	15
Global 200 (Billboard)	97
Hungary (Single Top 40)	34
Ireland (IRMA)	94
Lithuania (AGATA)	68
Netherlands Single Tip (MegaCharts)	1
Scottish Singles Sales (Official Charts)	72
Sweden Heatseeker (Sverigetopplistan)	4
UK Singles Downloads (Official Charts)	81

=== Year-end charts ===
Chart (2015)	Position
US Alternative Songs (Billboard)	49
US Hot Rock Songs (Billboard)	47

Chart (2016)	Position
US Hot Rock Songs (Billboard)	49

== Certifications ==
Region	Certification	Certified units/sales
Australia (ARIA)	2× Platinum	140,000^{‡}
Brazil (Pro-Música Brasil)	2× Platinum	120,000^{‡}
Canada (Music Canada)	Platinum	80,000^{‡}
Denmark (IFPI Danmark)	Gold	45,000^{‡}
Italy (FIMI)	Gold	50,000^{‡}
New Zealand (RMNZ)	2× Platinum	60,000^{‡}
Poland (ZPAV)	Gold	10,000^{‡}
Portugal (AFP)	Gold	10,000^{‡}
Spain (Promusicae)	Gold	30,000^{‡}
United Kingdom (BPI)	Platinum	600,000^{‡}
United States (RIAA)	Platinum	1,000,000^{‡}
^{‡} Sales+streaming figures based on certification alone.
