= Blue Madonna =

Studio album by Børns
- Released: January 12, 2018
- Recorded: 2016–17
- Length: 41:40
- Label: Interscope
- Producer: Thomas Schleiter

Børns chronology
Dopamine (2015)	Blue Madonna (2018)	Suddenly (2023)

Singles from Blue Madonna
- 1. "Faded Heart" Released: July 28, 2017; 2. "Sweet Dreams" Released: September 29, 2017; 3. "I Don't Want U Back" Released: December 15, 2017; 4. "God Save Our Young Blood" Released: January 2, 2018

Professional ratings
Aggregate scores
Source	Rating
Metacritic	67/100
Review scores
Source	Rating
AllMusic	3.5/5 stars

Blue Madonna is the second studio album by American musician Børns. It was released on January 12, 2018 through Interscope Records (and his final with the label).

== Background ==
On July 28, 2017, Børns released the single "Faded Heart" on Interscope Records. On September 29, 2017, he released his next single, "Sweet Dreams". Two promotional videos, "The Search for the Lost Sounds" and "The Faded Heart Sessions", were released on his YouTube channel along with the singles.

The album was announced via Instagram on December 4, 2017. A pre-order on blue vinyl (1,500 copies) was available on the Urban Outfitters website in December 2017, but the limited-edition sale was removed before its official release on January 12, 2018.

"Faded Heart", "Sweet Dreams", I Don't Want U Back", and "God Save Our Young Blood" featuring Lana Del Rey were released as singles prior to the official album release.

The official lyrics to "Supernatural" released the day prior as bonus material for Spotify users who pre-saved the album. Additionally, Børns, using an account on Genius.com, has taken to leaving personal commentaries regarding written lyrics on certain songs appearing on the album. For example, Børns says, "I pictured Lou Reed when I wrote this singing about being a glowing star with a fragile heart," about his song "Faded Heart".

Blue Madonna was officially released on January 12, 2018.

== Track listing ==
Note: All tracks produced by Thomas Schleiter, who also goes by the name "Tommy English".

No.	Title	Writer(s)	Length
1.	"God Save Our Young Blood" (with Lana Del Rey)	Garrett Borns; Thomas Schleiter	3:53
2.	"Faded Heart"	Borns; Schleiter	3:34
3.	"Sweet Dreams"	Borns; Schleiter	3:20
4.	"We Don't Care"	Borns; Schleiter; Angelo Petraglia; Barry Dean	3:33
5.	"Man"	Borns; Schleiter	3:57
6.	"Iceberg"	Borns; Schleiter	3:30
7.	"Second Night of Summer"	Borns; Schleiter; Jakob Bjorn-Hansen	3:24
8.	"I Don't Want U Back"	Borns; Schleiter	3:51
9.	"Tension" (interlude)	Borns; Schleiter	1:34
10.	"Supernatural"	Borns; Schleiter	3:45
11.	"Blue Madonna"	Borns; Schleiter	2:20
12.	"Bye-bye Darling"	Borns; Schleiter	4:59
Total length:			41:33

Notes

- "Supernatural" features theremin-playing by Armen Ra
- "Blue Madonna" features background vocals by Lana Del Rey.

== Personnel ==
- Børns – performance
- Tommy English – production
- Chris Gehringer – mastering
- Tony Maserati – mixing
- Brian Roettinger – art direction
- Chuck Grant – photography
- Armen Ra – theremin (track 10)

== Charts ==
Chart (2018)	Peak position
Canadian Albums (Billboard)	80
New Zealand Heatseeker Albums (RMNZ)	8
US Billboard 200	49
US Top Alternative Albums (Billboard)	3
US Top Rock Albums (Billboard)	6

== Appearances in other media ==
- "Faded Heart" is featured in the EA Sports video game FIFA 18
- "Sweet Dreams" is featured in the Sony Pictures film Flatliners
