= Kennedy (musician) =

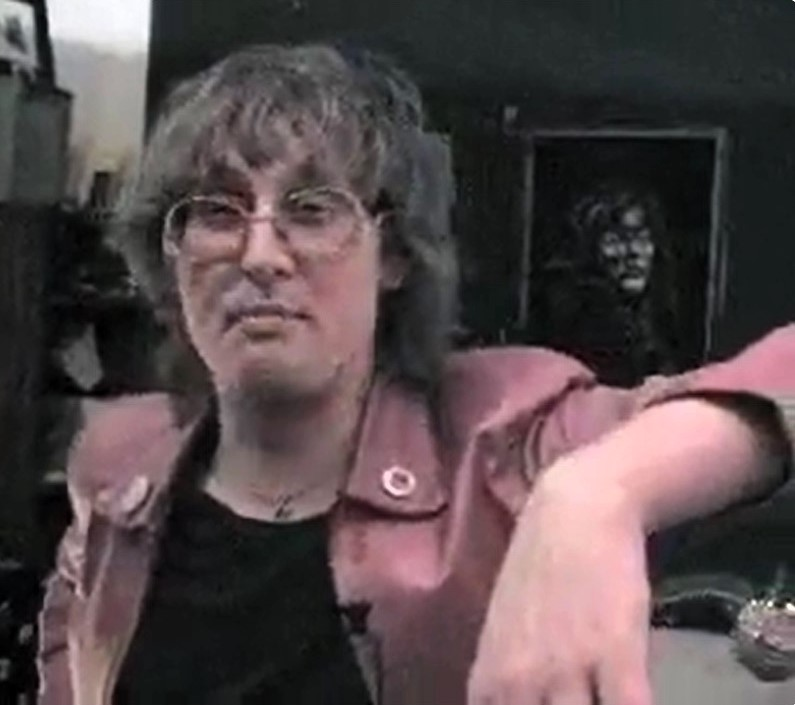
- Kennedy interviewed in 2006

Background information
- Born: Jack Kennedy
- Origin: Los Angeles, California, U.S.
- Genres: Disco; nu-disco; EDM; alternative rock
- Years active: 2000-present
- Labels: Barsuk, Magic Bullet Media, Sea Level Records, Warner Bros., Cordless Recordings
- Website: www.kennedykarate.com

Jack Kennedy, better known as simply Kennedy, is a musician from Thousand Oaks, California. His signature music style fuses disco and modern day electronic dance music. Kennedy is best known for co-writing and producing the song "10,000 Emerald Pools" with Børns, a single that received an RIAA Gold certification. He gained a cult following for his song "Karate" which has appeared in several commercials, movies and television shows. Kennedy is also a former member of Silversun Pickups, an American alternative rock band from Los Angeles that was formed in 2000.

== Career ==
Kennedy produced the song "10,000 Emerald Pools" by BØRNS. The song's title is named after the street in Las Vegas where Kennedy's mother lives.

Kennedy has also worked with Gregg Alexander from New Radicals.

== Songs in popular culture ==
Kennedy's song "Karate" was featured in the viral Dollar Shave Club commercial in the dance sequence at the commercial's end where the owner and founder, Mike, dances with Alejandra, his key employee. Kennedy's music has been featured in a number of films. His song "Mama Made Me A Pimp" was featured in the Jonah Hill / Russell Brand film Get Him to the Greek. Several songs ("White Chocolate", "I Love Me", "Wake Up", and "Turkey Pot Pie") appeared in the 2005 film National Lampoon's Adam & Eve. "Let's Get Def" was featured in the 2006 comedy film American Pie Presents: The Naked Mile. The song "Karate" appeared in the 2006 film The Namesake, as well as the 2008 film Nick and Norah's Infinite Playlist.
