= New Potato Caboose =

American rock band

- Origin: Washington, DC
- Genres: Rock; Americana; Jam band
- Years active: 1983–present
- Label: Rykodisc
- Members: Doug Pritchett; Don Laux; John "Red" Redling; John Trupp; John McConnell; Tim Pruitt; Michael Mahoney; Steve Leroy
- Website: Official band website

New Potato Caboose (abbreviated NPC) is an American rock band formed in the Washington, D.C. area in 1983. Associated with the jam band genre, the group is known for using two drummers and blending elements of roots rock and Americana.

== History ==
=== Origins (1983–1986) ===
The band formed in 1983 at the Catholic University of America in Washington, D.C.. Students Doug Pritchett (acoustic guitar/vocals), Don Laux (guitar/vocals), and John "Red" Redling (keyboards/vocals) began playing together as an acoustic trio named "Wood 'n' Steel". Their early sets consisted of covers by artists such as Crosby, Stills & Nash, Bob Dylan, and The Beatles.

By 1986, the band changed its name to New Potato Caboose and expanded its lineup. Redling moved to keyboards, Laux played electric guitar, and they added drummer Chris Arminio, guitarist Rich Della Fera, and bassist Dana Smith.

=== Touring and recording (1987–1996) ===
In the late 1980s and early 1990s, New Potato Caboose played approximately 200 shows per year. They frequently performed at The Bayou in Georgetown. During this period, the lineup shifted to include dual drummers John Trupp and John McConnell, along with bassist Mike Mahoney.

The band released their debut album, Promising Traveler, on Rykodisc in 1989. Produced by Elliot Mazer, the album won the Washington Area Music Association awards for Best Debut Recording and Best Rock/Pop Recording.

New Potato Caboose was the first band to perform at the Wetlands Preserve in New York City. Throughout the 1990s, they shared bills with acts such as Blues Traveler, Widespread Panic, Dave Matthews Band, The Band, and The Neville Brothers. Around 1996, the band scaled back their touring schedule.

=== Later years (1996–present) ===
Following their active touring years, the band continued to perform at reunion shows and short tours.

In 2022, the group released It Ain't a Thing, a studio album featuring original songs and previously unreleased material. It was produced by John Alagía at Haunted Hollow studio in Charlottesville, Virginia. The album reached #5 on the Jambands radio chart in August 2022 and #18 on the Roots Music Report in October 2022.

== Members ==
Current lineup

- Doug Pritchett – acoustic guitar, lead vocals
- Don Laux – rhythm guitar, vocals
- John "Red" Redling – keyboards, vocals
- Tim Pruitt – lead guitar, vocals
- Mike Mahoney – bass guitar
- Steve Leroy – bass guitar
- John Trupp – drums
- John McConnell – drums

== Discography ==
- Promising Traveler (1989)
- It Ain't a Thing (2022)
