= Yojijukugo =

Japanese lexeme consisting of four kanji

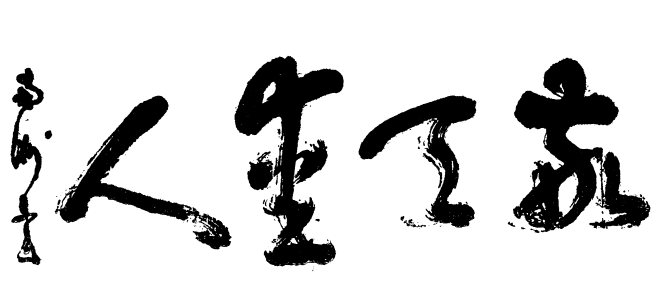
Keiten-aijin (敬天愛人), meaning "revere heaven, love people". Calligraphy by Saigō Takamori.

A yojijukugo (Japanese: 四字熟語; pronounced [jo̞ʑiʑɨꜜkɯ̟ɡo̞]) is a Japanese lexeme consisting of four kanji (Chinese characters). English translations of yojijukugo include "four-character compound", "four-character idiom", "four-character idiomatic phrase", and "four-character idiomatic compound". It is equivalent to the Chinese chengyu, from which it is derived.

== Definition and classification ==
Yojijukugo in the broad sense refers to Japanese compound words consisting of four kanji characters, which may contain an idiomatic meaning or simply be a compound noun. However, in the narrow or strict sense, the term refers only to four-kanji compounds that have a particular (idiomatic) meaning, which cannot be inferred from the meanings of the components that make them up.

=== Non-idiomatic yojijukugo ===
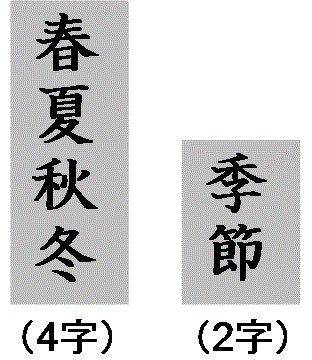
"Spring, summer, autumn and winter" (Shunkashūtō) and "season" are almost synonymous words, but the former, which consists of four kanji characters, gives a stronger impression.

There are a very large number—perhaps tens of thousands—of four-character compounds. A great majority of them are those whose meanings can be easily deduced from the literal definitions of their parts. These compounds may be called non-idiomatic yojijukugo.

For example, the compound word okunaikin'en (屋内禁煙, "no smoking indoors") is a non-idiomatic yojijukugo. It is made up of four characters: oku (屋, building), nai (内, inside), kin (禁, prohibited), and en (煙, smoking). Alternatively, it can be regarded as consisting of two common two-character compounds: okunai (屋内, indoors), and kin'en (禁煙, prohibition of smoking). Either way, the meaning of the compound is clear; there are no idiomatic meanings beyond the literal meanings of its components. Below are a few more examples of non-idiomatic yojijukugo:

- 大学教育, daigakukyōiku (daigaku, university + kyōiku, education)
- 環境悪化, kankyōakka (kankyō, environment + akka, deterioration)
- 日米関係, nichibeikankei (nichi, Japan + bei, U.S. + kankei, relations)
- 歴史小説, rekishishōsetsu (rekishi, history + shōsetsu, novel)
- 宣伝効果, sendenkōka (senden, advertisement + kōka, effect).

Yojijukugo 四字熟語 is itself a non-idiomatic four-character phrase.

=== Idiomatic yojijukugo ===
By contrast, several thousands of these four-character compounds are true idioms in the sense that they have a particular meaning that may not be deduced from the literal meanings of the component words. An example of the highly idiomatic compound is:

- 海千山千, umisenyamasen (umi, ocean + sen, thousand + yama, mountain + sen, thousand)

"Ocean-thousand, mountain-thousand" means "a sly old fox" or someone who has had all sorts of experience in life so that they can handle, or wiggle out of, any difficult situations through cunning alone. This meaning derives from an old saying that a snake lives in the ocean for a thousand years and in the mountains for another thousand years before it turns into a dragon. Hence a sly, worldly-wise person is referred to as one who has spent "a thousand years in the ocean and another thousand in the mountains".

Many idiomatic yojijukugo were adopted from classical Chinese literature. Other four-character idioms are derived from Buddhist literature and scriptures, old Japanese customs and proverbs, and historical and contemporary Japanese life and social experience. The entries in the published dictionaries of yojijukugo are typically limited to these idiomatic compounds of various origins.

=== Chinese and Japanese origins of idiomatic yojijukugo ===
The Japanese yojijukugo are closely related to the Chinese chengyu, in that a great many of the former are adopted from the latter and have the same or similar meaning as in Chinese. Many other yojijukugo, however, are Japanese in origin. Some examples of these indigenous Japanese four-character idioms are:

- 合縁奇縁, aienkien (uncanny romantic relationship formed by a quirk of fate)
- 一期一会, ichigoichie (once-in-a-lifetime experience)
- 海千山千, umisenyamasen (sly old dog of much worldly wisdom)
- 色恋沙汰, irokoizata (romantic entanglement; love affair)
- 傍目八目, okamehachimoku (a bystander's vantage point)
- 手前味噌, temaemiso (singing one's own praises; tooting one's own horn)
- 二股膏薬, futamatagōyaku (double-dealer; timeserver)

== Examples of idiomatic yojijukugo ==
一攫千金 ikkakusenkin (ichi one + kaku grasp + sen thousand + kin gold)
making a fortune at a stroke. (Origin: Chinese classics)
美人薄命 bijinhakumei (bi beauty + jin person + haku thin + mei life)
A beautiful woman is destined to die young; Beauty and fortune seldom go together. (Origin: Chinese classics)
酔生夢死 suiseimushi (sui drunken + sei life + mu dreamy + shi death)
idling one's life away; dreaming away one's life accomplishing nothing significant (Origin: Chinese classics)
羊頭狗肉 yōtōkuniku (yō sheep + tō head + ku dog + niku meat)
crying wine and selling vinegar; extravagant advertisement (Origin: Chinese classics)
悪因悪果 akuin'akka (aku bad/evil + in cause + aku bad/evil + ka effect)
An evil cause produces an evil effect; Sow evil and reap evil. (Origin: Buddhist scriptures)
会者定離 eshajōri (e meeting + sha person + jō always + ri be separated)
Every meeting must involve a parting; Those who meet must part. (Origin: Buddhist scriptures)
一期一会 ichigoichie (ichi one + go life + ichi one + e encounter)
(Every encounter is a) once-in-a-lifetime encounter (Origin: Japanese tea ceremony)
一石二鳥 issekinichō (ichi one + seki stone + ni two + chō bird)
killing two birds with one stone (Origin: English proverb)
異体同心 itaidōshin (i different + tai body + dō same + shin mind)
Harmony of mind between two persons; two persons acting in perfect accord.
順風満帆 junpūmanpan (jun gentle/favorable + pū wind + man full + pan sails)
smooth sailing with all sails set; everything going smoothly
十人十色 jūnintoiro (jū ten + nin person + to ten + iro color)
to each their own; So many people, so many minds.
自画自賛 jigajisan (ji own/self + ga painting + ji self/own + san praise/an inscription written on a painting)
a painting with an inscription or poem written by the artist themselves (as a non-idiomatic compound)
singing one's own praises; blowing one's own horn; self-admiration (as an idiomatic compound)
我田引水 gaden'insui (ga own/self + den field + in draw + sui water)
self-seeking; feathering one's own nest
唯我独尊 yuigadokuson (yui only + ga self + doku alone + son respect/honor)
I alone am honored; holier-than-thou; Holy am I alone (Origin: Buddhist scriptures)
電光石火 denkōsekka (den electricity + kō light + seki stone + ka fire)
as fast as lightning
一日一歩 ichinichiippo (ichi one + nichi day + ichi one + po step)
one step each day
弱肉強食 jakunikukyōshoku (jaku weak + niku meat + kyō strong + shoku meal)
law of the jungle; stronger supersede weaker
喜怒哀楽 kidoairaku (ki joy + do anger + ai sorrow + raku pleasure)
basic human emotions
已己巳己 ikomiki (i halt + ko self + mi sixth Earthly Branch + ki self)
all the same

== See also ==
- Japanese proverbs
- Chengyu, the Sinitic equivalent
- Sajaseong-eo
