= Notorious MSG =

American hip hop group

- From left to right: The Hunan Bomb, Hong Kong Fever, Down-Lo Mein

Background information
- Origin: New York, New York, U.S.
- Genres: Comedy rap, pop punk
- Years active: 2002–present
- Label: Cordless Recordings
- Members: Hong Kong Fever; Down-Lo Mein; The Hunan Bomb
- Past members: Funky Buddha; Futomaki
- Website: NotoriousMSG.com

Notorious MSG is a performing trio of Asian American rappers founded in 2002 in Chinatown, Manhattan, New York City. Their songs are parodies of gangster rap mixed with Asian American culture, featuring lyrics about gangster lifestyles and Chinese food and boasting innuendos regarding women. Their group name is a parody of Brooklyn rapper The Notorious B.I.G., with "MSG" referring to monosodium glutamate, a sodium additive commonly used in East Asian cuisines.

== History ==
The group members always appear and perform in character. The fictional backstory says that they all met in the kitchen of the New York Chinatown restaurant in which they worked, but the group members are all Asian-American artists and film-makers. It has been suggested that they met as friends at Cornell University.

== Group members and backstories ==
- Hong Kong Fever: The ringleader; from Kowloon Bay, Hong Kong. Worked as a waiter.
- Down-Lo Mein: (or D-Lo), the "Yellow Gigolo". From Ping-tun, Taiwan. Worked as a cook.
- Futomaki: One of the original members. From Japan, he had to leave the group due to the deportation by the INS in 2003. Worked as a cook.
- Funky Buddha: (September 8, 1973 — October 2, 2005). Real name Benson Lam. Replaced Futomaki; from mainland China. Worked as a dishwasher. According to the group, Funky Buddha was supposedly killed outside of a restaurant in Chinatown in a drive-by shooting.
- The Hunan Bomb: The Killing Machine, Replaced Funky Buddha after his untimely death. From Inchon, South Korea and used to make a living as an underground fighter.

=== Supporting members ===
- Noodles, drummer. From Hiroshima, Japan.
- Billy D. Wang, guitarist. From Hollywood, Florida.
- Mr. Lucky, bass guitarist. Also from Japan.
- Angus Wong.

In 2006, PRI's The World reported that the trio was in negotiations with Comedy Central to develop a series.

Notorious MSG's website had a few singles for download. Their first cut, "Wok the Party", was received with mediocre fanfare. Shortly thereafter, they released three singles (such as Chinatown Hustler) that showed their potential for splicing rhymes to background beats, and garnered much popularity.

== Live performances ==
In 2003 and 2004 Notorious MSG started to give small, organized concerts, generally to a few hundred people at any given time. One of their earliest performances was given at Rutgers University. Their first West Coast performance, given in February 2005, just outside Los Angeles, was part of a night of Asian-themed stand up comedy.

They performed on August 4 and 5 at the Vans Warped Tour 2007 (Nassau Coliseum and Raceway Park, NJ).

In recent years, the Notorious MSG has also performed in various music venues in New York City, such as Bowery Ballroom, CBGB's (just before it closed), Santos Party House and Brooklyn Bowl.

After concerts they stay around to mingle with the audience, sign autographs and have their pictures taken. The members stay in character during and after the event.

== Discography ==
In the Fall of 2004, Notorious MSG released their first album, Die Hungry. It is approximately 35 minutes, with four interludes and eight songs, of which one is a remix.

Track list:

1. Intro
2. Straight out of Canton
3. Heat it Up
4. Hong Kong Heartbreak (Sketch)
5. Dim Sum Girl
6. Chinese Funk
7. Buddha Time (Sketch)
8. Egg Rollin'
9. Last Meal (Sketch)
10. Streets of Chinatown
11. Yello Fever (feat. Whip Montez)
12. Straight out of Canton (Iron Wok Remix)

Another album, Hard Money, was due to be released in December 2006, but was delayed.

The Lunch Money EP was released in April 2007 under Cordless Recordings.

Track List:

1. Pimp It
2. No Good Muthabitch
3. Chinatown Hustler
4. Warlord
5. Last Showdown
6. Dim Sum Girl

They released their first full-length album Heavy Ghetto in May 2011

Track List:

1. Grandmaster
2. Red Tonight
3. Chinese Jeans
4. Hell Up In Hong Kong
5. Lunch Break
6. Shanghai Superfly
7. Schoolhousin'
8. Lonely G
9. Beef Street
10. This Is Rock N' Roll

Heavy Ghetto was also released in 12" Vinyl on November 25, 2011.

=== Singles ===
1. "Straight Out of Canton", whose name borrows from Straight Outta Compton by N.W.A. The single is different from the original version heard on Die Hungry, featuring new instrumental pieces.
2. "F.O.B. (Fresh off the Boat) For Life", a song boasting about their physical attributes and skills. This song is nowhere to be found on Die Hungry.
3. "Dim Sum Girl", a love ballad about the heartbreak of Hong Kong Fever from his former love, a dim sum girl (woman pushing around carts of dim sum in Chinese restaurants). It was featured in a Chinese reality television show.
4. "Kowloon Bay", a love ballad similar in flavor to Dim Sum Girl where Hong Kong Fever reminisces about his first love back in Kowloon Bay (a district in Hong Kong).
5. "Chinatown Hustler", a song about the life of a Chinatown gangster. This is also the single in which The Hunan Bomb is first heard. The music video officially aired on August 14, 2006. It is found on the video game original soundtrack of Wet
6. "Traditional Roughnecks"
7. "Old Shanghai" This song has been very hard to locate, since it was made very early on in the formation of Notorious MSG. Drinking a cup of Oolong Tea ("For days of Old Shanghai my dear, For days of Old Shanghai, We'll drink a cup of oolong tea, For the days of Old Shanghai") is the main action that is performed in the song's lyrics.

=== Music videos ===
1. "Straight Out of Canton", their first music video, features scenes of working in the kitchen and raising hell in the streets of the Chinatown ghetto.
2. "Chinatown Hustler", features the life of a Chinatown gangster. It's a hard life when you're driving a pimpin' car around town, selling drugs, breaking up gambling parties and cavorting with ladies of the night.
3. "Red Tonight" features the Notorious MSG jamming in a Chinatown rock club, along with a group of hard-partying friends.
4. "Wonton Violence" has them dressed in leather and sunglasses showing off how tough they are in a martial arts gym.

== Schoolhousin' videos ==
A web series on lessons from the Chinatown hood, as told by the Notorious MSG. All videos can be viewed on the band's YouTube channel.

1. Schoolhousin': The MSG Web Series - Intro to the new "Schoolhousin'" web series
2. Episode 1: "For the Ladies" - Get schooled on how to attract the ladies. It's an illustrated guide on how true beauty comes from within.
3. Episode 2: "Dirty Deeds" - An important lesson about dating and the details that are shared amongst friends/bruthas/Chinatown pimps. When is it too much?
4. Schoolhousin': A Halloween Special - Turn off the lights, grab the Holy water and be prepared to learn a lesson in fear, Chinatown style!
5. Episode 3: "Chinatown Chat" - This lesson will address some of the issues one must face to successfully grease your noodle without disturbing the other cooks in the kitchen.
6. Episode 4: "Stress is for Suckas" - This episode documents the raw and brutal reality that many pimps have had to face in times of great stress.
7. Schoolhousin' Safety: Look Before You Cook - Get schooled on why dancing like a freak in the kitchen isn't always a good idea.
8. Episode 5: "Apple Jackin'" - When your roommates eat your Apple Jacks without permission, they must be punished swiftly and without mercy. This is how to survive in the Chinatown hood.
9. Episode 6: "Egg Rollin'" - The MSG are about to blaze up their "family recipe" egg-rolls. When three unsuspecting ladies (The Gyoza Girls) arrive on the scene the recipe becomes one for disaster.
