= Børns =

American singer-songwriter (born 1992)

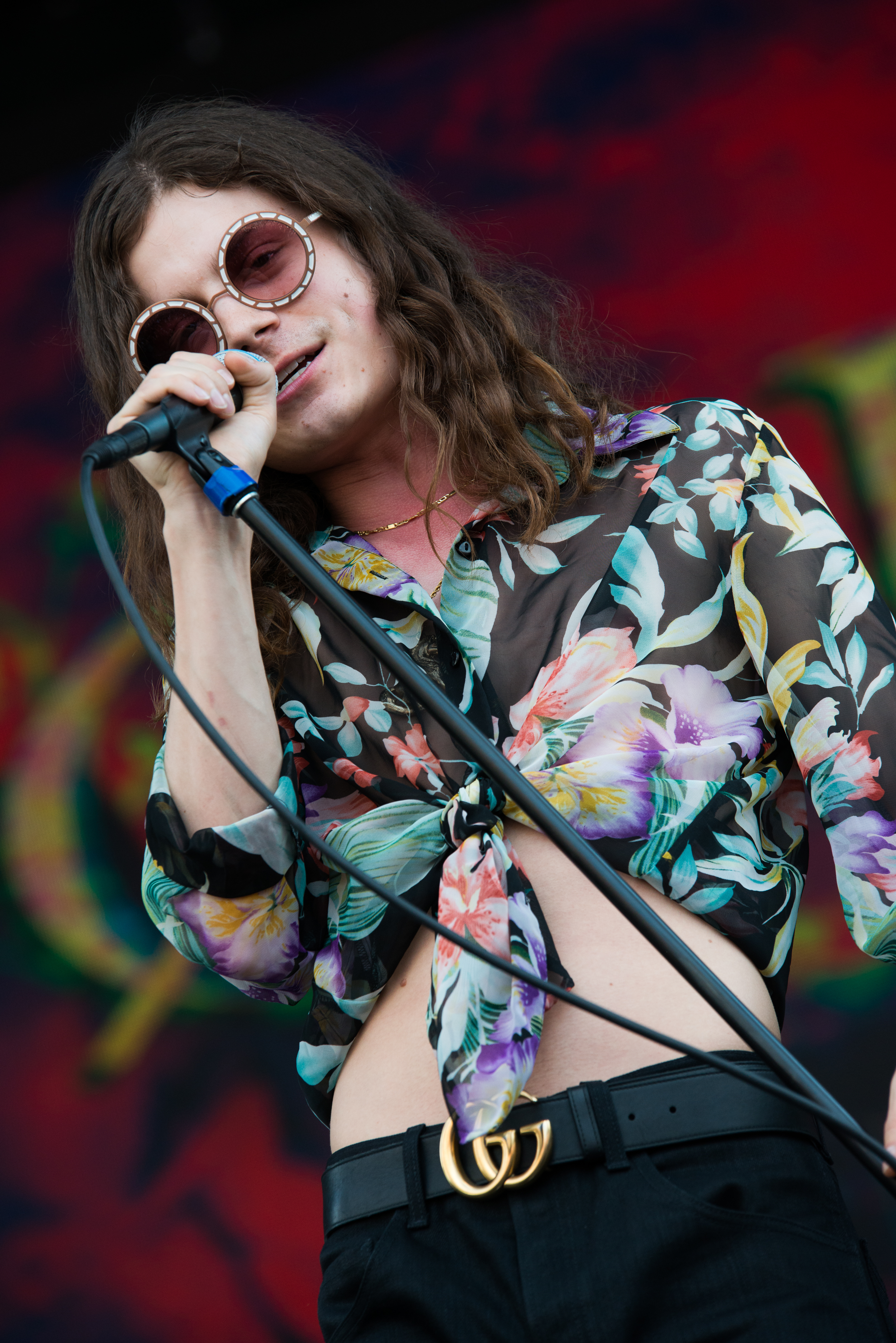
- Børns performing at day two of Boston Calling, May 2016

Background information
- Born: Garrett Clark Borns; January 7, 1992 (age 34); Muskegon, Michigan, U.S.
- Origin: Grand Haven, Michigan, U.S.
- Genres: Glam rock; electropop
- Occupations: Singer; songwriter; multi-instrumentalist
- Instruments: Vocals; guitar; piano; keyboards; ukulele
- Years active: 2012–2018; 2023–present
- Labels: REZidual; Interscope; Beautiful Glamorous
- Website: borns.com

Garrett Clark Borns (born January 7, 1992), better known by his stage name Børns (stylized in all caps), is an American singer, songwriter, and multi-instrumentalist.

Born and raised in Grand Haven, Michigan, Børns began performing in his youth. In 2012, he released his debut album, A Dream Between, through REZidual Records. His first major label release was the Candy EP (2014), through Geffen and Interscope. The EP peaked at number two on the Billboard Heatseekers chart. The Dopamine tour followed, preceding his debut studio album Dopamine in 2015. The album was a commercial success, peaking at number 24 in the US and generating numerous singles include the platinum-certified, "Electric Love". Børns then embarked on tours with artists including Charli XCX, Bleachers, and Halsey, as a supporting act, along with a set at the Coachella Valley Music and Arts Festival in 2016. His second album, Blue Madonna, was released on January 12, 2018. The record spawned several singles, including "God Save Our Young Blood" with Lana Del Rey, which charted on the US rock chart. To further promote the LP, he headlined the MoneyMan Tour (2017–18) and supported Del Rey on her LA to the Moon Tour. Børns released his third EP titled Suddenly in July 2023.

== Early life and education ==
Borns was born in Michigan and grew up in Grand Haven.

At the age of 10, he was paid to perform as a magician known as "Garrett the Great" at parties. At the age of 13, a seventh-grade student at White Pines Middle School, he received a Gold Key Award in the National Scholastic Art Awards along with an $8,000 college scholarship to the Kendall College of Art and Design (a part of Ferris State University) in Grand Rapids for his drawings and visual art. At the age of 14, he studied at Michigan's Interlochen Center for the Arts' summer program.

Børns also associated with filmmaking during his adolescence. He attended Grand Haven High School and went on to both take classes in classical piano at Grand Rapids Community College and study jazz at Muskegon Community College.

== Career ==
=== 2012–14: A Dream Between and Candy EPs ===
During his time in high school, Børns briefly performed in a cover band known as "Brown Chicken Brown Trout". The group performed at the Waterfront Film Festival in 2010.

In 2012, Børns performed with a guitarist and a drummer in The Garrett Borns Trio. Børns and his fellow band members collaborated on the early EP A Dream Between., featuring several of Børns' earliest tracks, one of which was his single "Mitten". The album was recorded in the private studio of Bill Chrysler.

Børns, managed by filmmaker Jeff Joanisse, was later signed to REZidual Records under the name Garrett Borns and took part in a TEDx event, performing a variety of music on his ukulele and showcasing his films from Paris. In 2013, Børns took a vacation from New York City, where he was living, to Los Angeles. Within weeks of relocating, Børns co-wrote his single "10,000 Emerald Pools" with producer Jack Kennedy.

=== 2015–2017: Dopamine and touring ===
On November 10, 2014, Børns released his debut single, "10,000 Emerald Pools", on Interscope Records and also his debut EP, Candy. He made several television appearances and performed "10,000 Emerald Pools" on a number of talk shows, including Conan and Le Before du Grand Journal in France on March 5, 2015. He toured in support of MisterWives on MisterWives' Our Own House Tour. On June 24, 2015, he played a headlining show at the Electrowerkz in London. In July and August, Børns accompanied Charli XCX and Bleachers on their "Charli and Jack Do America Tour" and performed at Lollapalooza on July 31, 2015. He also appeared at Life Is Beautiful festival and the Austin City Limits Music Festival in October. At many concerts, Børns also performs songs entitled "Broke" and "Let You Down", which were never released on an album nor deemed as singles.

On May 6, 2015, Børns' Vevo channel on YouTube released a music video accompanying his new single "Electric Love", placing as his most viewed song to date with well over 100 million views. On August 17, 2015, Børns' debut studio album, Dopamine, featuring "Electric Love" and its cover art were revealed, while the release date for Dopamine was confirmed as October 16, 2015. On September 15, 2015, Børns' performance at the Iridium Jazz Club in New York City was filmed by the American Public Broadcasting Service (PBS) for its Front and Center concert series airing nationwide in February 2016. Børns performed at the Coachella Valley Music and Arts Festival 2016. He also appeared as a featured artist in "Fool's Gold" by Dagny for her EP Ultraviolet.

=== 2017–2023: Blue Madonna and hiatus ===
On July 28, 2017, Børns released the single "Faded Heart" through Interscope, which was featured on the FIFA 18 Soundtrack, and in the movie Flatliners (2017). Then on September 29, 2017, Børns released his next single, "Sweet Dreams". Two promotional videos, "The Search for the Lost Sounds" and "The Faded Heart Sessions", were released on his YouTube channel along with the singles. After releasing his third single, "I Don't Want U Back", Børns released another promotional short entitled "Money Man Tour". The fourth and final single is "God Save Our Young Blood" featuring Lana Del Rey, who also provided background vocals for the song "Blue Madonna", and whose sister provided photography for the album covers.

Børns' second album, Blue Madonna, was officially released on January 12, 2018.

Following multiple allegations of sexual misconduct, Børns went on an indefinite hiatus in September 2018; his sole appearance since then came in September 2020, when his cover of the T. Rex song "Dawn Storm" appeared on the tribute album AngelHeaded Hipster: The Songs of Marc Bolan and T.Rex.

=== 2023–present: Suddenly and Honeybee EPs ===
On July 10, 2023, Børns announced his third EP titled Suddenly, which was released on July 28.

On October 25, 2024, Børns released "Letting Myself Go" as a single. The song "Grateful For" was released on December 7 as the second single for Børns' EP Honeybee, released on January 17, 2025.

== Personal life ==
After Børns wore a Gucci-inspired outfit on The Tonight Show Starring Jimmy Fallon, Gucci took notice of the singer, and the two have since formed a partnership. Børns is a participant in a "gender-bender" movement, by flaunting nail polish and crop-tops on social media and during performances. He admits that his androgynous vocals and appearance have led many to mistake him for a woman at first listen.

Børns met his close friend Zella Day in Los Angeles, and the two have collaborated on numerous projects. Day made appearances in videos on Børns' Vevo channel, and in turn has included him in videos of her own, in her DayxDay series, for example. The two were previously roommates.

Before the release of his first album Dopamine, Børns moved to Los Angeles, where he still resided as of January 2018. Børns is vegetarian like other members of his family.

=== Allegations of sexual misconduct ===
In September 2018, Børns was accused of sexual misconduct by several young women, leading to a Washington D.C. music festival named All Things Go Fall Classic dropping him from its lineup. The allegations against Børns included manipulation, grooming, and sexual aggression toward underaged fans, with the youngest accuser detailing her account of the alleged abuse which began when she was 16 years old. Børns released a statement calling the allegations "disturbing and false", also saying that "All of the relationships I have had were legal and consensual. They ended abruptly and that obviously caused hurt feelings, but for anyone to suggest anything beyond that is irresponsible." The young women took to Twitter to recount their alleged experiences of being manipulated by him.

In February 2024, Børns, now an independent artist, released a second statement regarding the allegations, acknowledging and apologizing for having "brief relationships" with fans while on tour and denying all allegations of grooming; he emphasized that the relationships were consensual and "the accusations implying otherwise are extremely damaging and false, and I've lived with the effect of them for years."

== Discography ==
- Dopamine (2015)
- Blue Madonna (2018)

== Concert tours ==
Headlining

- Dopamine Tour (2015)
- Summer Tour 2016 (2016)
- Fall 2017 Tour (2017)
- Money Man Tour (2017–18)
- Fruit of Dreams Tour (2018–19)
- The Decade of Dopamine Tour (2025)

Supporting

- MisterWives – Our Own House Tour (2015)
- Charli XCX & Bleachers – Charli and Jack Do America Tour (2015)
- Years & Years - Fall 2015 Tour (2015)
- Halsey – Badlands Tour (2016)
- The Lumineers – Cleopatra World Tour (2016)
- Mumford & Sons – An Arrow Through the Heartland Tour (2016)
- Lana Del Rey – LA to the Moon Tour (2018)

== Filmography ==
=== Web ===
Year	Film	Roles	Notes
2007	What a Relief	Peter	Comedy short
2008	Lake Michigan	Marcus Gates	Comedy short
2011	TEDx Talks	Himself	Episode: TEDxGrandRapids - Garrett Borns - Musician
2014	DayxDay	Himself	Episode: "Moon Face"
2017	The Search for the Lost Sounds	Himself	Promotional short
2017	Money Man Tour	Himself	Promotional short
2017	BØRNS (The Offset Film SeriesFender)	Himself	Promotional short for Fender
2018	Touch of Lightning: A Shocking Parable of Work & Play	Himself	Promotional short

== See also ==
- List of indie pop artists
- List of people from Michigan
- List of singer-songwriters
