= Shaky Knees Music Festival =

Music festival in Atlanta, Georgia, United States

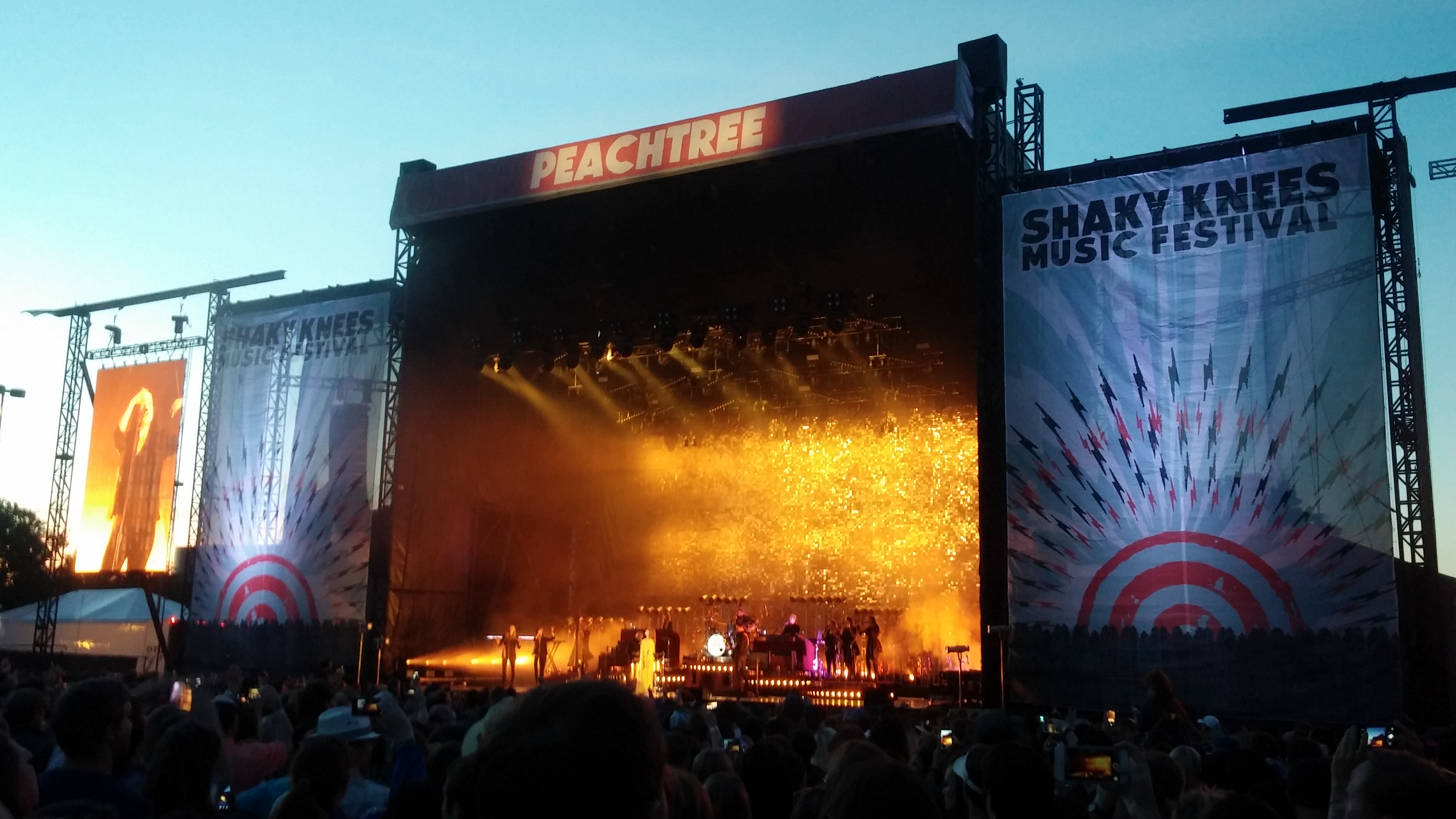
- Shaky Knees in 2016
- Genre: Rock
- Dates: September 18–20, 2026 (currently)
- Locations: Historic Fourth Ward Park and Masquerade Music Park, Atlanta, Georgia (2013); Atlantic Station (2014); Central Park (2015); Centennial Olympic Park (2016-2017); Central Park (2018 - 2024); Piedmont Park (2025-present)
- Years active: 2013-present
- Founders: Tim Sweetwood
- Website: www.shakykneesfestival.com

Shaky Knees Music Festival is an annual indie and rock music festival held in Atlanta, Georgia. Founded in 2013 by Tim Sweetwood, the festival was created to bring a dedicated indie rock event to the city. It is currently held in Piedmont Park and features international and regional artists across multiple days.

Sister festivals, Shaky Boots and Shaky Beats, were introduced in 2015 and 2016 to focus on country and electronic dance music, respectively. The festival is currently held in Piedmont Park in Midtown Atlanta.

== History ==
Tim Sweetwood, a booking agent for Masquerade Music Park in Atlanta, introduced the festival in 2013. The name comes from the song "Steam Engine" by My Morning Jacket, a band of which Sweetwood is a fan. Sweetwood founded the festival to fill a gap he saw in the Atlanta music scene, where preexisting festivals did not carry the types of artists that Shaky Knees now hosts. In an interview with the music magazine Consequence of Sound, Sweetwood stated that he envisioned Shaky Knees as a festival focused purely on music, as opposed to similar festivals like the Coachella Valley Music and Arts Festival, which has attractions other than musical acts. Going into the future, he says he wants to continue to develop the brand, but maintain the festival at a smaller size than other festivals like Bonnaroo and Coachella to ensure that all of the festival's attendees can enjoy the experience.

The first installment of the festival was held over two days in mid-May in Historic Fourth Ward Park and Masquerade Music Park. The festival drew acts such as The Lumineers, Jim James, and Band of Horses. The festival sold out and had around 9,000 attendees per day.

In following years, the festival relocated from Historic Fourth Ward Park, but remained in Atlanta. Sweetwood has stated that a goal of the festival is to remain within the city in a place that is accessible to local and traveling attendees. In its second year, the festival moved to Atlantic Station, a neighborhood that was designed and redeveloped in 2005, and expanded to three days. In 2015, the festival moved to Atlanta's Central Park and expanded its capacity to around 40,000. In 2016, the festival moved to Centennial Olympic Park, where it remained through 2017. In 2018-19 it returned to Central Park. The 2025 festival moved to Piedmont Park.

== Accolades ==
In 2015, Shaky Knees ranked fourth on the USA Today nationwide list of the "10 Best Readers Choice: Best Music Festivals." Rolling Stone magazine listed Shaky Knees as one of its "50 Must-See Music Festivals" of summer 2015.

== Sister Festivals ==
Over time, the founders of Shaky Knees introduced similar festivals exploring different genres of music.

=== Shaky Boots Music Festival ===
In 2015, Sweetwood introduced Shaky Boots, a music festival centered around country music, because there was no major country music festival in Georgia. The festival took place over two days and included artists such as Blake Shelton, Brad Paisley, Dierks Bentley, Rascal Flatts, and Old Crow Medicine Show. The festival was the first major multiple-day country music festival to be held in the state of Georgia. The festival went on hiatus in 2016.

=== Shaky Beats Music Festival ===
Shaky Beats Music Festival began in 2016 and took place in Centennial Olympic Park the weekend following Shaky Knees. In its inaugural year, it featured EDM acts such as Odesza, Major Lazer, Big Gigantic, Porter Robinson, and Carnage. In 2017, it included acts such as The Chainsmokers, Kaskade, GRiZ, Flosstradamus, and Zeds Dead.

== Lineups By Year ==
=== 2013 ===
Saturday: Band of Horses, Jim James, J Roddy Walston & the Business, Gary Clark Jr., The Orwells, Lucero, The Joy Formidable, Hanni El Khatib, Moon Taxi, Vintage Trouble, Roadkill Ghost Choir, You Me and Apollo, Robert Ellis, Death on Two Wheels, Tumbleweed Wanderers, Goat, The Black Angels

Sunday: The Lumineers, Drive by Truckers, The Antlers, Dr. Dog, Kurt Vile & the Violators, Delta Spirit, Oberhofer, Delta Spirit, The Heartless Bastards, Murder by Death, Shovels & Rope, Frontier Ruckus, T. Hardy Morris, Swear & Shake, Von Grey

=== 2014 ===
Friday: The National, Spoon, The Gaslight Anthem, Cage the Elephant, Dropkick Murphys, Foals, The Airborne Toxic Event, Band of Skulls, Graveyard, Charles Bradley & His Extraordinaires, Man Man, White Denim, Wild Belle, The Whigs, Bright Light Social Hour, Sleeper Agent, American Aquarium, Mutual Benefit, Blood Red Shoes

Saturday: Modest Mouse, The Replacements, Portugal. The Man, Conor Oberst, Dawes, Jenny Lewis, Cold War Kids, Lord Huron, Tokyo Police Club, The Lone Bellow, Hayes Carll, Gregory Alan Isakov, Houndmouth, Apache Relay, Wake Owl, Packway Handle Band, Fly Golden Eagle, Phox, The Districts

Sunday: Alabama Shakes, Edward Sharp and the Magnetic Zeros, Local Natives, Violent Femmes, Iron & Wine, Trampled by Turtles, Jason Isbell, Deer Tick, The Hold Steady, Blitzen Trapper, Langhorne Slim, Mason Jennings, San Fermin, Kopecky Family Band, Jackie Greene, The Weeks, Paper Bird, Crass Mammoth, Benjamin Booker

=== 2015 ===
Friday: The Strokes, Pixies, Brand New, Mastodon, TV on the Radio, James Blake, Manchester Orchestra, Death From Above 1979, American Football, Kaiser Chiefs, Mac DeMarco, The Kooks, Wavves, The Mountain Goats, Zella Day, Tennis, Halsey, Mitski, Surfer Blood, Jukebox the Ghost, John Grant, Haerts, Black Pistol Fire, Blank Range

Saturday: The Avett Brothers, Wilco, Noel Gallagher’s High Flying Birds, Interpol, Neutral Milk Hotel, Social Distortion, Flogging Molly, Milky Chance, ZZ Ward, Built to Spill, The Devil Makes Three, Real Estate, The Black Lips, FIDLAR, Metz, The Bronx, Palma Violets, Speedy Ortiz, Viet Cong, Kevin Devine, Hey Rosetta!, Field Report, Mariachi El Bronx, The Whiskey Gentry

Sunday: Tame Impala, Ryan Adams, Ride, Old Crow Medicine Show, Dr. Dog, Spiritualized, Trombone Shorty & Orleans Avenue, Panda Bear, Xavier Rudd, Best Coast, Frank Turner, The Both, Minus the Bear, Old 97’s, Heartless Bastards, The Sheepdogs, Preservation Hall Jazz Band, Matthew E. White, Nikki Lane, Steve Gunn, The Mowgli’s, Fences

=== 2016 ===
Friday: Jane's Addiction, The 1975, Bloc Party, Ghost, The Kills, Slowdive, Savages, Cold War Kids, Against Me!, Wolf Alice, Crystal Fighters, The Sword, Baroness, The Struts, Alex G, The Front Bottoms, Brian Fallon, Kaleo, Craig Finn, The Japanese House, Saintseneca, Foxing, Beach Slang, David Ramirez

Saturday: My Morning Jacket, Walk the Moon, Foals, The Decemberists, Huey Lewis & the News, Silversun Pickups, LANY, Phosphorescent, Wild Nothing, Deer Tick, Shakey Graves, Noah Gundersen, JJ Grey & Mofro, Baskery, The Vaccines, The Dear Hunter, Day Wave, The Hip Abduction, Drew Holcomb & The Neighbors, Hop Along, Strand of Oaks, Son Little, Polyenso

Sunday: Florence + the Machine, At the Drive‑In, Explosions in the Sky, Young the Giant, Deftones, The Head and the Heart, Eagles of Death Metal, Unknown Mortal Orchestra, Parquet Courts, The Black Angels, Nothing, Houndmouth, St. Paul & The Broken Bones, Atlas Genius, Adia Victoria, Ought, COIN, Julien Baker, Caveman, The Shelters

=== 2017 ===
Friday: LCD Soundsystem, Pixies, Cage the Elephant, Portugal. The Man, Wolf Parade, Highly Suspect, Twin Peaks, PUP, FIDLAR, Preoccupations, Car Seat Headrest, Pinegrove, The Growlers, Margaret Glaspy, Rainbow Kitten Surprise, Lo Moon, The London Souls, Zipper Club, Frank Carter and the Rattlesnakes, Cymbals Eat Guitars, Tyler Bryant & the Shakedown

Saturday: The xx, X Ambassadors, Nick Murphy, Moon Taxi, Sylvan Esso, Fantastic Negrito, Dr. Dog, Catfish and the Bottlemen, The Revivalists, Shovels & Rope, Run River North, Mariachi El Bronx, Foreign Air, The Record Company, Public Access T.V., Amythyst Kiah, Flagship

Sunday: Phoenix, The Shins, Ryan Adams, Third Eye Blind, Bleachers, Pond, Ron Gallo, Fruit Bats, J Roddy Walston and The Business, Arkells, Hamilton Leithauser, Saint Motel, Whitney, Cloud Nothings, HOOPS, The Quaker City Night Hawks

=== 2018 ===
Friday: Jack White, David Byrne, Fleet Foxes, Courtney Barnett, Japandroids, Franz Ferdinand, Jimmy Eat World, The Black Angels, Rival Sons, The Brian Jonestown Massacre, Waxahatchee, Ezra Furman, The Frights, Lillie Mae, Rolling Blackouts Coastal Fever, Welles, The War and Treaty, L.A. Witch, Liz Brasher, *repeat repeat, Amasa Hines

Saturday: Queens of the Stone Age, The War on Drugs, Cake, Manchester Orchestra, Matt and Kim, The Distillers, Parquet Courts, Circa Survive, Greta Van Fleet, Chicano Batman, Andrew W.K., Jacob Banks, TORRES, Broncho, Bully, Charly Bliss, Mikky Ekko, Bayonne, The Night Game, The Sherlocks, Stop Light Observations, Sun Seeker

Sunday: The National, Tenacious D, Vance Joy, Nathaniel Rateliff & the Night Sweats, Lord Huron, The Voidz, All Time Low, Black Rebel Motorcycle Club, Alvvays, Sir Sly, The Menzingers, Basement, Lukas Nelson & Promise of the Real, Parcels, Alice Merton, Mt. Joy, The Wild Reeds, Post Animal, Frankie Rose, Tedo Stone

=== 2019 ===
Friday: Beck, Incubus, Tears for Fears, Tash Sultana, Dashboard Confessional, Liz Phair, Sharon Van Etten, Osees, Black Lips, IDLES, Foxing, Yellow Days, The Joy Formidable, Peach Pit, Devon Gilfillian, Wilderado, Low Cut Connie, Hannah Wicklund & The Steppin Stones, Duncan Fellows, Taylor Janzen

Saturday: Cage The Elephant, Gary Clark Jr., Interpol, Jim James, The Struts, FIDLAR, The Dandy Warhols, Bad Books, Japanese Breakfast, Wallows, Soccer Mommy, Mark Lanegan, Jade Bird, Pedro the Lion, Natalie Prass, Mipso, Cleopatrick, Ruen Brothers, Bones Owens, Liily, Walden

Sunday: Tame Impala, Foals, Maggie Rogers, Grouplove, Phosphorescent, Tyler Childers, Deerhunter, HONNE, Calpurnia, Electric Guest, Caamp, Rayland Baxter, The Murlocs, Lucy Dacus, Slothrust, Welshly Arms, Demob Happy, The Blue Stones, The Nude Party, Illiterate Light, The Inspector Cluzo

=== 2021 ===
Friday: Foo Fighters, St. Vincent, Mac Demarco, Dermot Kennedy, Dominic Fike, Ty Segall & Freedom Band, Jay Electronica, White Reaper, Noga Erez, Black Pistol Fire, Cults, Peach Tree Rascals, Local H, Ayron Jones, Amigo the Devil, Forgivers, Frankie and the Witch Fingers, Parker Gispert, Tejon Street Corner Thieves, Leon of Athens, Specialists

Saturday: Run the Jewels, Alice Cooper, Portugal. The Man, Royal Blood, Idles, The Hives, Living Colour, Larkin Poe, Arlo Parks, KennyHoopla, Mammoth WVH, Mercury Rev, Lunar Vacation, Suki Waterhouse, Cloud Nothings, Neal Francis, Carlie Hanson, Liza Anne, Geese, Kid Sistr, Quinton Brock, The Alive, The Lowcountry Jukes

Sunday: The Strokes, Modest Mouse, Phoebe Bridgers, O.A.R., Orville Peck, All Them Witches, The Aces, Tennis, The Backseat Lovers, Ritt Momney, Delta Spirit, The Brook & the Bluff, Black Midi, Joy Oladokun, The Aubreys, Michigander, Bartees Strange, Lowertown, Songs for Kids

=== 2022 ===
Friday: Green Day, Billy Idol, Rainbow Kitten Surprise, Spoon, Highly Suspect, Lennon Stella, Godspeed You! Black Emperor, Biffy Clyro, Grandson, Shannon and the Clams, Faye Webster, Barns Courtney, Sports Team, Nilufer Yanya, Mannequin Pussy, Flipturn, Motherfolk, Ultra Q, Ada Lea, Acid Dad, Little Image, Leon of Athens

Saturday: Nine Inch Nails, Chvrches, King Gizzard & the Lizard Wizard, Mt. Joy, Kurt Vile & the Violators, Japanese Breakfast, Gang of Youths, The Regrettes, Gerry Cinnamon, Guided by Voices, Djo, Amyl and the Sniffers, Reignwolf, Phantom Planet, Babyjake, Molchat Doma, Dehd, Hunny, Poorstacy, Pretty Sick, Chastity Belt, Francis of Delirium, Exum

Sunday: My Morning Jacket, Khruangbin, Death Cab for Cutie, Band of Horses, The Glorius Sons, Coin, PUP, The Garden, Colony House, The Happy Fits, Dirty Honey, Destroyer, Stephen Day, Angel Dust, Girlpuppy, Lanie Gardner, Pinkshift, Briscoe, Spiritual Cramp, Songs for Kids

=== 2023 ===
Friday: The Killers, Greta Van Fleet, Yeah Yeah Yeahs, Cypress Hill, Manchester Orchestra, Grouplove, Placebo, Surf Curse, Digable Planets, Be Your Own Pet, Peaches, Spacey Jane, Copeland, Lovejoy, Matt Maltese, Illuminati Hotties, Charlotte Sands, Gringo Star, Arlie, Mom Rock, Desure

Saturday: Muse, Tenacious D, The Mars Volta, The Gaslight Anthem, Phantogram, The Front Bottoms, Suki Waterhouse, Futurebirds, Soccer Mommy, Wilderado, Babe Rainbow, Shame, Beach Weather, Joey Valence & Brae, Cafune, Heartless Bastards, Sunflower Bean, Olivia Jean, Daisy the Great, Me nd Adam, Rickshaw Billie's Burger Patrol, Tanukichan

Sunday: The Lumineers, Hozier, The Flaming Lips, Father John Misty, Future Islands, Live, The Walkmen, The Black Angels, Fidlar, Pond, Sun Room, Wunderhorse, Puma Blue, The Aquadolls, Off!, Taipei Houston, Water From Your Eyes, Trash Panda, Songs for Kids

=== 2024 ===
Friday: Noah Kahan, Arcade Fire, Young the Giant, Interpol, The Revivalists, Yves Tumor, Metric, All Them Witches, Switchfoot, Del Water Gap, Pond, Psychedelic Porn Crumpets, Late Night Drive Home, Maserati, Ax and the Hatchetmen, Wine Lips, Odie Leigh, Ray Bull, Linka Moja, Winona Fighter, Mali Velasquez, 2007, Songs for Kids

Saturday: Weezer, Queens of the Stone Age, The Offspring, Girl in Red, Miike Snow, Royal Blood, Sunny Day Real Estate, Palace, Holly Humberstone, Chicano Batman, Microwave, Dexter and the Moonrocks, Quarters of Change, Dead Poet Society, Friday Pilots Club, Lido Pimienta, Blondshell, Bad Nerves, Tigercub, Pool Kids, Grace Cummings, Been Stellar, The Inspector Cluzo, Songs for Kids

Sunday: Foo Fighters, Billy Idol, Portugal. The Man, Men I trust, Dinosaur Jr., Waxahatchee, Matt and Kim, The Struts, Kevin Morby, Christone "Kingfish" Ingram, Loveless, Royel Otis, Nova Twins, Arcy Drive, Fazerdaze, Benches, Eric Slick, Certainly So, Lamont Landers, Songs for Kids

=== 2025 ===
Friday: Deftones, Lenny Kravitz, Sublime, The Marias, Pixies, Idles, Spoon, Inhaler, Joey Valence & Brae, Lambrini Girls, Sarah Kinsley

Saturday: My Chemical Romance, Cage The Elephant, The Black Keys, Public Enemy, The Backseat Lovers, TV on the Radio, The All-American Rejects, Johnny Marr, The Beaches, The Linda Lindas, Bilmuri, CMAT, Scowl, Michigander, Fat Dog, Hey, Nothing, Radio Free Alice, Die Spitz, Soft Play, Ecca Vandal, Girl Tones, Junior Varsity, Songs for Kids

Sunday: Blink-182, Vampire Weekend, Alabama Shakes, Lucy Dacus, Devo, Wet Leg, 4 Non Blondes, Franz Ferdinand, Stereophonics, The Stews, Fleshwater, Murder by Death, Mdou Moctar, Improvement Movement, English Teacher, The Criticals, Worry Club, Songs for Kids

Special Guest: "Weird Al" Yankovic

=== 2026 ===
Friday: The Strokes, Turnstile, Fontaines D.C., Geese, Danny Elfman, Hot Mulligan, Snow Strippers, Ben Howard, Alice Phoebe Lou, Goldford, Cartel

Saturday: Twenty One Pilots, Pierce The Veil, The Prodigy, Pavement, Jimmy Eat World, Blood Orange, Peach Pit, Taking Back Sunday, Minus The Bear, Wolf Alice, The Rapture, Congress The Band, Psychedelic Porn Crumpets, Geordie Greep, Elio Mei, Villanelle, Cruz Beckham, Rehash, Rum Jungle, The Inspector Cluzo, Hotel Fiction, Sophie's Body, Songs For Kids

Sunday: Gorillaz, LCD Soundsystem, Wu-Tang-Clan, Knocked Loose, Modest Mouse, Japanese Breakfast, Santigold, Coheed and Cambria, Jet, Ok Go, Fcukers, American Hi-Fi, The Two Lips, Violet Grohl, Cardinals, Big Special, Porch Light, Showing Teeth, Garbagebarbie, Songs for Kids
