= 2018 Bonnaroo Music Festival =

The 2018 Bonnaroo Music Festival was held June 7 to 10, 2018 in Manchester, Tennessee. This marked the seventeenth consecutive festival since its inception in 2002. It was projected that 76,000 people attended the festival across the weekend. The headliners were rapper Eminem, rock bands The Killers and Muse.

== Set lists ==
Here are the lists of songs performed at the 2018 Bonnaroo by the headliners.

Muse
1. "Thought Contagion"
2. "Psycho"
3. "Interlude"
4. "Hysteria"
5. "Plug In Baby"
6. "The 2nd Law: Unsustainable"
7. "Dig Down"
8. "Supermassive Black Hole"
9. "Stockholm Syndrome"
10. "Madness"
11. "Starlight"
12. "Time Is Running Out"
13. "Mercy"

Encore

14. "Take a Bow"
15. "Uprising"
16. "Knights of Cydonia"
Eminem
1. "Medicine Man"
2. "Won't Back Down"
3. "3 a.m."
4. "Square Dance"
5. "Kill You"
6. "White America"
7. "Rap God"
8. "Sing for the Moment"
9. "Like Toy Soldiers"
10. "Forever"
11. "Just Don't Give a Fuck"
12. "Framed"
13. "Criminal"
14. "The Way I Am"
15. "Walk on Water" (with Skylar Grey)
16. "Stan" (with Skylar Grey)
17. "Love the Way You Lie" (with Skylar Grey)
18. "Berzerk"
19. "'Till I Collapse"
20. "Cinderella Man"
21. "Fast Lane" (with Royce da 5'9")
22. "River"
23. "The Monster"
24. "Nowhere Fast"
25. "My Name Is"
26. "The Real Slim Shady"
27. "Without Me"
28. "Not Afraid"

Encore

29. "Lose Yourself"
The Killers
1. "Mr. Brightside"
2. "Spaceman"
3. "Somebody Told Me"
4. "The Way It Was"
5. "Shot at the Night"
6. "Run for Cover"
7. "Jenny Was a Friend of Mine"
8. "Smile Like You Mean It"
9. "For Reasons Unknown"
10. "Human"
11. "The Man"
12. "American Girl"
13. "A Dustland Fairytale"
14. "Runaways"
15. "Read My Mind"
16. "All These Things That I've Done"

Encore

17. "The Calling"
18. "When You Were Young"

== Line-ups ==
The information was obtained from BrooklynVegan website. Artists listed from earliest to latest set times.

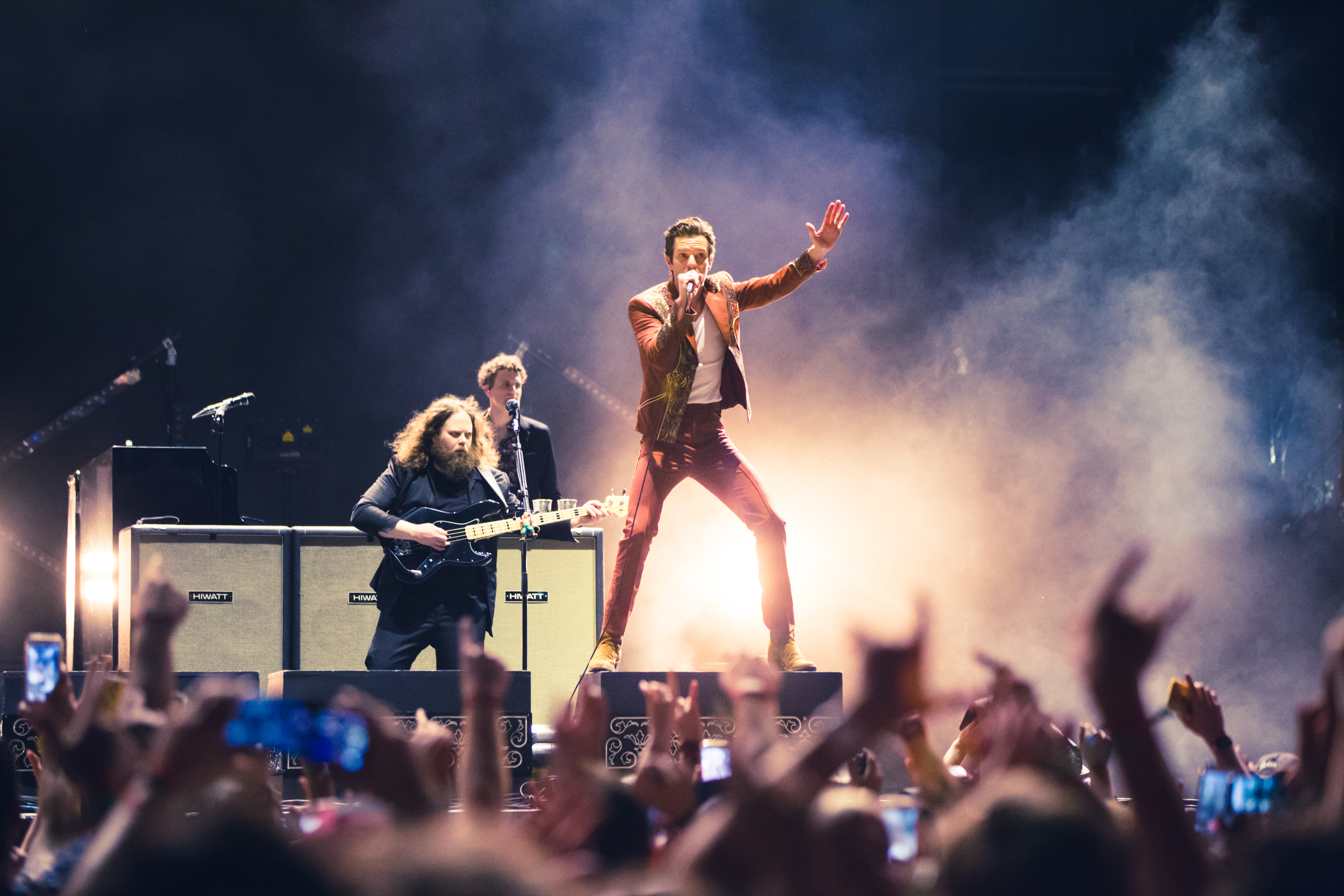
Headliner The Killers performing at the What Stage.

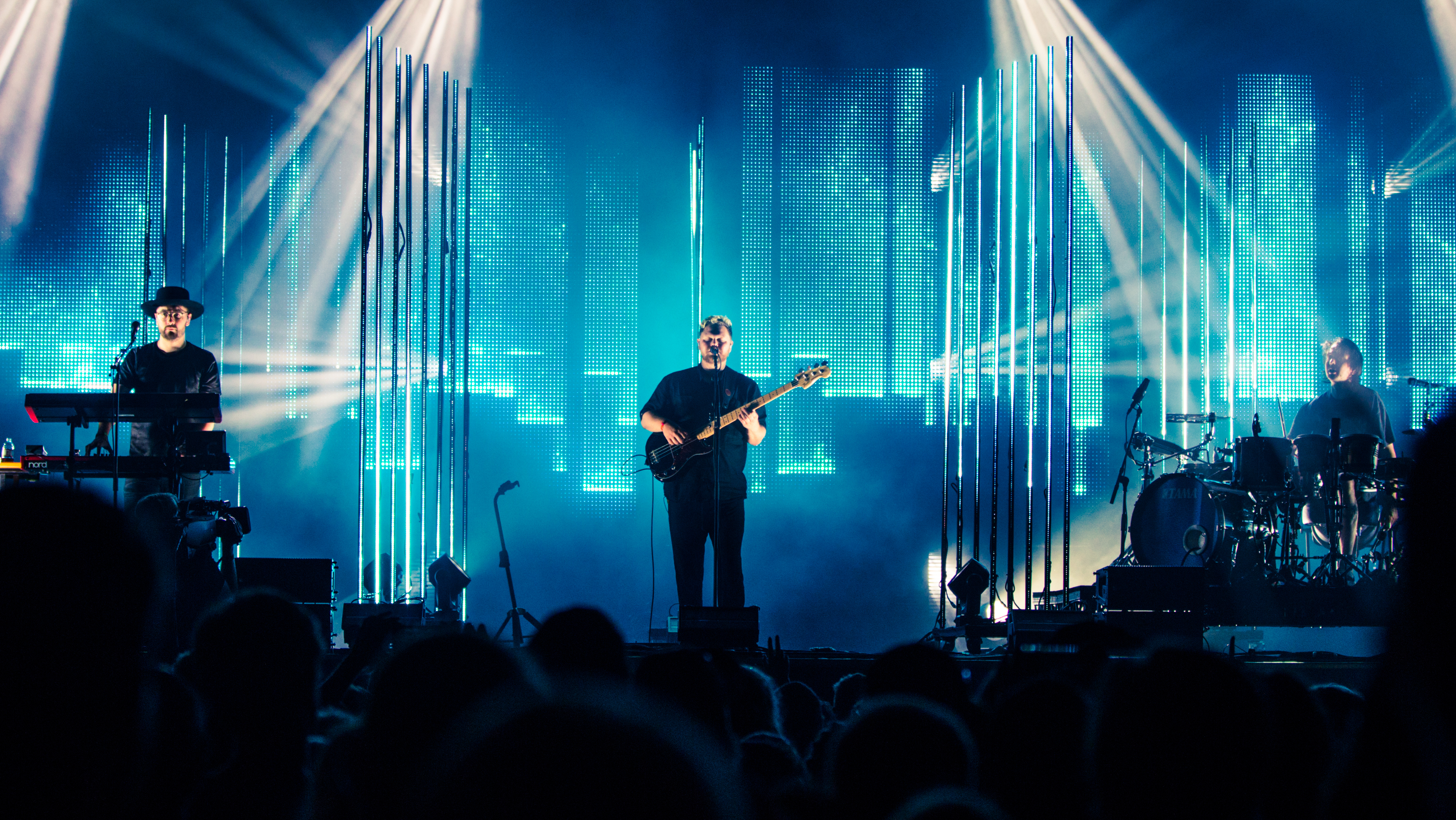
Alt-J performing at the Which Stage.

=== Thursday, June 7 ===
- This Tent: Blank Range, Cyn, Frenship, Chase Atlantic, Spafford, Elohim
- That Tent: Ron Gallo, Lissie, The Spencer Lee Band, Durand Jones & The Indications, R.LUM.R, Pigeons Playing Ping Pong
- The Other: Justin Jay's Fantastic Voyage, Clozee, Manic Focus, Space Jesus, Valentino Khan, Opiuo
- Who Stage: Dreamers, Arlie, Victory, Oliver Hazard, Jade Bird, Leven Kali
- New Music on Tap Lounge: The Brummies, Jalen N'Gonda, Flor, Spencer Ludwig, Topaz Jones

=== Friday, June 8 ===
- What Stage: Alex Lahey, Sheryl Crow, Paramore, Sturgill Simpson, Muse
- Which Stage: Bayonne, A R I Z O N A, Manchester Orchestra, The Revivalists, Khalid, Bassnectar
- This Tent: Westside Gunn + Conway, Japanese Breakfast, Trombone Shorty & Orleans Ave, Tash Sultana, Playboi Carti, SuperJam
- That Tent: Everything Everything, Tyler Childers, Denzel Curry, T-Pain, Rüfüs Du Sol, Chromeo
- The Other: Loudpvck, Said the Sky, K?d, Shiba San, Kayzo, Carnage, Snakehips, Virtual Self
- Who Stage: Davie, Jaira Burns, John Splithoff, Colin Elmore & The Danville Train, The Blue Stones, Okey Dokey
- New Music on Tap Lounge: The Foxies, The Norm, Low Cut Connie, Zeshan B, Kyle Dion

=== Saturday, June 9 ===
- What Stage: Moses Sumney, LANY, Nile Rodgers & Chic, Anderson .Paak & The Free Nationals, Eminem
- Which Stage: Lewis Capaldi, Billie Eilish, Mavis Staples, Old Crow Medicine Show, Bon Iver (two sets)
- This Tent: The War & Treaty, Pond, Midland, Rag'n'Bone Man, First Aid Kit, Sound Tribe Sector 9
- That Tent: Reggie Watts, Knox Fortune, Jessie Reyez, Kali Uchis, Sylvan Esso, Rebelution, Brockhampton
- The Other: Droeloe B2B Taska Black, Boogie T B2B Squnto, Chris Lake, Hippie Sabotage, Slander, The Glitch Mob, What So Not, Kaskade
- Who Stage: Saro, Larkin Poe, The Regrettes, Tobi Lou, Post Animal
- New Music on Tap Lounge: Matt Holubowski, Southern Avenue, Fletcher, Duckwrth, Matt Maeson

=== Sunday, June 10 ===
- What Stage: Brothers Osborne, Broken Social Scene, Dua Lipa, Future, The Killers
- Which Stage: Mikky Ekko, Rich Brian, Jungle, Moon Taxi, Alt-J
- This Tent: Bruno Major, Noura Mint Seymali, Sir Sly, GoGo Penguin, Daniel Caesar, Thundercat
- That Tent: Bazzi, Ikebe Shakedown, Amadou & Mariam, St. Paul and The Broken Bones, Grand Ole Opry
- The Other: Melvv, Mija B2B Billy Kenny, Mr. Carmack, Big Wild, Gryffin, Alison Wonderland
- Who Stage: Miller, Chastity Brown, *repeat repeat, Biyo, Colin Macleod
- New Music on Tap Lounge: Hundred Handed, Shey Baba, Michigan Rattlers, Michael Blume, The Texas Gentlemen
