= Oceans Calling =

Annual music festival in Ocean City, Maryland

Oceans Calling Festival
- Status: Active
- Genre: Rock, alternative rock, pop, roots rock, reggae rock
- Frequency: Annually (last weekend of September)
- Venue: Ocean City Inlet Beach and the Ocean City Boardwalk
- Locations: Ocean City, Maryland, United States
- Years active: 2023–present
- Inaugurated: September 29, 2023 (inaugural 2022 edition cancelled)
- Founder: O.A.R., C3 Presents
- Most recent: September 26–28, 2025
- Attendance: 162,000 (2025, three days)
- Organiser: C3 Presents
- Website: oceanscallingfestival.com

The Oceans Calling Festival (often shortened to Oceans Calling) is an annual three-day music festival held on the beach and boardwalk at the Ocean City Inlet in Ocean City, Maryland. It was created by the concert promoter C3 Presents in partnership with the Rockville, Maryland–founded rock band O.A.R., who perform at each edition, including a closing "O.A.R. and Friends" set. The festival takes place on the last weekend of September and features more than 40 acts across three stages, along with culinary demonstrations by celebrity chefs and access to the boardwalk and the Jolly Roger at The Pier, which sits inside the festival grounds.

The inaugural festival, scheduled for September 30 – October 2, 2022, was canceled the day before it was due to open because of the remnants of Hurricane Ian. The first edition was held in 2023, and the festival returned in 2024 and 2025, growing to become the largest ticketed music event in Ocean City's history. The 2026 edition was also cancelled because of a nor'easter.

== History ==
=== Founding and 2022 cancellation ===
Ocean City officials began working with the festival's promoters in May 2021. The lineup for the inaugural festival was announced in May 2022, with headliners Dave Matthews & Tim Reynolds, The Lumineers and Alanis Morissette, and more than 30 acts scheduled across three stages at the southern end of the boardwalk. Around 40,000 tickets were sold, and the stages, sound systems and vendors were in place when, on September 29, 2022, organizers cancelled the event because of unsafe conditions on the festival grounds and the forecast for high winds, tidal flooding and heavy rain from the remnants of Hurricane Ian. Tickets purchased through Front Gate Tickets were refunded. In November 2022 the Ocean City Mayor and Council approved C3 Presents' request to hold the same late-September weekend in 2023.

=== 2023–2025 ===
The first Oceans Calling Festival took place from September 29 to October 1, 2023, headlined by Jack Johnson, Alanis Morissette, John Mayer and The Lumineers, several of whom had been booked for the cancelled 2022 event. Organizers reported nearly 50,000 attendees on each day of the festival.

Following the 2023 edition, the Town of Ocean City signed a three-year agreement with C3 Presents that included date holds through 2026; the agreement also led to the creation of a sister event, the Country Calling Festival. The 2024 festival sold all 55,000 of its tickets, making it the largest ticketed music festival held in Ocean City up to that point. For 2025, the festival reported total attendance of about 162,000 over three days.

=== 2026 cancellation ===
The 2026 festival, scheduled for September 25–27 and headlined by Dave Matthews Band, Twenty One Pilots and Mumford & Sons, sold out. On September 24, 2026, organizers canceled the Friday program, saying continued weather and beach erosion had made it impossible to safely finish building the festival site. The following day, citing guidance from the National Weather Service and local officials about the strengthening September 2026 nor'easter, organizers canceled the remainder of the festival. It was the second time in four scheduled years that the festival had been called off before opening because of weather.

== Festival site ==
The festival grounds occupy Ocean City Inlet Beach and enclose the boardwalk south of North Division Street, with the Jolly Roger at the Pier amusement park inside the perimeter; admission to the amusement park is included with a festival ticket. The festival uses three stages; those used in 2024 and 2025 were the Sea Bright Stage, the Rockville Stage (named for O.A.R.'s hometown) and the Carousel Stage. Shuttle service runs from park-and-ride lots in West Ocean City and at the Ocean City Convention Center.

== Culinary program ==
Each edition has included a culinary stage with cooking demonstrations by celebrity chefs. Since 2023 the program has been hosted by actor Jason Biggs.

Year	Chefs
2022 (cancelled)	Andrew Zimmern, Robert Irvine, Amanda Freitag
2023	Robert Irvine, Amanda Freitag
2024	Robert Irvine, Amanda Freitag, Marc Murphy
2025	Robert Irvine, Michael Voltaggio, Bryan Voltaggio, Anne Burrell (announced)
2026 (cancelled)	Robert Irvine, Antonia Lofaso, Alex Guarnaschelli

== Attendance and economic impact ==
Year	Dates	Attendance	Notes
2022	September 30 – October 2	—	Cancelled; about 40,000 tickets sold
2023	September 29 – October 1	Nearly 50,000 per day	Inaugural edition
2024	September 27–29	55,000 (sold out)	Rain from the remnants of Hurricane Helene on Friday
2025	September 26–28	About 162,000 total	More than 50,000 tickets sold each day
2026	September 25–27	—	Sold out; cancelled due to September 2026 nor'easterr

Ocean City officials have described the festival as a major economic driver for the town's autumn "shoulder season". Before the 2023 edition, the town projected an economic impact of more than $30 million, and said more than 60 percent of attendees were expected to be first-time visitors. According to the town, an independent study found that the 2024 Oceans Calling and Country Calling festivals together generated $376.3 million in economic impact. After the 2025 festivals, Ocean City's tourism director estimated a combined impact of around $300 million, pending a third-party analysis.

Some local businesses have raised concerns about the festival's footprint. In 2023, a business owner near the grounds complained that the town closed businesses near festival exits after headlining sets to prevent crowding, and in 2026 The Baltimore Banner reported that some bars and restaurants must close early because of the festival's security measures, while businesses outside the perimeter reported little benefit.

== Lineups ==
Lineups are listed by day as announced or performed; headliners are listed first.

=== 2022 (cancelled) ===
The inaugural festival was scheduled for September 30 – October 2, 2022, but was cancelled on September 29 because of the remnants of Hurricane Ian.

Friday, September 30

- Dave Matthews & Tim Reynolds
- Dirty Heads
- O.A.R.
- Grouplove
- Skip Marley
- Noah Kahan
- Toad the Wet Sprocket
- Peach Pit
- Johnnyswim
- The New Respects
- Mihali
- Virginia Coalition

Saturday, October 1

- The Lumineers
- Cage the Elephant
- Logic
- Young the Giant
- Jimmy Eat World
- Allen Stone
- Larkin Poe
- Wilderado
- Pup Punk

Sunday, October 2

- Alanis Morissette
- Cyndi Lauper
- Sublime with Rome
- St. Paul and the Broken Bones
- Tai Verdes
- Lawrence
- Big Head Todd and the Monsters
- The Samples
- O.A.R. and Friends

=== 2023 ===
The 2023 festival was held September 29 – October 1, 2023.

Friday, September 29

- Jack Johnson
- Alanis Morissette
- Slightly Stoopid
- Third Eye Blind
- Michael Franti & Spearhead
- O.A.R.
- Declan McKenna
- Peach Pit
- Paolo Nutini
- Toad the Wet Sprocket
- Devon Gilfillian
- Michigander
- Calder Allen

Saturday, September 30

- John Mayer
- Incubus
- Noah Kahan
- Sheryl Crow
- Dispatch
- Jimmy Eat World
- Ben Harper & the Innocent Criminals
- Matt and Kim
- Mike Campbell & the Dirty Knobs
- Gin Blossoms
- White Reaper
- The New Respects
- Virginia Coalition
- Pup Punk

Sunday, October 1

- The Lumineers
- Weezer
- Nathaniel Rateliff & the Night Sweats
- Dirty Heads
- Fitz and the Tantrums
- Grace Potter
- The Wallflowers
- The Driver Era
- G. Love & Special Sauce
- Robert Randolph Band
- ALO
- Joe P
- O.A.R. and Friends

=== 2024 ===
The 2024 festival was held September 27–29, 2024. A reunited Sublime lineup with original members Eric Wilson and Bud Gaugh and vocalist Jakob Nowell, son of the late Bradley Nowell, performed on Friday, and Blues Traveler performed their 1994 album Four in full for its 30th anniversary. Dave Matthews, who had been booked to perform with Tim Reynolds at the cancelled 2022 event, made his festival debut with Dave Matthews Band as Sunday's headliner. Wind and heavy rain from the remnants of Hurricane Helene affected Friday's program, delaying Blink-182's headlining set by nearly an hour.

Friday, September 27

- Blink-182
- Cage the Elephant
- Sublime
- 311
- O.A.R.
- The Revivalists
- The Darkness
- Sugar Ray
- Larkin Poe
- Tonic
- Phillip Phillips
- Winona Fighter
- Vincent Lima
- Stolen Gin

Saturday, September 28

- The Killers
- The Offspring
- The Beach Boys
- The All-American Rejects
- Rebelution
- Young the Giant
- Grouplove
- The Hives
- Switchfoot
- The Beaches
- Brett Dennen
- Trevor Hall
- The Samples
- Katelyn Tarver

Sunday, September 29

- Dave Matthews Band
- Counting Crows
- Mt. Joy
- Boyz II Men
- O.A.R. and Friends
- Barenaked Ladies
- Blues Traveler
- Pigeons Playing Ping Pong
- Guster
- Lisa Loeb
- Big Head Todd and the Monsters
- Jade Bird
- Stephen Kellogg

=== 2025 ===
The 2025 festival was held September 26–28, 2025. Fountains of Wayne performed one of their first shows since the 2020 death of co-founder Adam Schlesinger, with Eve 6's Max Collins on bass, and Jack's Mannequin and 4 Non Blondes appeared as part of reunions. Saturday's sets, including Vampire Weekend's, took place in rain.

Friday, September 26

- Green Day
- Lenny Kravitz
- The Black Crowes
- Nelly
- O.A.R.
- Cake
- Live
- The Fray
- Fountains of Wayne
- The 502s
- Spin Doctors
- Letters to Cleo
- Ballyhoo!
- BEL
- Izzy Escobar

Saturday, September 27

- Noah Kahan
- Vampire Weekend
- Good Charlotte
- Modest Mouse
- Jack's Mannequin
- Collective Soul
- En Vogue
- Franz Ferdinand
- Natasha Bedingfield
- DJ Jazzy Jeff
- Mat Kearney
- Wheatus
- Bumpin Uglies
- Rachel Ana Dobken
- O.A.R.

Sunday, September 28

- Fall Out Boy
- Weezer
- Train
- Devo
- Vance Joy
- Ziggy Marley
- 4 Non Blondes
- Michelle Branch
- Blind Melon
- Burning Spear
- Marcy Playground
- Eric Hutchinson
- O.A.R. and Friends

=== 2026 (cancelled) ===
The 2026 festival was scheduled for September 25–27, 2026, but was cancelled because of a nor'easter.

Friday, September 25

- Dave Matthews Band
- Hootie & the Blowfish
- Ludacris
- O.A.R.
- Liz Phair
- Yellowcard
- Shaggy
- Everlast
- Gavin DeGraw
- Better Than Ezra
- Sons of Legion
- KT Tunstall
- Shwayze
- King Stingray
- Linka Moja

Saturday, September 26

- Twenty One Pilots
- Gwen Stefani
- Goo Goo Dolls
- Third Eye Blind
- All Time Low
- 311
- Violent Femmes
- Dashboard Confessional
- Everclear
- Corinne Bailey Rae
- Dishwalla
- Goldford
- Cassandra Coleman

Sunday, September 27

- Mumford & Sons
- Matchbox Twenty
- My Morning Jacket
- Caamp
- The Head and the Heart
- Hanson
- Jet
- OK Go
- Susanna Hoffs
- Cory Wong
- Fastball
- Nat Myers
- O.A.R. and Friends

== Related festivals ==
Following the success of Oceans Calling, C3 Presents added further festivals at the same Ocean City Inlet site:

- Country Calling Festival – a country music festival held the weekend after Oceans Calling. The inaugural two-day event on October 4–5, 2024, was headlined by Eric Church, Tyler Childers, Jelly Roll and Lainey Wilson. It expanded to three days for October 3–5, 2025, with headliners Luke Combs, Carrie Underwood, Luke Bryan and Brooks & Dunn.
- Boardwalk Rock – a spring hard rock festival first held May 17–18, 2025, with headliners including Def Leppard, Mötley Crüe and Nickelback. Organizers announced it would not return in 2026.

== See also ==
- List of music festivals in the United States
- Sea.Hear.Now Festival
