= Shaky Beats Music Festival =

Electronic music focused festival in Atlanta, Georgia

- Status: Cancelled
- Genre: EDM; Hip hop; Indie rock
- Locations: Central Park, Atlanta, Georgia (2016–2019)
- Years active: 3
- Inaugurated: May 20, 2016; 10 years ago
- Most recent: May 10–11, 2019 (Atlanta)
- Website: Official website

The Shaky Beats Music Festival was an annual music festival that took place in Central Park in Atlanta, Georgia. The festival was inaugurated in 2016 and featured largely EDM acts such as Odesza, Major Lazer, Big Gigantic, Porter Robinson, and Carnage. On October 15, 2019, the organizers of the festival announced on their Facebook page that the festival will not be returning in 2020, and will be retired effective immediately. The festival's first iteration hosted a total of 33,000 people. The second Shaky Beats Music Festival ran from May 5–7, 2017 at Centennial Olympic Park and featured acts like The Chainsmokers, Kaskade, and GRiZ.

== History ==
The Shaky Beats Music Festival was founded by Tim Sweetwood as part of Shaky Festivals LLC in 2015. It is the sister festival of the Shaky Knees Music Festival. The lineup for the inaugural 2016 Shaky Beats Music Festival was announced in December 2015. It would essentially fill the void of former Georgia-based EDM festivals, TomorrowWorld and Counterpoint. The initial festival took place from May 20–22, 2016 and hosted around 33,000 attendees in Atlanta's Centennial Olympic Park. In July 2016, it was announced that the festival would be returning to Centennial Olympic Park from May 5–7, 2017. In January 2017, the lineup was announced for the upcoming Shaky Beats Music Festival and included acts like The Chainsmokers, Kaskade, and GRiZ.

== 2016 festival ==
The first Shaky Beats Music Festival was held from May 20–22, 2016 in Atlanta's Centennial Olympic Park. Stages and tents from the Shaky Knees Music Festival, which had occurred one week before, were used for the Shaky Beats Festival. Prominent headliners included Major Lazer, Odesza, Big Gigantic, Porter Robinson, Carnage, Nas, Chromeo, and others. A total of 33,000 guests attended the three-day festival.

2016 Dates and Schedule

May 20, 2016

	Peachtree Stage	Piedmont Stage	Ponce de Leon Stage
4:45 PM		Small Black	
5:00 PM	Jai Wolf	Small Black	
5:15 PM	Jai Wolf	Small Black	
5:30 PM	Jai Wolf		Joe Kay
5:45 PM	Jai Wolf	Classixx	Joe Kay
6:00 PM		Classixx	Joe Kay
6:15 PM		Classixx	
6:30 PM	Yeasayer		ESTA
6:45 PM	Yeasayer		ESTA
7:00 PM	Yeasayer	AlunaGeorge	ESTA
7:15 PM	Yeasayer	AlunaGeorge	
7:30 PM		AlunaGeorge	Sango
7:45 PM		AlunaGeorge	Sango
8:00 PM	Duke Dumont		Sango
8:15 PM	Duke Dumont		Sango
8:30 PM	Duke Dumont	Zhu	
8:45 PM	Duke Dumont	Zhu	
9:00 PM		Zhu	
9:15 PM		Zhu	
9:30 PM	Major Lazer		
10:00 PM	Major Lazer		
10:15 PM	Major Lazer		
10:30 PM	Major Lazer		
10:45 PM	Major Lazer		
11:00 PM	Major Lazer		

May 21, 2016

	Peachtree Stage	Piedmont Stage	Ponce de Leon Stage
2:45 PM	Watch the Duck		
3:00 PM	Watch the Duck		
3:15 PM	Watch the Duck		
3:30 PM			Sassy Black
3:45 PM		Pomo	Sassy Black
4:00 PM	Com Truise		Sassy Black
4:15 PM	Com Truise	!!!	
4:30 PM	Com Truise	!!!	Clerks
4:45 PM		!!!	Clerks
5:00 PM	STRFKR		Clerks
5:15 PM	STRFKR	Tory Lanez	Clerks
5:30 PM	STRFKR	Tory Lanez	Part of 1
5:45 PM	STRFKR	Tory Lanez	Part of 1
6:00 PM		Marshmello	Part of 1
6:15 PM		Marshmello	
6:30 PM	Yeasayer	Marshmello	The M Machine
6:45 PM	Yeasayer	Marshmello	The M Machine
7:00 PM	Yeasayer		The M Machine
7:15 PM	Yeasayer	MØ	
7:30 PM		MØ	Trippy Turtle
7:45 PM		MØ	Trippy Turtle
8:00 PM	Porter Robinson (Live)		Trippy Turtle
8:15 PM	Porter Robinson (Live)		Trippy Turtle
8:30 PM	Porter Robinson (Live)	Chromeo (Live)	
8:45 PM	Porter Robinson (Live)	Chromeo (Live)	
9:00 PM		Chromeo (Live)	
9:15 PM		Chromeo (Live)	
9:30 PM	Odesza		
10:00 PM	Odesza		
10:15 PM	Odesza		
10:30 PM	Odesza		
10:45 PM	Odesza		
11:00 PM	Odesza		

May 22, 2016

	Peachtree Stage	Piedmont Stage	Ponce de Leon Stage
2:15 PM	Sir the Baptist		Mike Floss
2:30 PM	Sir the Baptist	Equinox	Mike Floss
2:45 PM	Sir the Baptist	Equinox	
3:00 PM	Sir the Baptist	Equinox	J Proppa
3:15 PM	Floating Points (Live)		J Proppa
3:30 PM	Floating Points (Live)		J Proppa
3:45 PM	Floating Points (Live)	Nugz Bunny	
4:00 PM		Nugz Bunny	Organik
4:15 PM		Nugz Bunny	Organik
4:30 PM	Aer	Nugz Bunny	Organik
4:45 PM	Aer		
5:00 PM	Aer	NGHTMRE	Baels
5:15 PM		NGHTMRE	Baels
5:30 PM		NGHTMRE	Baels
5:45 PM	ASAP Ferg	NGHTMRE	
6:00 PM	ASAP Ferg		Treasure Fingers
6:15 PM	ASAP Ferg	Yellow Claw	Treasure Fingers
6:30 PM		Yellow Claw	Treasure Fingers
6:45 PM		Yellow Claw	
7:00 PM	Nas	Yellow Claw	HXV
7:15 PM	Nas		HXV
7:30 PM	Nas	Carnage (DJ)	HXV
7:45 PM	Nas	Carnage (DJ)	HXV
8:00 PM		Carnage (DJ)	HXV
8:15 PM		Carnage (DJ)	
8:30 PM	Big Gigantic		
8:45 PM	Big Gigantic		
9:00 PM	Big Gigantic		
9:15 PM	Big Gigantic		
9:30 PM	Big Gigantic		
10:00 PM	Big Gigantic		

== 2017 festival ==
In July 2016, it was announced that the festival would return to Centennial Olympic Park in Atlanta from May 5–7, 2017. Acts for the upcoming festival were announced in January 2017. The acts included the following:

- The Chainsmokers
- Kaskade
- GRiZ
- Flosstradamus
- Zeds Dead
- Galantis
- RL Grime
- Girl Talk
- Gramatik
- Bonobo (Live)
- Alison Wonderland
- Flatbush Zombies
- Getter)
- Little Dragon
- Claude VonStroke
- Snails
- Slander
- Slushii
- Lost Kings
- Ephwurd
- Party Favor
- Mija
- Pouya
- Rezz
- Haywyre
- Boombox Cartel
- Joyryde
- Vanic
- Mutemath (Live DJ Set)
- Ganja White Night
- Loudpvck
- Crywolf
- Grandtheft
- Ekali
- Bad Royale
- Said the Sky
- Mayhem
- Echos
- Young Bombs
- Kaiydo
- CID
- ARMNHMR
- Wingtip
- Modern Measure
- Mantis
- Illenium
