= Soft Focus =

In photography, soft focus is a lens flaw, in which the lens forms images that are blurred due to spherical aberration.

Soft Focus may also refer to:

- Soft Focus (Euroboys album), 2004
- Soft Focus (Hotel Fiction album), 2021
- Soft Focus (novel), a 2000 novel by Jayne Ann Krentz
- Soft Focus with Jena Friedman, a 2018 series of TV specials
