= Wilderado =

American indie folk band

- Origin: Tulsa, Oklahoma
- Genres: Urban folk, alternative rock
- Years active: 2015–present
- Label: Bright Antenna Records
- Members: Max Rainer (lead singer, guitarist), Tyler Wimpee (guitarist, vocals), Justin Kila (drums)
- Past members: Colton Dearing (bass), David Arthur Stimson (bass), Jack Malonis (multi-instrumentalist)
- Website: wilderado.co

Wilderado is an American indie folk band from Tulsa, Oklahoma, United States. The band was first signed to Iamsound Records, but is now signed to Bright Antenna Records.

== History ==
Wilderado's Max Rainer and Tyler Wimpee met through mutual friends in college and started writing songs together in their fifth year after most of their friends had left. They went on a 30-concert tour with Flipturn in 2022, and expanded the tour to include bands Toledo and Michigander.

In 2016, the band released its first EP, Misty Shrub. On July 22, 2016, the band released its second EP, Latigo, which amassed over 18 million streams on Spotify. On the back of Latigo, Wilderado spent the next year touring with acts such as Band of Horses, Rainbow Kitten Surprise, Lindsey Buckingham, and Judah & The Lion.

In 2018, Wilderado released its third EP, Favors, to critical and fan acclaim. In July 2019, Wilderado released the single Surefire. The song was inspired by the poem “A Gradual Canticle for Augustine” by Tabitha King. Surefire was named one of the "5 Songs You Need to Hear Right Now" by Sirius XM's Spectrum.

In 2020, the band released 3 singles, CFS, Revenant, and Take Some Time, remixed by RJD2, Emancipator, Kyle McEvoy, & by Gus of Alt-J.

In 2021, the band released a new single, "Head Right." In October of the same year, the band released its debut album self-titled Wilderado.

In March, 2022, the band appeared on Jimmy Kimmel Live, for their television debut. On September 24, of that same year, they performed on CBS Saturday Morning, 'Saturday Sessions' for their AM TV Debut where they performed "Surefire," "Take Some Time," and "Outside My Head."

In 2024 they released their new LP, "Talker." They were also featured on the sound track for the 2024 film Twisters. The song "Wall of Death" featured Ken Pomeroy and James McAlister.

== Band name ==
The current name is an altered version of the name of a town in Texas called Wildorado, which the band came across while driving late at night. Originally the band was named "Bird Dog" until they learned that another band had been using the name prior to them, which prompted the change to the current name.

== Discography ==
=== Studio albums ===
Title	Release date	Tracklist	Runtimes
Wilderado	15 October 2021	1. "Stranger"; 2. "Astronaut"; 3. "Head Right"; 4. "Mr. Major"; 5. "The Worst of It"; 6. "Surefire"; 7. "The Window"; 8. "Outside My Head"; 9. "Take Some Time"; 10. "Help Me Down"	03:19; 03:33; 03:17; 04:33; 03:20; 04:01; 04:05; 03:48; 03:30; 03:40; Total: 37:06
Talker	20 September 2024	1. "Talker"; 2. "Bad Luck"; 3. "Simple"; 4. "Higher Than Most"; 5. "Coming to Town"; 6. "In Between"; 7. "Longstanding Misunderstanding"; 8. "Sometimes"; 9. "Tomorrow"; 10. "After All"; 11. "Waiting On You"; 12. "What Were You Waiting For?"	03:02; 03:23; 02:44; 03:20; 02:35; 02:36; 02:42; 03:00; 03:20; 03:17; 03:37; 02:37; Total: 36:13

=== EPs ===
Title	Release date	Tracklist	Runtimes
Misty Shrub	15 March 2017	1. "The Ocean and the Sea"; 2. "Dogs"; 3. "Red River"; 4. "The Desert Song"	03:52; 03:01; 04:42; 03:22; Total: 14:57
Singles	14 July 2017	1. "Bottoms"; 2. "Talking About Love to a Cigarette"; 3. "Under the Weather"; 4. "Now That I'm Older"; 5. "Petra Rae"; 6. "Millie"	03:03; 03:42; 03:19; 03:55; 03:31; 03:05; Total: 20:35
Latigo	28 July 2017	1. "Morning Light"; 2. "Already Loved"; 3. "Rubble to Rubble"; 4. "Wheat"	03:40; 03:26; 03:24; 03:46; Total: 14:16
Favors	25 May 2018	1. "You Don't Love Me"; 2. "Sorrow"; 3. "Siren"; 4. "Favors"	03:55; 04:12; 03:59; 03:48; Total: 15:54

=== Singles ===
Title	Release date	Alternative Airplay	Runtime
"CFS"	12 May 2020	—	02:06
"Revenant"	9 June 2020	—	03:43
"Head Right"	15 April 2021	29	3:17
"For Peyton"	20 September 2022	—	01:55
"Surefire"	27 September 2022	11	4:01
"Higher Than Most"	20 September 2024	23	3:19
