= San Gabriel Park =

Park in Georgetown, Texas, U.S.

Coordinates: 30.65073°N 97.66932°W

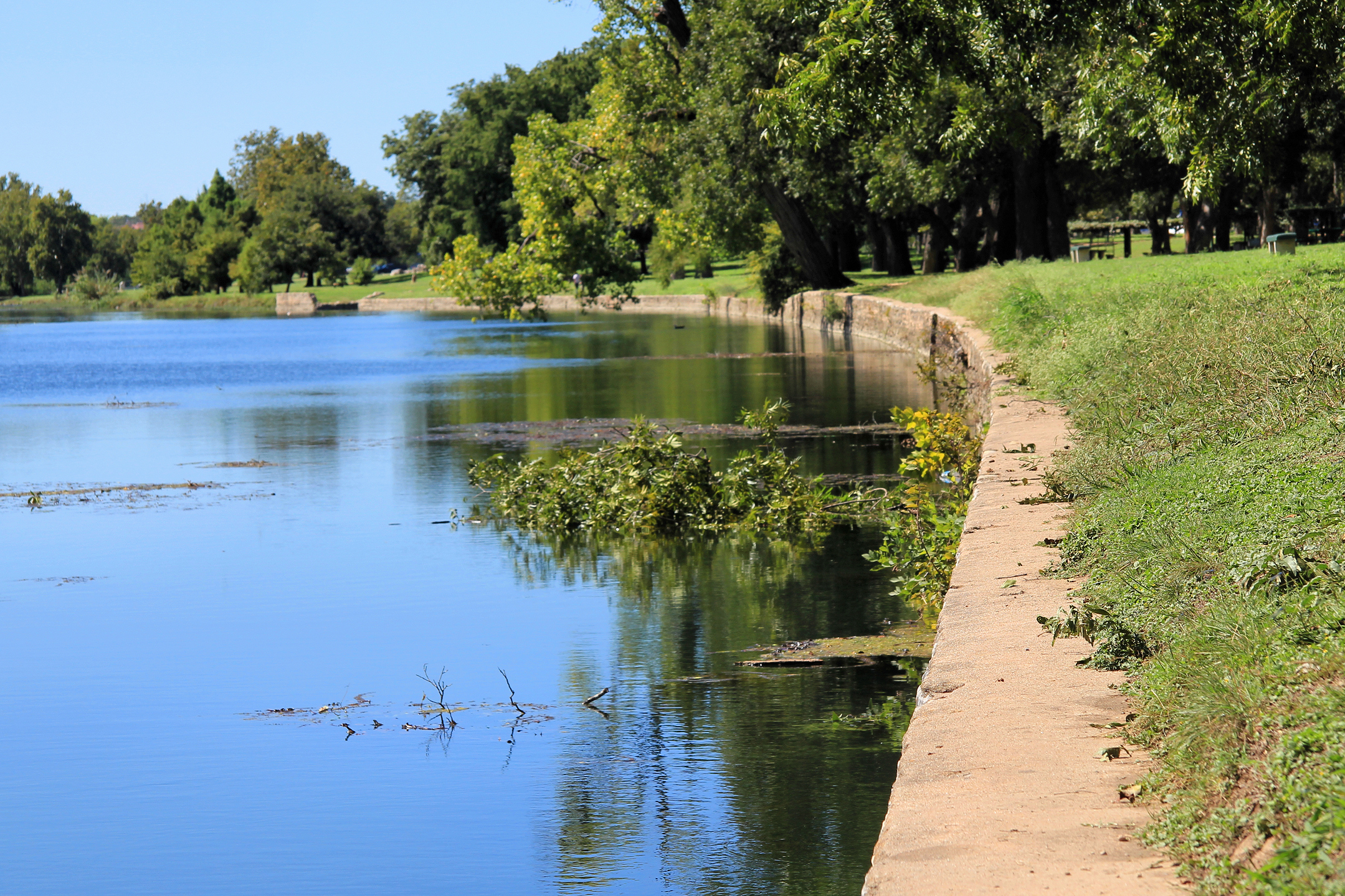
- Part of the park in 2014
- Interactive map of San Gabriel Park
- Location: Georgetown, Texas, U.S.

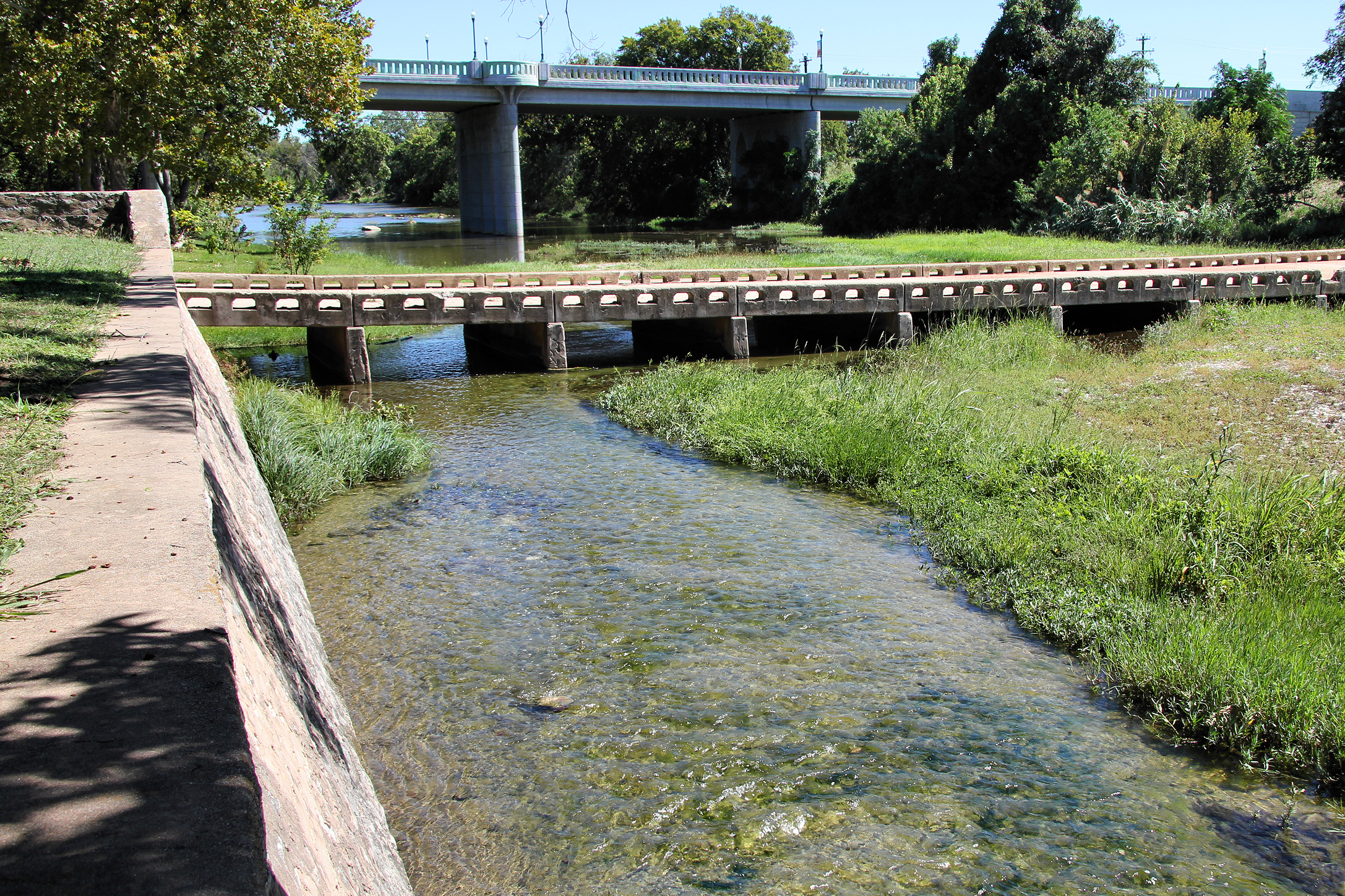
Low water crossing, 2014

San Gabriel Park is a park in Georgetown, Texas, United States. In 2012, the park was designated a Lone Star Legacy Park by the Texas Recreation & Parks Society.

The park hosts the country music festival Two Step Inn every year with it closing down the park often times to setup with the festival seeing big names from Zach Bryan to Lynyrd Skynyrd performing at it over the years.
