= Moody Center =

Multi-purpose arena in Austin, Texas, U.S.

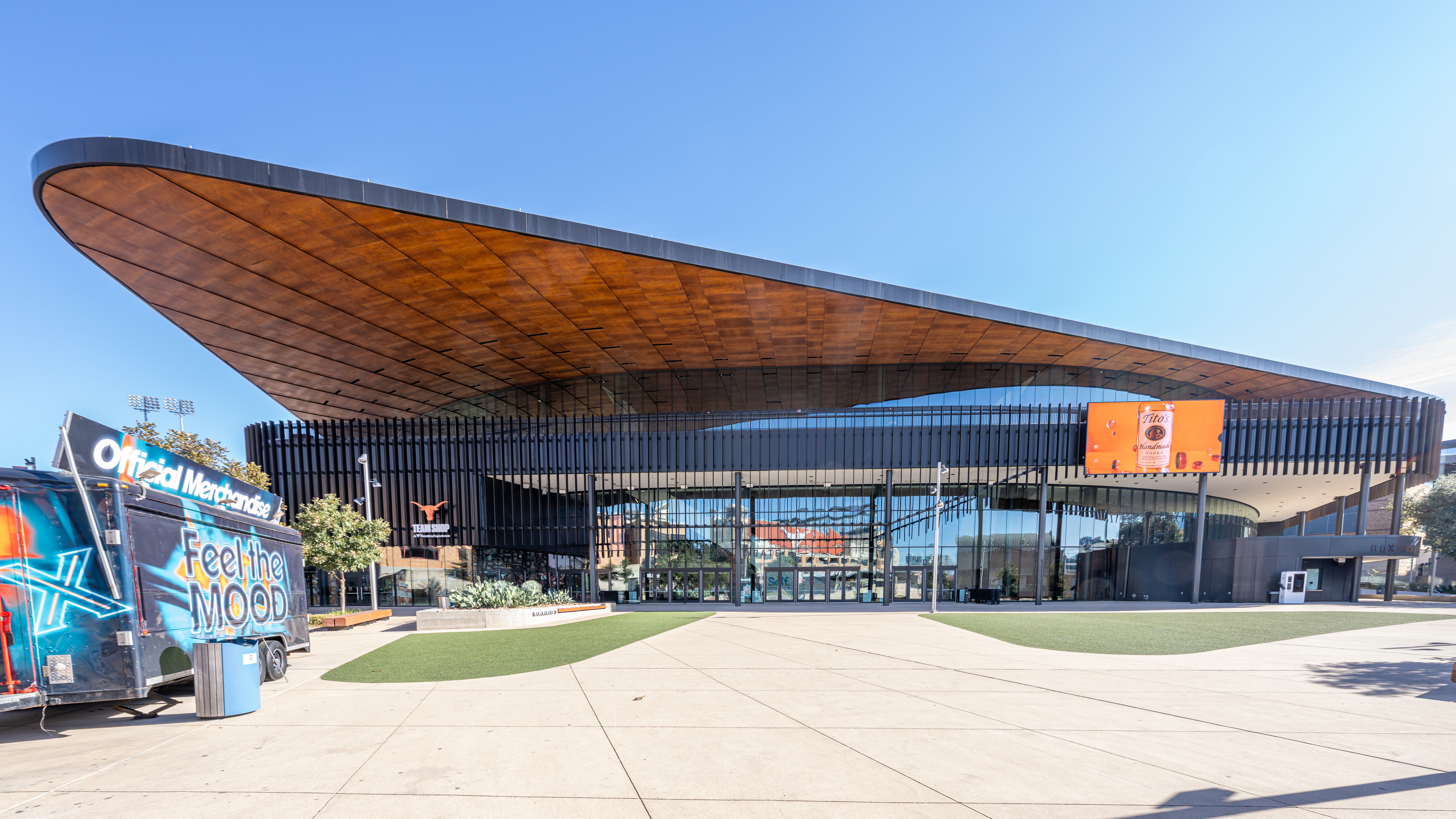
- External area of the arena
- Interactive map of Moody Center
- Full name: Moody Center
- Address: 2001 Robert Dedman Drive
- Location: Austin, Texas, U.S.
- Coordinates: 30°16′51.5″N 97°43′49.7″W
- Owner: University of Texas at Austin
- Operator: Oak View Group; University of Texas at Austin
- Capacity: 16,223 (total); 10,763 (UT basketball)
- Record attendance: 16,389

Construction
- Groundbreaking: December 3, 2019
- Opened: April 20, 2022
- Cost: $375 million (original) / $375 million (current estimate)
- Architect: Gensler
- Structural engineer: Walter P Moore

Tenants
- Texas Longhorns (men's and women's basketball) (2022–present); Austin Gamblers (PBR) (2022–present); San Antonio Spurs (NBA) (2023–present, selected home games)

Website
- moodycenteratx.com

Moody Center is a multi-purpose arena on the campus of the University of Texas at Austin (UT) in Austin, Texas. The arena, which replaced the Frank Erwin Center, stands on a former parking lot located immediately south of UT's soccer/track and field venue, Mike A. Myers Stadium. The arena seating capacity totals over 15,000 seats.

== History ==
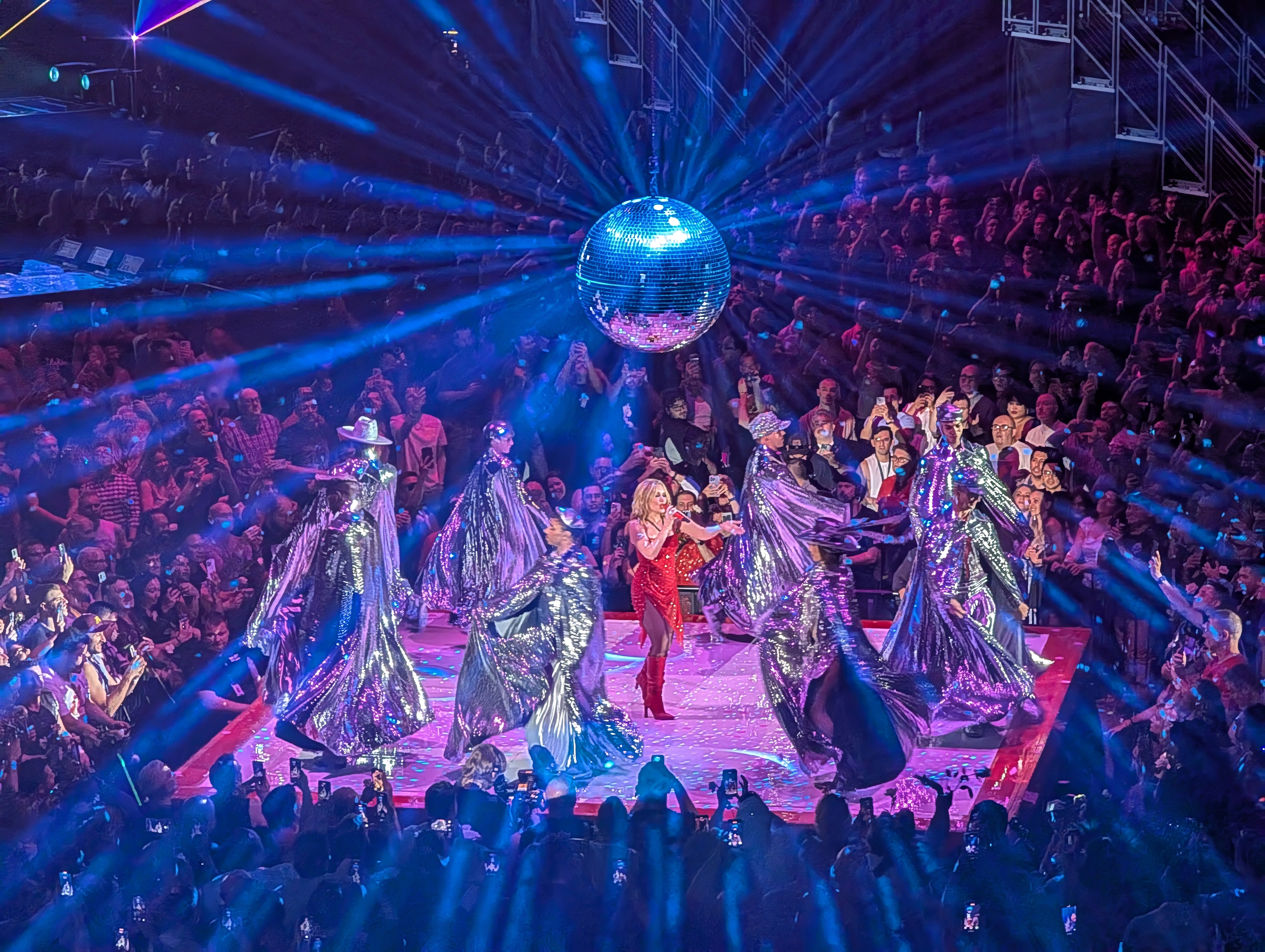
Kylie Minogue performing at the arena in 2025, during her Tension Tour

In 2018, it was announced that Oak View Group and UT agreed to form a public-private partnership, to build a new $375 million arena. The arena was intended to replace the Frank Erwin Center as the home for the Texas Longhorns basketball programs, and will also function as an events center for the city of Austin. The new arena is named the Moody Center following the Moody Foundation's grant of $130 million to the university. Oak View Group funded the construction, and manages the building in exchange for the right to keep most of the income from non-UT events, such as concerts and shows, for at least the first 35 years after opening. UT, however, owns the land under the arena and will be the owner of the building. Under the terms of the agreement, the university will have exclusive control of the arena for 60 days each year to hold men's and women's basketball games, graduations, and other events. Oak View Group, along with partners Live Nation and C3 Presents, will have the right to hold events on the other days.

The groundbreaking ceremony took place just south of Mike A. Myers Soccer Stadium on December 3, 2019. The arena held a ribbon-cutting ceremony on April 19, 2022 and opened to the public on April 20 with a two-night concert featuring John Mayer.

On July 9, 2025, a federal grand jury indicted the co-founder and CEO of Oak View Group, which manages the Moody Center and only the Moody Center, for conspiracy to rig the bidding process.

== Notable live events ==
George Strait and Willie Nelson had two shows on April 29–30, 2022. Dave Matthews Band performed the opening night of their 2022 Summer Tour on May 11.

The arena held its first UFC event on June 18, 2022, hosting UFC on ESPN: Kattar vs. Emmett. The UFC returned to the arena for UFC on ESPN: Dariush vs. Tsarukyan on December 2, 2023.

Harry Styles performed a six-show residency at the arena in September and October 2022, the most shows ever by a single artist, as part of his Love On Tour.

The arena hosted the MF & DAZN: X Series 003 event for Deen the Great vs. Walid Sharks on November 19, 2022.

The Texas Longhorns men's basketball team held their home opener November 7, 2022 at the Moody Center against the UTEP Miners. The Longhorns marked their first home victory at the arena outscoring UTEP 72–57 with an attendance of 11,313 spectators.

== Non-University of Texas at Austin tenants ==
Since 2022, the Moody Center has been the home venue of the Professional Bull Riders (PBR)'s Austin Gamblers during the PBR Team Series season held every summer through autumn.

In an attempt to expand their market reach into Austin, the San Antonio Spurs played two home games at the Moody Center on April 6 and 8, 2023, against the Portland Trail Blazers and Minnesota Timberwolves, respectively, marking the first NBA regular season games to be played in Austin. The first game brought in a sell-out crowd of 16,023. The Spurs had hosted more games at the Moody Center such as those against the Denver Nuggets and the Brooklyn Nets on March 15 and 17, 2024, respectively, Phoenix Suns and the Detroit Pistons on February 20 and 21, 2025, respectively, the Suns and the Sacramento Kings on February 19 and 21, 2026, respectively, and the Houston Rockets on October 23, 2026. They will also host the Memphis Grizzlies and the Nuggets on February 26 and 28, 2027, respectively.

The Moody Center hosted the Playoff Stage of the BLAST.tv Austin Major, a Counter-Strike 2 Major, in June 2025. The Major is the biggest event in Counter-Strike esports, with teams from all over the world qualifying.
