= Central Park (Atlanta) =

Park in Atlanta, Georgia, United States

Coordinates: 33.768733°N 84.376218°W

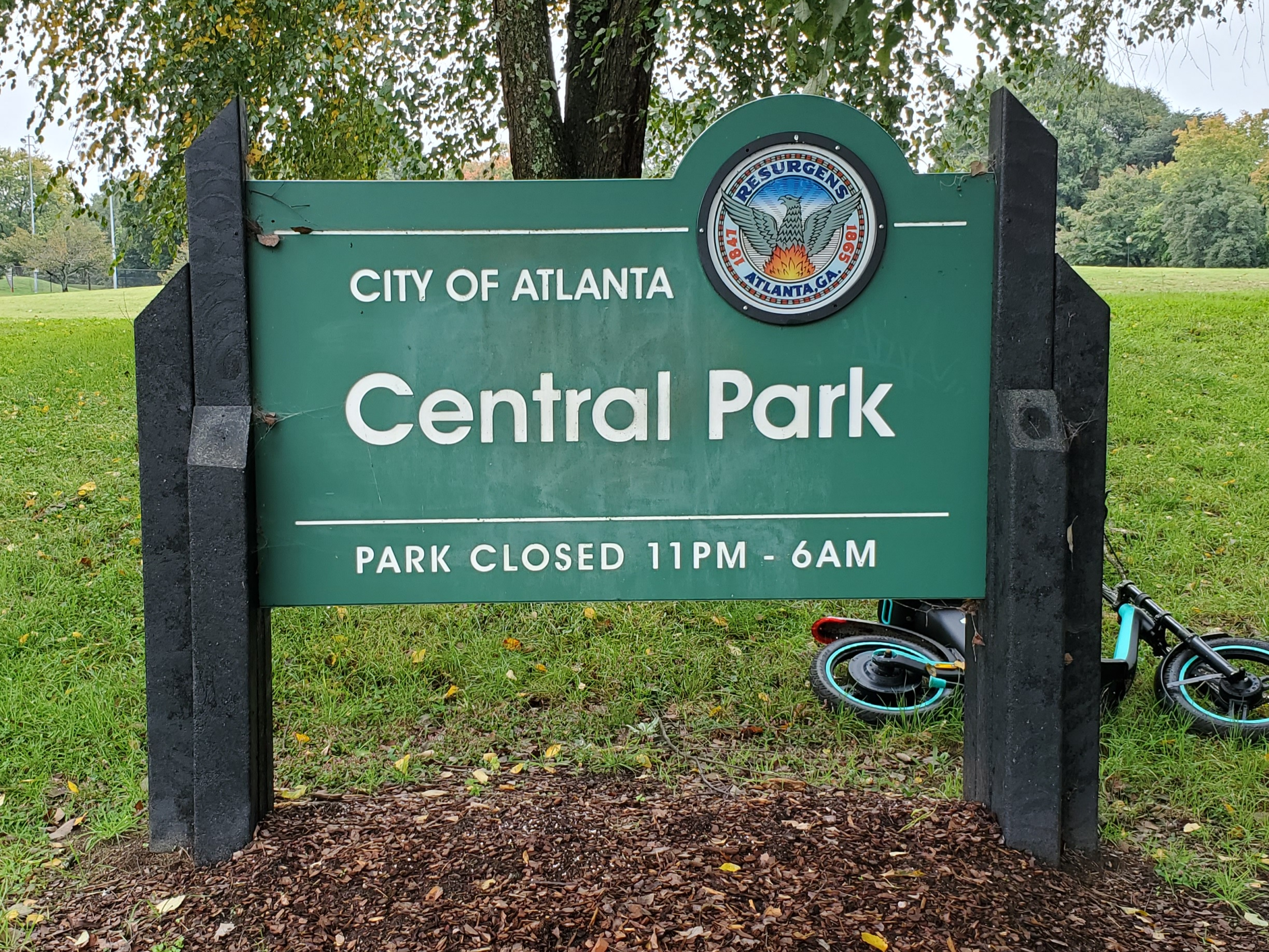
Central Park

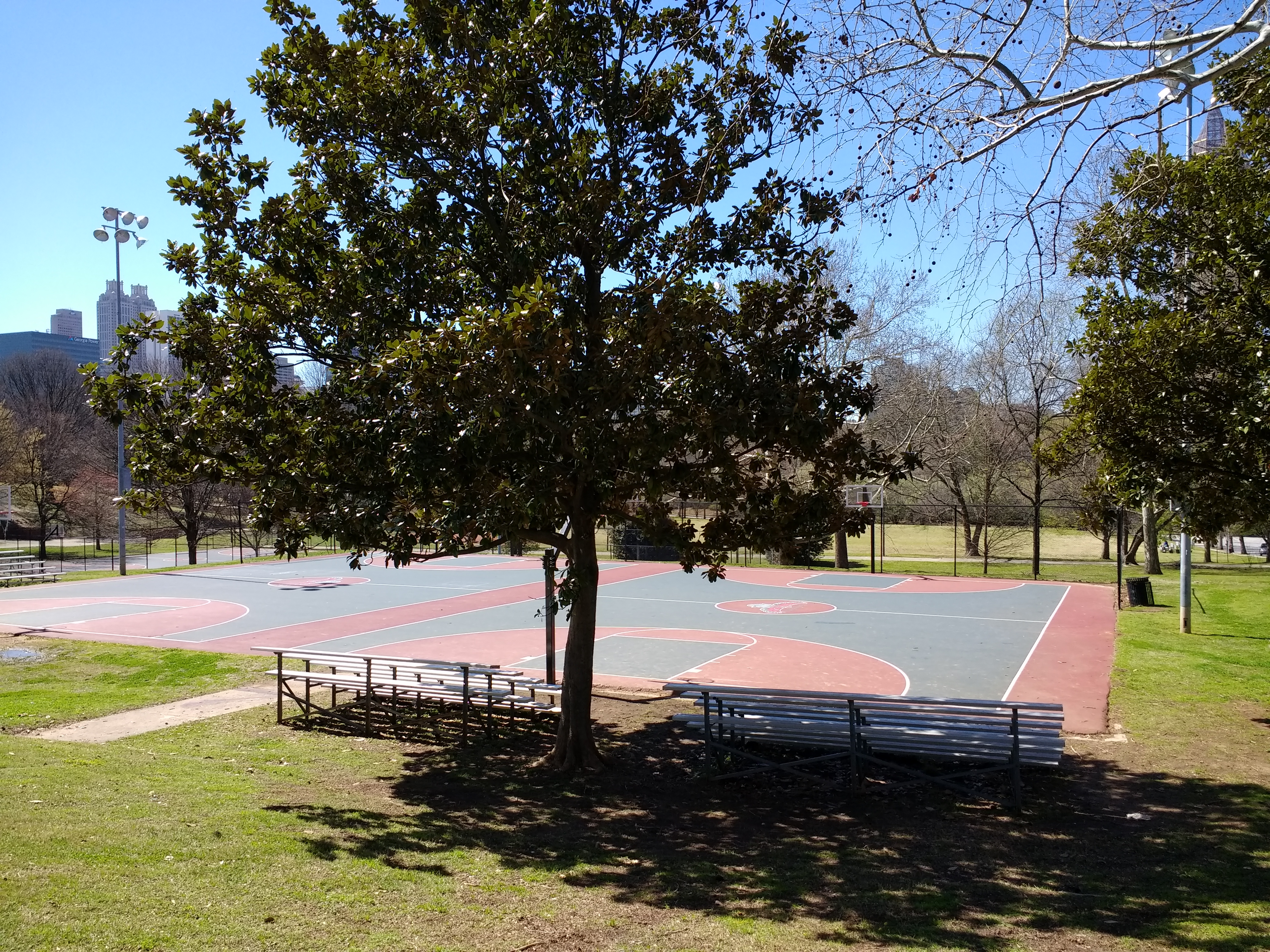
Basketball courts in Central Park

Central Park is a 17.37 acre park in the Fourth Ward West neighborhood of the Old Fourth Ward in Atlanta, Georgia. It was known as Bedford-Pine Park prior to 1999. The open space was created as a result of City of Atlanta Urban Renewal in the 1960s.

The Atlanta community comes to this park for casual use and coordinated events such as free movie nights that occur on certain days in the spring time and weekly during the summer season. Food festivals and work out classes are also hosted at Central Park.

In addition to the Music Midtown festivals being held in Central Park in the early 2000s, Central Park also hosted the two very widely known music festivals, Shaky Knees as well as Shaky Beats in May. These music festivals lasted for 3–4 days and were a huge attraction and activity for both residents and tourists.

This park is a sports oriented park with basketball courts, tennis courts, multi-purpose fields (soccer, football, kickball, softball) and a small playground for children. Plus, it has an indoor recreation center with a basketball court, small weight room and meeting rooms. In August 2013, a visioning process (master plan) for the park was started and involves the Fourth Ward West neighborhood association, Friends of Central and Renaissance Parks, Park Pride and the City of Atlanta Parks and Recreation Department.

As of 2023, the park is open for visitors Tuesday through Saturday and includes a facilities like the recreation center, outdoor courts and fields, a playground, and open greenspace. This plan may include sand volleyball courts, outdoor fitness equipment, walking/fitness path, new basketball courts, splash pad for children and a regulation size baseball field. All of this to be handled in phases as funding is made available.
