= Two Step Inn =

Country music festival in Texas, US

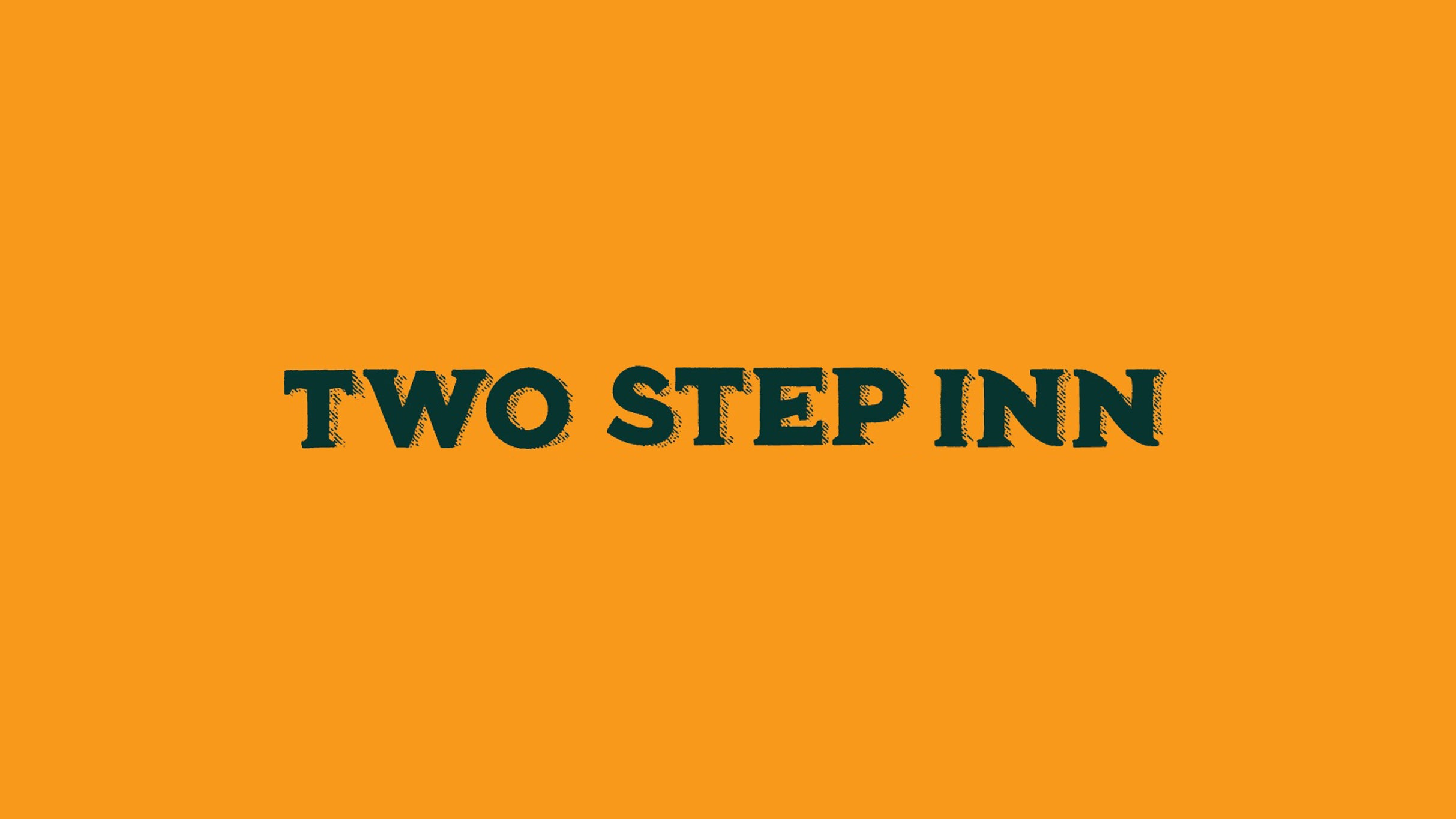
- Genre: Country/Pop
- Frequency: Annually
- Venue: San Gabriel Park
- Location: Georgetown, Texas
- Country: United States
- Years active: 2023–present
- Organiser: C3 Presents (a subsidiary of Live Nation Entertainment)
- Website: https://www.twostepinn.com

Two Step Inn is an annual country music festival held in San Gabriel Park in Georgetown, Texas, a suburb of Austin, Texas. Established in 2023, the festival is produced by C3 Presents, which is part of Live Nation Entertainment. While the focus is country music, the lineup often includes artists from pop, rock, hip hop, and Americana. The event is typically scheduled for April and has at times adjusted performance schedules due to inclement weather. Revenues and partnerships are cited by local officials as contributing to the City of Georgetown’s Parks and Recreation Department.

== Festival stages ==
The festival has featured multiple stages, including Pony Up, Showdeo, and Big River, with additional stages occasionally added due to sponsorship or production needs.

== Past events ==
=== 2023 — April 15–16 ===
The inaugural Two Step Inn attracted more than 30,000 attendees to San Gabriel Park. Headliners included Zach Bryan and Tyler Childers, with performances by Diplo, Wynonna Judd, Blanco Brown, and T-Pain, among others.

=== 2024 — April 20–21 ===
The second year experienced weather-related schedule adjustments and a handful of artist cancellations. Headliners included Cody Johnson, Turnpike Troubadours, and Hank Williams Jr., with performances by Ludacris, Wyatt Flores, Ryan Bingham, and Charley Crockett.

=== 2025 — April 5–6 ===
Attendance grew to an estimated 70,000 across two days. While organizers faced congestion and restroom-capacity challenges, the event proceeded as scheduled. Headliners included Miranda Lambert, Lynyrd Skynyrd, Alan Jackson, and Sturgill Simpson; notable sets included Nelly, Treaty Oak Revival, and Eli Young Band.

=== 2026 — April 18–19 ===
The 2026 edition is scheduled for April 18–19 at San Gabriel Park. Brooks & Dunn are slated to headline Saturday, with Chris Stapleton closing Sunday; other announced performers include Tedeschi Trucks Band, Goo Goo Dolls, The Red Clay Strays, Randy Rogers Band, Clay Walker, Wade Bowen, Wyatt Flores, Muscadine Bloodline, Shenandoah, Randy Travis: More Life, and BigXthaPlug.
