= *repeat repeat =

Band

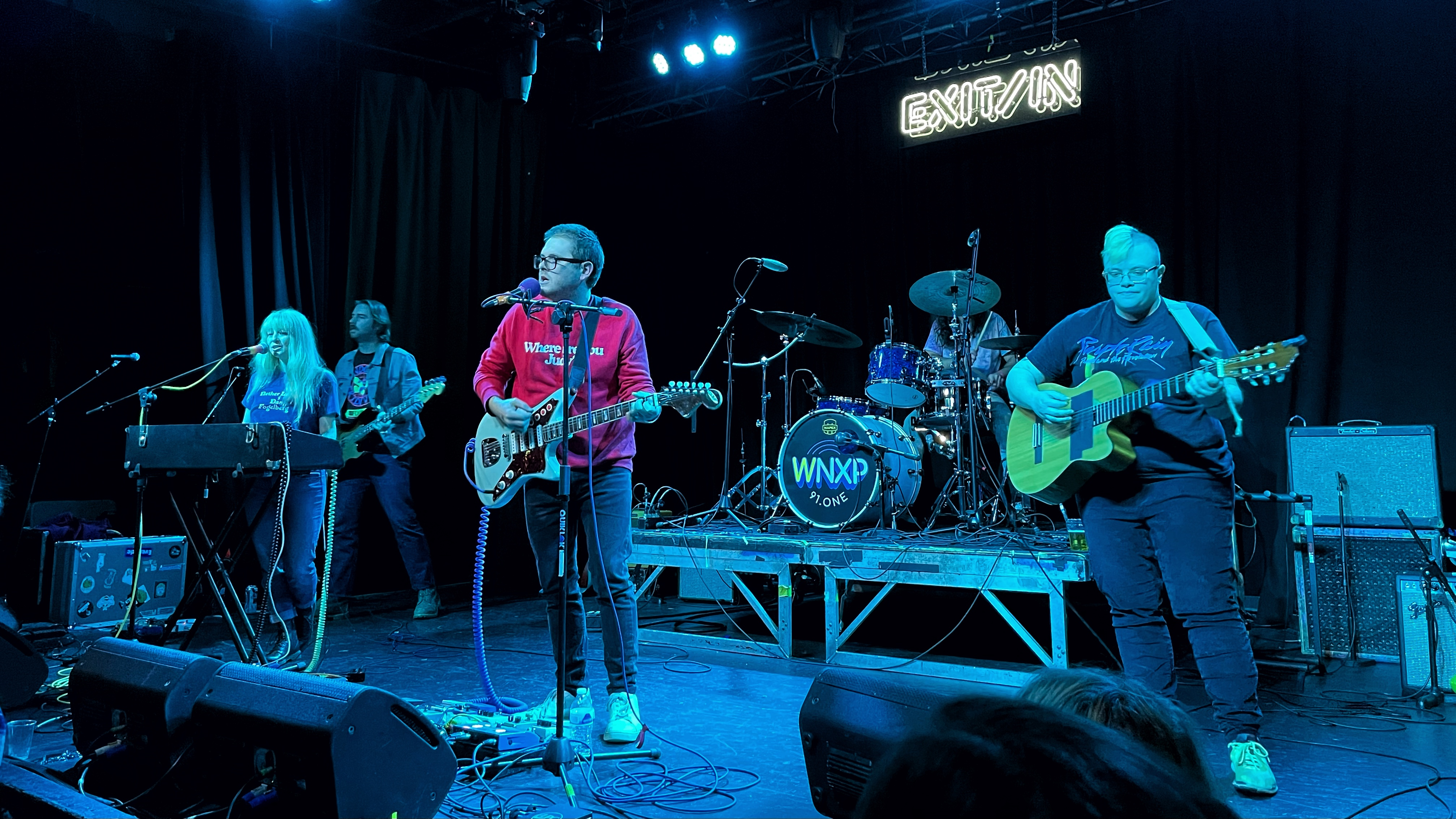
*repeat repeat

*repeat repeat is an indie rock band based in East Nashville, Tennessee that was founded in 2013 by Jared Corder and Kristyn Corder.

The band celebrated the release of its initial album, Bad Latitude, by performing their first hometown show at The Mercy Lounge in Nashville, opening for surf rock pioneer Dick Dale.

The band was included in AP.net's top Surf Rock Bands of 2019 and was featured on NPR Radio with a live session.

== Members ==
Members of *repeat repeat are the founding members Jared Corder (Vocals/Guitar) and Kristyn Corder (Vocals/Bass/Keyboards), with a live band of Neal Klein (Guitar/Bass), Dave Dreas (Guitar/Bass), Xander Naddra (Guitar), and Andrew Kahl (Drums/Percussion).

== Bad Latitude (2014) ==
Bad Latitude was the first album released by *repeat repeat. It was produced by Gregory Lattimer and recorded in a basement in Nashville in four days.

== Floral Canyon (2017) ==
*repeat repeat's Floral Canyon was produced by Gregory Lattimer and released by Dangerbird Records. Their second single, "Girlfriend", which was a song Jared wrote for Kristyn in hopes of starting a romantic relationship, made Soundcheck: 21 Best Music Releases Of The Week for Nylon and 5 Songs You Need to Listen To This Week by Time and was featured by Alternative Press. From there, they played at the Bonnaroo Music Festival in 2018, where they were noted as Most Enthusiastic Rockers by Rolling Stone.

== Glazed (2019) ==
Their album release Glazed via Dangerbird Records was produced by Patrick Carney from The Black Keys and recorded at Audio Eagle Records. The single "Hi, I'm Waiting" with music video premiered via Billboard and made the Top 10 Modern Bands Keeping Surf Rock Alive and Well in 2019 by Alternative Press (AP). It was also featured in Guitar World.

== Everyone Stop (2022) ==
Their fourth LP was released on November 25, 2022. It is a collection of 27 songs, 22 of which had been released as singles in the two years prior. It was recorded and produced at the band's own studio, Polychrome Ranch, located near Nashville. It was released in 2 formats: as a traditional album, and an "Experiential Version", one single track containing all 27 songs meant to be "listened to all the way through in one shot

== Kokomo Dirtbag (2024) ==
- repeat repeat's fifth LP was again recorded at the band's own studio, Polychrome Ranch, self produced with assistant engineer Kristofer Jedd during December of 2023. The lead single 'Assholes' was additionally released with a clean edit of the song using animal sounds as opposed to beeps believed to be inspired by the ranch they call home.

== Touring ==
The band has toured and opened for the Black Keys and Modest Mouse on their "Let's Rock" tour in 2019, where they performed at Bridgestone Arena in their hometown. They have also played other events such as Forecastle, Shaky Knees, Bonnaroo, Firefly, and Nashville's Live on the Green.

== Discography ==
=== LPs ===
- 2014 – Bad Latitude Produced by Gregory Lattimer
- 2017 – Floral Canyon Produced by Gregory Lattimer
- 2019 – Glazed Produced by Patrick Carney of The Black Keys, featuring Michelle Branch on 'Woke With You'
- 2022 – Everyone Stop with an alternate experimental version
- 2024 – Kokomo Dirtbag

=== EPs ===
- 2021 – Live From Home
- 2021 – Song(s) For A Nice Drive

== Videography ==
- 12345678 (2013)
- Chemical Reaction (2014)
- Plugged In (2016)
- Girlfriend (2017)
- Hi, I'm Waiting (2019)
- For Leaving You / Go Now (2021)
- Dearly Departed (2021)
- Teeth Grinder (2021)
- Trippin' (I Know I Will) (2021)
- Song for a Nice Drive (2021)
- Arrangements (2022)
- Soft (2022)
