= Billy Kenny (artist) =

British DJ

- Origin: Leeds, United Kingdom
- Genres: Tech House; House music
- Instruments: Synthesizers; Vocals
- Years active: 2000–present
- Labels: Relief; Dirtybird Records; This Ain't Bristol
- Website: billykennymusic.com

Billy Stephen Kenny is a British DJ. Billy is based between Leeds (UK), California (US), and Hanover (Germany), where his co-owned record label, This Ain’t Bristol, is headquartered.

On April 2, 2018, Kenny was arrested for possessing liquid marijuana at Los Angeles International Airport; his U.S. visa was revoked and all his American tour dates were cancelled.

In July 2020, Kenny was accused of sexual misconduct and removed from the virtual Shambhala lineup he was slated to play on without prior notice. He responded by saying he was "disappointed" in the decision made by festival coordinators, but acknowledged bad behavior in his past. After these allegations surfaced, another female DJ accused Kenny of rape, and he promptly deleted his social media accounts. Much of his music was removed from online catalogues after backlash from both fans and peers within the EDM community.

== Discography ==
=== Compilations ===
- Billy Kenny Selections (This Ain't Bristol,2016)
- This Ain't Bristol - Celebrations (This Ain't Bristol,2017)
- Dirtybird Campout West Coast Compilation (Dirtybird Records,2017)
- Dirtybird BBQ Secret Sauce (Dirtybird Records,2016)

=== EPs ===
- The Grind EP (Sola 2018)
- Seahorses EP (This Ain't Bristol,2018)
- Billy Kenny And Friends 2 (This Ain't Bristol,2018)
- The Hood EP (Relief,2017)
- Billy Kenny and Friends EP (This Ain't Bristol,2017)
- One Night Stand EP (This Ain't Bristol,2016)
- The Horn Thing EP (Food Music, 2016)

=== Singles ===
- Set Me Free (Ultra/Sony 2018)
