= Hotel Fiction =

American alternative indie rock band

- Origin: Athens, Georgia, U.S.
- Genres: Alternative rock, indie rock
- Years active: 2019–present
- Members: Jade Ireland; Jessica Thompson; Aaron Daugherty; Aidan Hill; Gideon Johnston

Hotel Fiction are an alternative rock band based in Athens, Georgia. The band was formed in 2019 by Jade Ireland and Jessica Thompson. Currently, the band consists of five members: Ireland (vocals, keys), Thompson (vocals, lead guitar), Aaron Daugherty (lead guitar, synth), Aidan Hill (bass), and Gideon Johnston (drums).

== History ==
=== Formation and first album ===
Jade Ireland and Jessica Thompson began writing songs together in 2018 after meeting at the University of Georgia in Athens, Georgia. In 2019, the duo founded the band and released their first single, "Astronaut Kids", in August of that same year. Following the release of "Astronaut Kids", the band quickly gained popularity and notoriety in the Athens music scene, playing numerous shows and releasing new singles. In August 2021, the duo independently released their debut LP, titled Soft Focus. The band's first EP, Enjoy Your Stay, was released in October 2022.

=== Expansion and second album ===
In 2022, the band expanded to five members with the addition of Aaron Daugherty, Aidan Hill, and Gideon Johnston to the band's lineup. In July 2024, the band released their second LP, Staring at the Sun. The band also participated in a national tour, headlining 30 shows from September to November 2024.

== Discography ==
=== Albums ===
- Soft Focus, 2021
- Staring at the Sun, 2024

=== EPs ===
- Enjoy Your Stay, 2022
