= C3 Presents =

Concert promotion, event production and artist management company

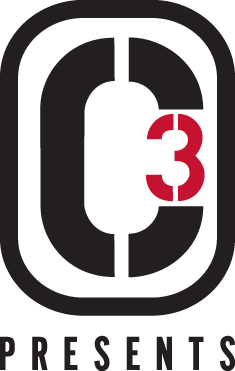
- Type: Subsidiary
- Industry: Concert promotion, event production and artist management
- Founded: 2007; 19 years ago
- Founder: Charles Attal, Charlie Jones and Charlie Walker
- Headquarters: Austin, Texas, United States
- Parent: Live Nation Entertainment (2014-Present)
- Website: c3presents.com

C3 Presents is an American producer and promoter of major, multi-day, music festivals and events held in multiple countries. The company is based in Austin, Texas where they book, own, and operate multiple music venues.

C3 Presents was founded in Austin in 2007 and has been owned by parent company Live Nation Entertainment since 2014.

== History ==
C3 was founded by Charles Attal, Charlie Jones and Charlie Walker in 2007(2) and headquartered in Austin, TX. Before founding C3, Attal and Jones worked at Capital Sports & Entertainment, which produced the Austin City Limits Music Festival and, in 2005, licensed and revived the Lollapalooza Festival as a permanent event in Chicago’s Grant Park. Walker joined them in 2007 after leaving Live Nation, and together the three established C3 Presents as a new company, distinct from Capital Sports & Entertainment, which then assumed production of both the Austin City Limits Music Festival and Lollapalooza.

In the fall of 2014, Live Nation began talks to purchase a 51% stake in the Austin company’s events production and promotions businesses. At the time, C3 was the largest independent concert promoter in the world. The deal was completed in December of that year.

In 2018, C3 Presents and parent company Live Nation entered into a partnership with the Oak View Group to develop a 15,000 seat arena on the campus of the University of Texas at Austin. The Moody Center opened in May 2022 and is the home of UT basketball as well as music and entertainment events booked by C3.

The company purchased the historic blues venue Stubb's in 2022

== Festivals & Events ==
C3 Presents produces annual festivals that include Lollapalooza (globally), Austin City Limits Music Festival, Bonnaroo Music & Arts Festival, Governors Ball, Two Step Inn, Innings Festival, Sea.Hear.Now, Shaky Knees Festival, Oceans Calling Festival, Railbird Festival and many more.

C3 also books and promotes over 1,000 shows nationwide in venues including Stubb's BBQ (sole promoter) and the Moody Amphitheater in Austin, Emo's (C3 owned and operated) and Historic Scoot Inn (C3 owned and operated). The company partnered with the Waterloo Greenway Conservancy to book shows in the Moody Amphitheater in Austin's Waterloo Park.

== Community Involvement ==
In 2023, C3 Presents became an official partner of the music business program at Huston–Tillotson University and provided scholarship funds as the program launched. The company provides financial support for the SIMS Foundation, a non-profit that provides mental health and addiction recovery services to the Austin music community and directs surplus food supplies from events to local organizations fighting hunger.

The company also contributes a portion of proceeds from the annual Austin City Limits Festival to the Austin Parks Foundation, a contribution that totaled $8.1 million in 2023.

In 2021, the company created the Lollapalooza Arts Education Fund, creating a $2.2 million fund to support arts education in Chicago Public Schools. Funds are to be distributed to schools between 2021 and 2026,

== Artist management ==
In addition to promotion and production, C3 Presents also has an artist management division operating in New York City, Los Angeles, Denver, and Austin. The company also maintains its own freestanding radio promotion, film/TV, digital, and creative staffs.
