= Peach Pit (band) =

Canadian indie pop band

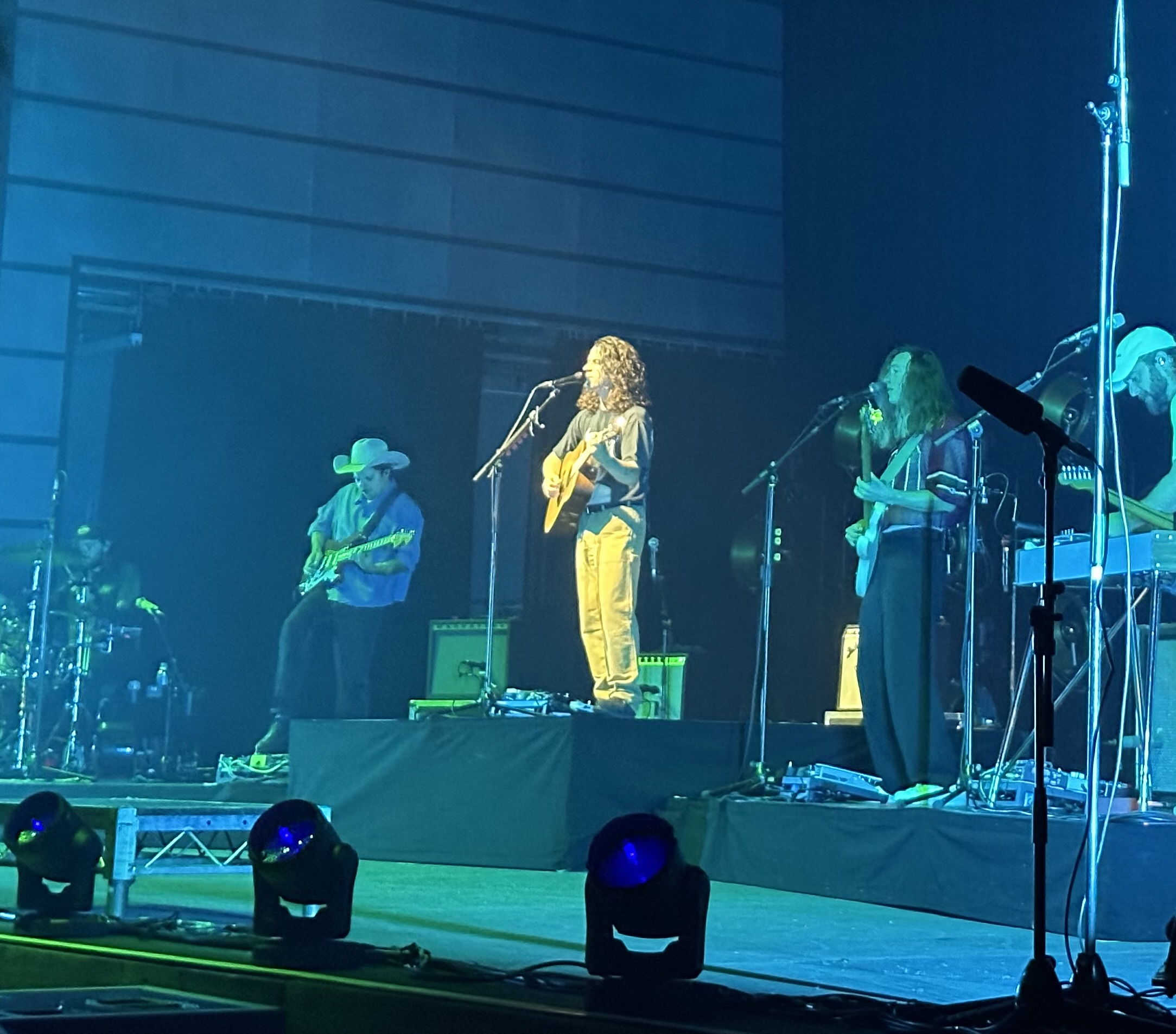
- Peach Pit in 2025

Background information
- Origin: Vancouver, British Columbia, Canada
- Genres: Indie pop; indie rock; surf rock; jangle pop
- Years active: 2016–present
- Labels: Columbia, Kingfisher Bluez
- Members: Neil Smith; Mikey Pascuzzi; Peter Wilton; Christopher Vanderkooy
- Website: www.peachpitmusic.com

Peach Pit is a Canadian indie pop band formed in Vancouver, British Columbia in 2016. The band consists of singer and rhythm guitarist Neil Smith, lead guitarist Christopher Vanderkooy, bassist Peter Wilton, and drummer Mikey Pascuzzi. They describe their own music as "chewed bubblegum pop", whereas critics have described their sound as sad pop and surf rock. Their music is characterized by a soft spoken vocal style and guitar-driven rock melodies. The band's music videos are produced by videographer Lester Lyons-Hookham.

== History ==
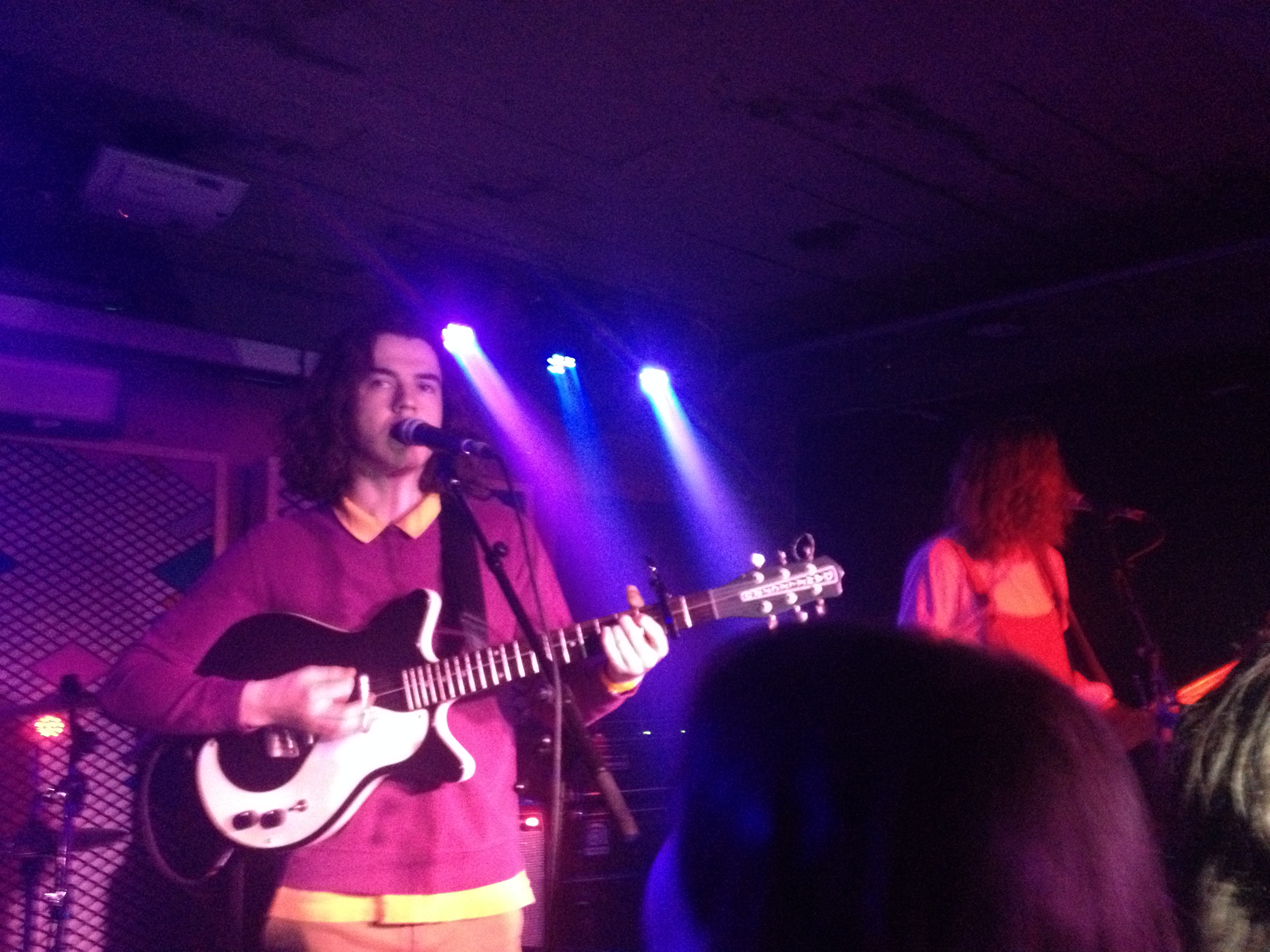
Peach Pit in 2018

The group formed when high school friends, Neil Smith and Chris Vanderkooy, decided to collaborate on a musical project in 2014. Peter Wilton and Mikey Pascuzzi joined them on bass and drums. In June 2016, the band released its debut EP, Sweet FA. They quickly began work on their follow up release and debut LP, Being So Normal. It was released in September 2017 on the Vancouver indie label Kingfisher Bluez.

Vocalist/rhythm guitarist Neil Smith was formerly part of the folk band Dogwood and Dahlia. Smith and bassist Peter Wilton formerly worked as Amazon delivery drivers, guitarist Christopher Vanderkooy worked at a local Vancouver brewery, and drummer Mikey Pascuzzi worked as a carpenter. Following the success of their debut album, Being So Normal, the band quit their jobs. Peach Pit embarked on several tours through North America, Europe, and Asia, from 2017 to 2018. During the Being So Normal album phase, the band sported the same clothes for every live performance after buying them for their first music video shoot. They have performed at renowned festivals such as SXSW and Osheaga, and have shared the stage with notable acts like Mac DeMarco and Dayglow.

Peach Pit performed at Bonnaroo, Shaky Knees Music Festival, CBC Music Festival, and Capitol Hill Block Party in 2019 and opened for Two Door Cinema Club in a tour of the U.S. and Canada in 2019. In April 2020, the band released their anticipated sophomore album, You and Your Friends. Their third studio album, From 2 to 3, was released on March 4, 2022. They have performed in Chicago, Illinois for Lollapalooza in August 2023. They performed at Day In Day Out in Seattle, Washington in July 2024. Their fourth studio album, Magpie, was released in 2024.

== Members ==
- Neil Smith – lead vocals, rhythm guitar
- Christopher Vanderkooy – lead guitar, lap steel, keyboards
- Peter Wilton – bass, backing vocals
- Mikey Pascuzzi – drums, percussion, harmonica

Current touring musicians

- Dougal McLean - rhythm guitar, keyboards, violin (2021–present)

== Awards and nominations ==
| Award | Year | Category | Nominee(s) | Result | Ref. |
|---|---|---|---|---|---|
| Juno Awards | 2026 | Group of the Year | | Nominated | |
| Juno Awards | 2025 | Alternative Album of the Year | "Magpie" | Nominated | |
| Juno Awards | 2021 | Breakthrough Group of the Year | | Nominated | |

== Discography ==
=== Albums ===
| Title | Album details |
|---|---|
| Being So Normal | Released: September 15, 2017; Label: Kingfisher Bluez; Format: Digital download, streaming, vinyl, CD |
| You and Your Friends | Released: April 3, 2020; Label: Columbia; Format: Digital download, streaming, vinyl |
| From 2 to 3 | Released: March 4, 2022; Label: Columbia; Format: Digital download, streaming, vinyl |
| Magpie | Released: October 25, 2024; Label: Columbia; Format: Digital download, streaming, vinyl |

=== EPs ===
- Sweet FA (2016)

=== Live albums ===
- Peach Pit on Audiotree Live (2017)
- Live in 25 (2026)

=== Singles ===
- "Alrighty Aphrodite" (September 12, 2017) appeared on Billboard Canada Rock chart for 15 weeks, peaking at #37
- "Did I Make You Cry on Christmas Day? (Well, You Deserved It!)" (December 14, 2017)
- "Feelin' Low (F*ckboy Blues)" (November 1, 2019)
- "Shampoo Bottles" (January 24, 2020)
- "Black Licorice" (March 5, 2020)
- "Up Granville" (October 1, 2021)
- "Look Out!" (November 12, 2021)
- "Vickie" (January 21, 2022)
- "Magpie" (August 23, 2024) appeared on Adult Alternative Airplay chart for 11 weeks, peaking at #23
- "Did You Love Somebody" (September 20, 2024)
- "Every Little Thing" (October 18, 2024)
