= Flipturn (band) =

American indie rock band

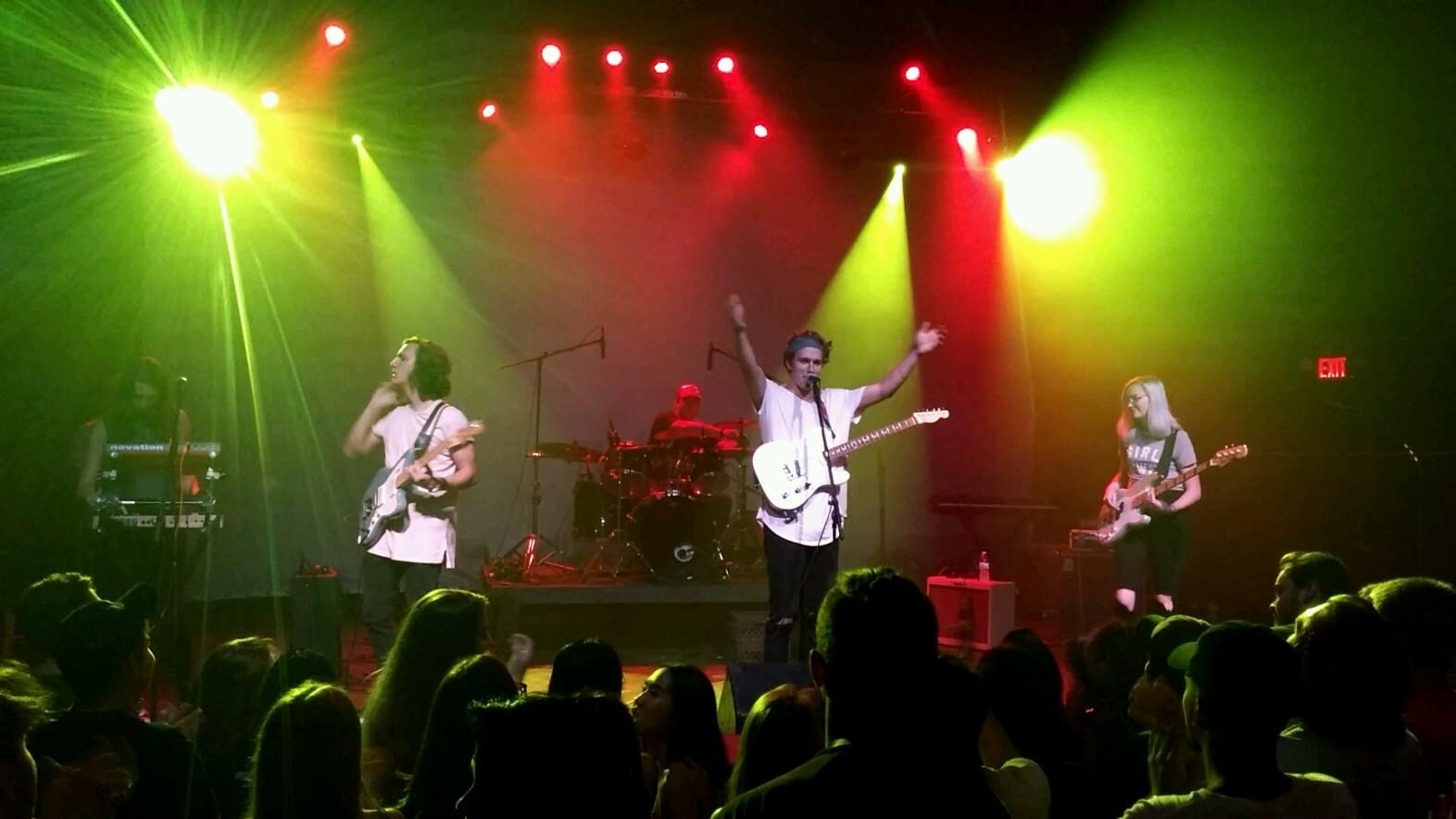

Background information
- Origin: Fernandina Beach, Florida, U.S.
- Genres: Indie rock
- Years active: 2015–present
- Label: Dualtone
- Members: Dillon Basse; Tristan Duncan; Madeline Jarman; Mitch Fountain; Devon VonBalson
- Past members: Taylor Allen; Adrian Walker
- Website: flipturn.band

Flipturn (stylized in all lowercase) is an American indie rock band from Fernandina Beach, Florida formed in 2015. The band consists of founding members Dillon Basse (vocals), Tristan Duncan (guitar), and Madeline Jarman (bass), who founded the band as high school seniors. After their college years at the University of Florida, they picked up guitarist and synthesizer player Mitch Fountain, and drummer Devon VonBalson.

Flipturn gained traction in 2018 with their EP Citrona and its single "August". The band signed to Dualtone Records in June 2022. They released their debut album Shadowglow in August 2022, which received positive reception. The album release was followed by a tour through the United States in late 2022 into 2023 and the festival lineups of Lollapalooza, Governor’s Ball, Bonnaroo, Shaky Knees, and SXSW. The band's second studio album, Burnout Days, was released in January 2025.

== History ==
Starting in March 2022, Flipturn released five singles – "Playground", double single "Halfway" / "Brooklyn Baby", "Whales", and "Space Cowboy" – leading up to their debut album Shadowglow's release in August.

In November 2023, the band announced its Something More Tour due to take place in Spring 2024, with support from fellow indie rock band Richy Mitch and the Coal Miners.

On September 26, 2024, the band released the single "Rodeo Clown" along with the announcement of their sophomore album Burnout Days, to be released on January 24, 2025. Following "Rodeo Clown", two more singles – "Juno" and "Sunlight" – were released in anticipation of Burnout Days.

== Band members ==
=== Current members ===
- Dillon Basse - lead vocals
- Tristan Duncan - guitars
- Madeline Jarman - bass guitar
- Mitch Fountain - guitars, synthesizers
- Devon VonBalson - drums, percussion

=== Former members ===
- Taylor Allen - keyboards
- Adrian Walker - drums, percussion

== Discography ==
=== Albums ===
Title	Details
Shadowglow	Released: August 19, 2022; Label: Dualtone Records; Formats: CD, LP, digital download, streaming; Track listing: 1. "The Fall"; 2. "Playground"; 3. "Whales"; 4. "Sad Disco"; 5. "Brooklyn Baby"; 6. "Halfway"; 7. "In Consideration"; 8. "Goddamn"; 9. "Hollow"; 10. "Burn"; 11. "Weepy Woman"; 12. "Take Care"; 13. "Space Cowboy"; 14. "Orbit"
Burnout Days	Released: January 24, 2025; Label: Dualtone Records; Formats: CD, LP, digital download, streaming; Track listing: 1. "Juno"; 2. "Rodeo Clown"; 3. "Inner Wave"; 4. "Sunlight"; 5. "Moon Rocks"; 6. "Right?"; 7. "Window"; 8. "Swim Between Trees"; 9. "Tides"; 10. "Reason to Pretend"; 11. "If It Is"; 12. "Burnout Days"

=== EPs ===
- Heavy Colors (2017)
- Citrona (2018)
- Something You Needed (2020)

=== Singles ===
Title	Year	Peak chart positions	Album
Title	Year	US AAA	Album
"Cartoon Head"	2016	—	
"Churches"	2018	—	Citrona
"August (Acoustic)"	2019	—	
"Eleanor"	2019	—	
"Darling"	2019	—	
"Playground"	2022	—	Shadowglow
"Halfway" / "Brooklyn Baby"	2022	—	Shadowglow
"Whales"	2022	—	Shadowglow
"Space Cowboy"	2022	—	Shadowglow
"Everybody Wants to Rule the World"	2023	—	Shadowglow (Deluxe)
"Rodeo Clown"	2024	17	Burnout Days
"Juno"	2024	—	Burnout Days
"Sunlight"	2024	—	Burnout Days
