= Soft Focus (Hotel Fiction album) =

2021 album by Hotel Fiction

Studio album by Hotel Fiction
- Released: August 27, 2021
- Genre: Alternative rock, indie rock
- Producer: Tommy Trautwein

Hotel Fiction chronology
Soft Focus (2021)	Enjoy Your Stay (2022)

Soft Focus is the first full-length album released by Hotel Fiction, released on August 27, 2021.

== Release and reception ==
Soft Focus was initially intended to be released on Halloween of 2020, but due to the COVID-19 pandemic, the album's release was delayed.

Atwood Magazine described the album as "beautifully sweet and breathtakingly intimate". A1234 illustrated the album's lyrics as relatable and heartfelt, while detailing the music as "dreamy". The Reflector praised the album for being "cohesive" and containing "catchy hooks, lively piano melodies, and dreamy guitar riffs".

== Track listing ==
No.	Title	Length
1.	"Astronaut Kids"	4:40
2.	"Think Twice"	4:19
3.	"Daydrifter"	2:49
4.	"Ghost Train"	4:42
5.	"Out of My Head"	4:54
6.	"Steady"	4:19
7.	"Golden Days"	2:53
8.	"Soft Focus"	4:51
9.	"17"	3:14
