= Michigander (band) =

American rock band

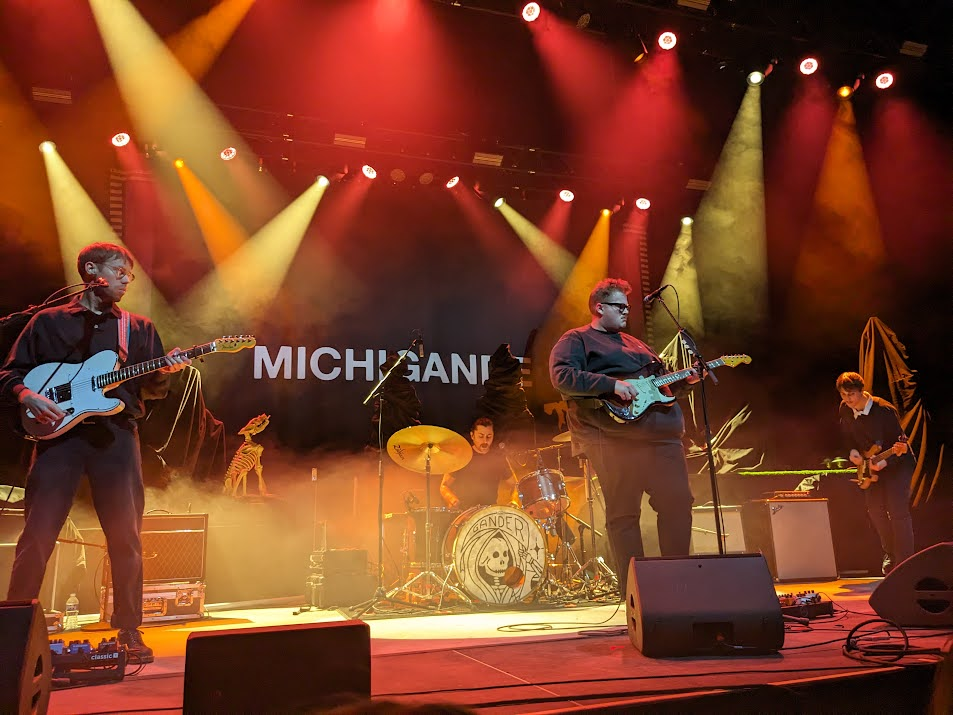
- Michigander performing live in 2023 at the Uptown Theater in Minneapolis.

Background information
- Origin: Kalamazoo and Midland, Michigan, U.S.
- Genres: Alternative rock; indie rock; pop rock; pop
- Years active: 2014–present
- Label: C3 Records; ThirtyTigers
- Members: Jason Singer
- Website: michiganderband.com

Michigander is an American rock band created in 2014 from Kalamazoo, Michigan. It is the solo project centered around its vocalist, songwriter and multi-instrumentalist frontman, Jason Singer.

The band is joined by touring musicians and frequent collaborators Jake LeMond on guitar, Aaron Senor on drums, and Connor Robertson on bass guitar.

Michigander's first song, the self-released Nineties single, debuted in 2016, followed by additional singles, including Mexico, and ATL, an Audiotree live session extended play, and the 2018 self-released Midland extended play, consisting of 6 tracks, all written solely by Singer.

Since then, the project has released three extended plays with C3 Records including Where Do We Go From Here (2019), Everything Will Be OK Eventually (2021), and the most recent, It Will Never Be The Same (2023) which was recorded at Sunset Sound in Hollywood, California. The EP features the single "In My Head", a collaboration with indie rock band Manchester Orchestra, and "Cannonball", a track written with Dashboard Confessional's frontman, Chris Carrabba.

== History ==
=== 2014–2018 ===
In 2015, Michigander began as Jason Singer began contacting college radio stations to play his music. He and his bandmates built a following by playing opening acts for better-known bands during local stops on their tours. Singer released his debut single as Michigander "Nineties" on April 29, 2016. The song gained traction on streaming services such as Spotify and Apple Music, culminating in additional singles Mexico and ATL. The momentum of these singles and the band's regular live performances caught the attention of local Detroit, Michigan Indie rock festival, Mo Pop, to which they performed at in July 2017, alongside artists like Foster the People and Alt-J. Michigander soon followed up these successes with an extended play Midland which was self-released in 2018. The project began touring around the United States in support of the extended play.

=== 2019–2025 ===
Following up the success of the Midland extended play, Michigander released Where Do We Go From Here with C3 Records in 2019. The band has since maintained a busy schedule, landing slots at the 2021 Lollapalooza in Chicago, Illinois, in support of their extended play Everything Will Be Ok Eventually released in 2021, and Austin City Limits in 2023, in support of their extended play It Will Never Be The Same released that same year. The band completed a tour supporting Manchester Orchestra and Foxing in 2022, and embarked on a tour with Andrew McMahon in the fall of 2023.

=== Self-titled album (2025) ===
Michigander's self-titled debut full-length album was released on Feb. 7, 2025. During this time the band went a tour called 'The Broadcast' that cover the US and UK. Several alternate versions of songs were released featuring JOSEPH, Ben Kweller, Taylor Goldsmith, and Andrew McMahon. This album cycle concluded with 'The Made In The Midwest' tour that included stops in; Lawerence, KS, Chicago, IL, Detroit, MI, Madison, WI, St Paul, MN, Cleveland, OH, and St Louis, MO.

=== Over Before You Know It album (2026–present) ===
On May 6, 2026, the band played a show at The Blue Room in Nashville, TN where they debuted the unreleased album live and in full. Later that week the first single "Freaking Out" was released. Shortly after, the album was announced via the band's social media.

Over Before You Know It was released on July 31, 2026.

== Discography ==
=== Albums ===
- Michigander (2025)
- Over Before You Know It (2026)

=== EPs ===
- Midland (2018)
- Where Do We Go from Here (2019)
- Everything Will Be OK Eventually (2022)
- It Will Never Be the Same (2023)

=== Singles ===
- "Nineties" (2016)
- "Mexico" (2016)
- "Tunnel" (2018)
- "Snow in Montana" (2022)
- "Giving Up" (2024)
- "Freaking Out" (2026) - #6 on AAA

== Band members ==
=== Current members ===
- Jason Singer – guitar / keys / vocals (2014–present)

=== Live touring members ===
- Aaron Senor – drums / percussion / backing vocals (2017–present)
- Jake LeMond – lead guitar / backing vocals (2018–present)
- Connor Robertson – bass guitar / backing vocals (2018–present)
- Dylan Grantham - electric guitar / backing vocals (2021 - present)

=== Former live touring members ===
- Madison George – drums / percussion (2014-2017)
