= Rainbow Kitten Surprise =

American alternative rock band

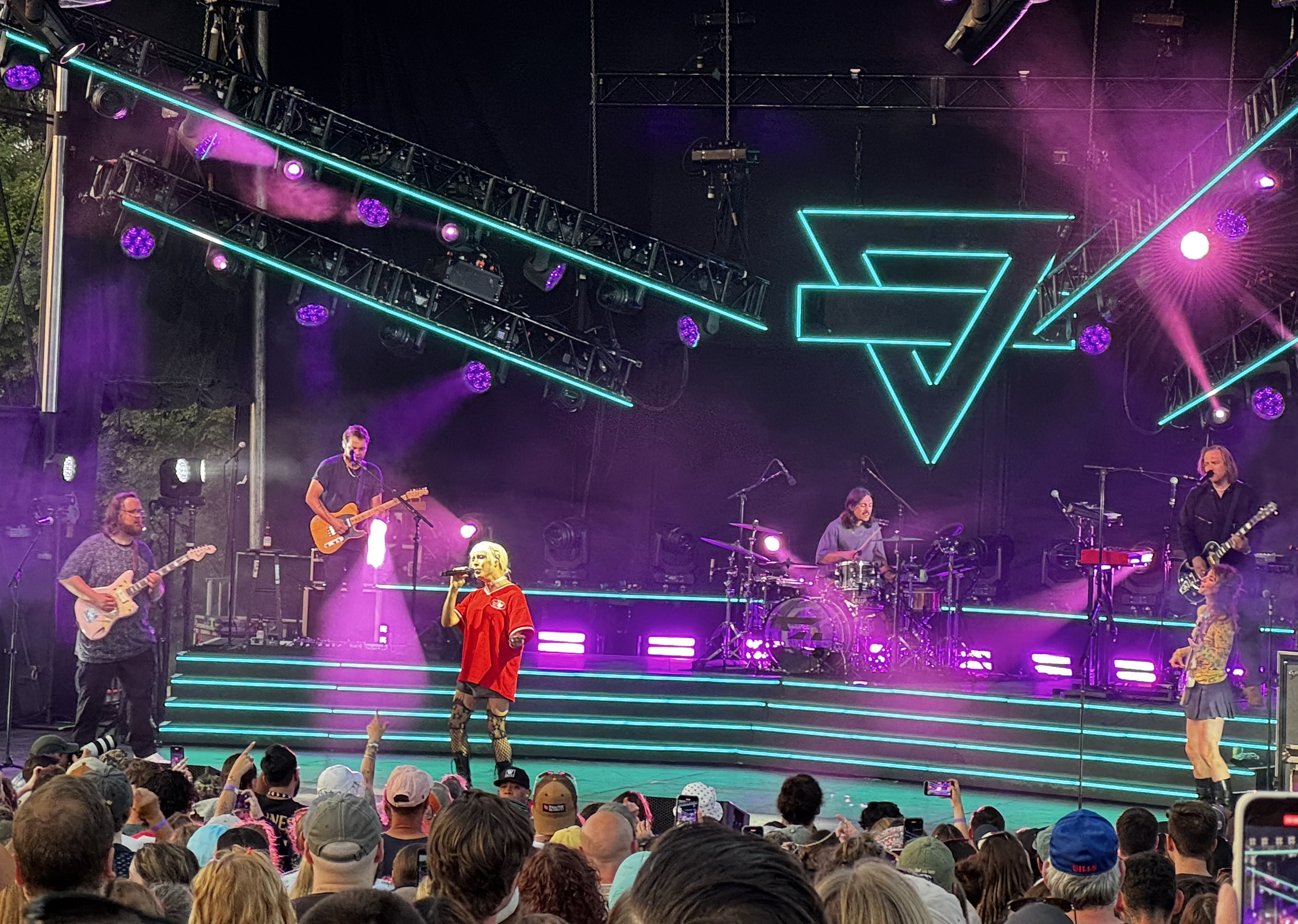
- Rainbow Kitten Surprise in 2025

Background information
- Also known as: RKS
- Origin: Boone, North Carolina
- Genres: Indie rock; alternative rock
- Years active: 2013–present
- Label: Elektra
- Members: Darrick "Bozzy" Keller; Ela Melo; Ethan Goodpaster; Jess Haney
- Past members: Charlie Holt
- Website: www.rksband.com

Rainbow Kitten Surprise is an American alternative rock indie band, featuring lead vocalist Ela Melo, Darrick "Bozzy" Keller (guitar, backup vocals), Ethan Goodpaster (electric guitar), and Jess Haney (drums). The band formed in Boone, North Carolina. Rainbow Kitten Surprise's sound has been influenced by artists such as Modest Mouse, Kings of Leon, Frank Ocean, and Schoolboy Q.

== History ==
Rainbow Kitten Surprise was formed in 2013 by Darrick Keller and Ela Melo in an Appalachian State University dorm room. The band's distinctive name came from a friend who had recently recovered from a serious illness. The duo recorded their first EP, Mary, in the same dorm room where the band began.

The band expanded to include three additional members: Ethan Goodpaster, Jess Haney, and Charlie Holt. RKS independently released their debut album Seven, which was subsequently re-released alongside their first EP as the joint album Seven + Mary. Initially, the band recorded under Split Rail Records, a student-run label at Appalachian State University's Hayes School of Music, where three band members were students.

Between 2014 and 2017, Rainbow Kitten Surprise built their reputation through performances at major music festivals, including Bonnaroo Music and Arts Festival and Austin City Limits Festival.

The band achieved broader recognition with the release of How To: Friend, Love, Freefall on April 6, 2018, through Elektra Records. This 13-track album included the single "Hide", notable for its music video depicting four drag queens coming out to their families as drag queens. Another single from the album, "Fever Pitch", reached number 34 on Billboard's Alternative Songs chart during spring 2018.

In May 2019, the band released Mary (B-Sides), featuring a studio recording of "Heart"—originally shared on YouTube and SoundCloud in 2014—alongside the new track "No Vacancy". The following January, Rainbow Kitten Surprise was featured in a half-hour set on the PBS programme Austin City Limits, recorded during autumn 2019. After nearly two years since their previous release, RKS returned with the single "Our Song" on October 9, 2020, a track that had been performed at various live events. This was followed by the live album RKS! Live from Athens Georgia on August 13, 2021, capturing 25 songs from a previous concert performance.

A significant moment for the band occurred on March 30, 2022, when lead singer Ela Melo came out as transgender. Just one week later, on April 6, 2022, the band released "Work Out", their first new single in nearly 18 months.

The band faced challenges in 2023 when they were forced to cancel their entire year of touring on May 24, following a bandmate's illness. Further changes came in March 2024 when the band announced their separation from bassist Charlie Holt. After Charlie Holt’s departure, lead vocalist Ela Melo explained that the band had been unable to find a way to continue working together. Maddie Bouton subsequently joined the group as its touring bassist, quickly earning positive feedback from fans for her energetic stage presence and strong musicianship. Although Bouton has played extensively with the band during its recent tours, fans generally describe her role as that of a touring member, while the group’s permanent studio lineup continues to develop.

The band's return to new music began on March 8, 2024, with the simultaneous release of lead single "Superstar" and fan track "LOL", which announced their fourth studio album Love Hate Music Box. This was followed by "Overtime" on April 5, 2024, marking the band's first artist collaboration, featuring Grammy-winning artist Kacey Musgraves. The single "SVO" followed on April 26, 2024, before the full album release. Love Hate Music Box was released on May 10, 2024, representing the band's most ambitious project since 2018. The album serves as a reflection on the numerous hardships Melo experienced over the previous six years.

The band continued their musical output with the release of "Espionage" on February 14, 2025, followed by "Dang" on July 18, 2025. Most recently, on August 6, 2025, Rainbow Kitten Surprise announced their album Bones, which released on September 26, 2025.

== Band members ==
=== Current members ===
- Darrick "Bozzy" Keller – rhythm guitar, background vocals (2013–present)
- Ela Melo – lead vocals, guitars (2013–present)
- Ethan Goodpaster – lead guitar, background vocals (2014–present)
- Jess Haney – drums, background vocals (2014–present)
- Maddie Bouton- touring and performance bassist (September 2024- present)

=== Former member ===
- Charlie Holt – bass guitar, background vocals (2014–2024)

== Discography ==
=== Studio albums ===
List of albums, with selected details and peak chart positions
Title	Album details	Peak chart positions		Certifications
Title	Album details	US	AUS	Certifications
Seven + Mary	Released: November 19, 2013; Label: RKS Recordings	—	—	
RKS	Released: April 25, 2015; Label: Split Rail	—	—	
How To: Friend, Love, Freefall	Released: April 6, 2018; Label: Elektra	—	—	RIAA: Gold
Love Hate Music Box	Released: May 10, 2024; Label: Elektra	142	—	
Bones	Released: September 26, 2025; Label: Atlantic	—	59	

=== Charted and certified songs ===
List of charted songs, with selected peak chart positions and certifications
Title	Year	Peak chart positions				Certifications	Album
Title	Year	CAN	UK	US AAA	US Alt	Certifications	Album
"First Class"	2013	—	—	—	—	RIAA: Gold	Seven + Mary
"Devil Like Me"	2013	—	—	—	—	RIAA: Platinum; RMNZ: Gold	Seven + Mary
"All That and More" (Sailboat)	2013	—	—	—	—	RIAA: Gold	Seven + Mary
"Cocaine Jesus"	2015	—	—	—	—	RIAA: Platinum	RKS
"It's Called: Freefall"	2018	98	78	—	—	RIAA: Platinum; ARIA: Platinum; MC: 2× Platinum; BPI: Silver; RMNZ: Platinum	How To: Friend, Love, Freefall
"Superstar"	2024	—	—	12	17		Love Hate Music Box
"Dang"	2025	—	—	23	25		Bones

=== Music videos ===
- "Devil Like Me" (March 1, 2014)
- "Cocaine Jesus" (May 1, 2015)
- "Bare Bones" (May 3, 2015)
- "Fever Pitch" (January 16, 2018)
- "Holy War" (February 23, 2018)
- "Hide" (April 3, 2018)
- "It's Called: Freefall" (January 28, 2019)
- "Work Out" (June 16, 2022)
- "LOL" (March 6, 2024)
- "Superstar" (March 8, 2024)
- "Dang" (July 19, 2025)
- "100 Summers" (August 22, 2025)
