= Blank Range =

American rock band

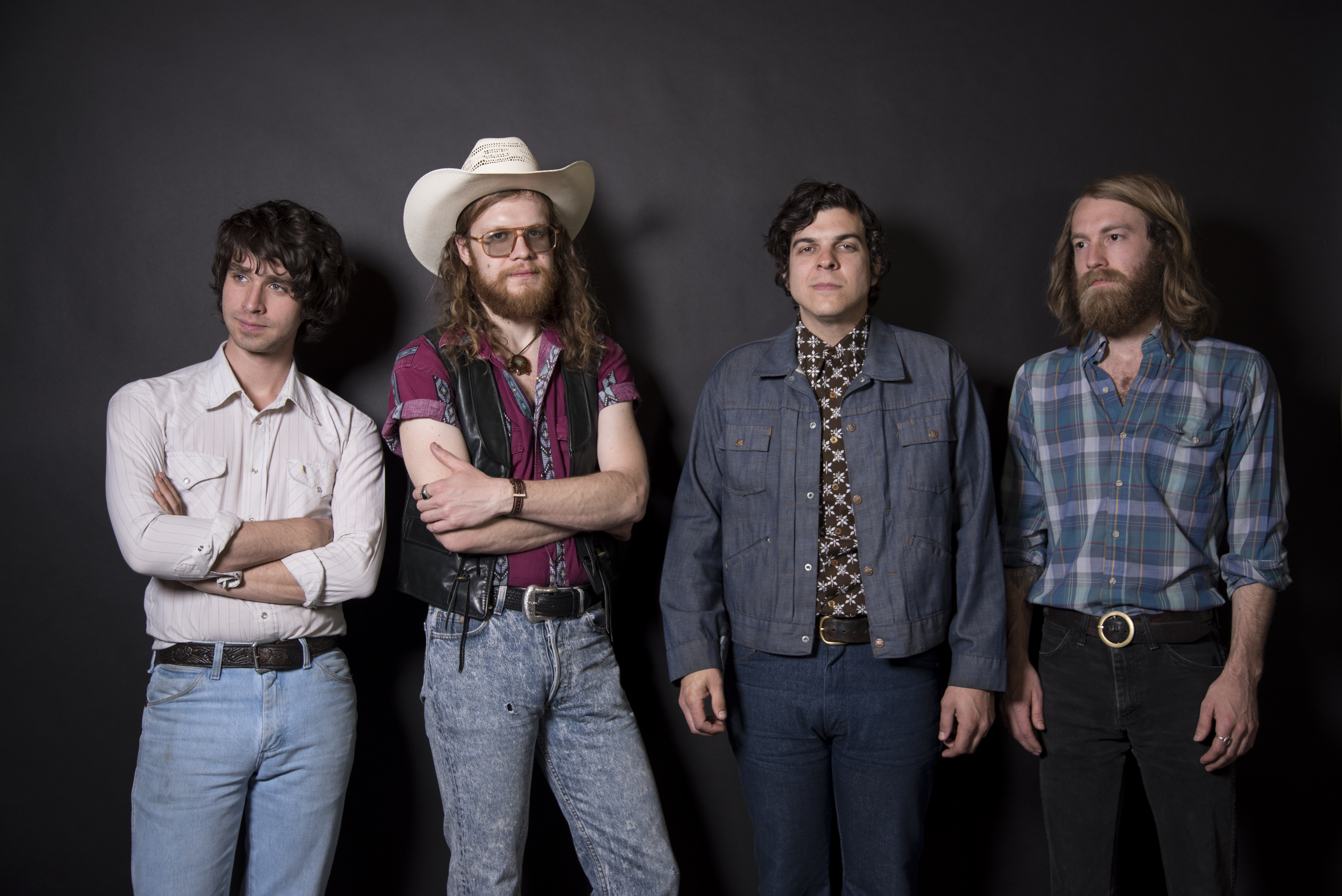
- Blank Range members Jonathon Childers, Matt Novotny, Grant Gustafson, and Taylor Zachry. Photo by Joey Martinez.

Background information
- Origin: Nashville, Tennessee, USA
- Genres: Rock, Southern rock
- Years active: 2013-present
- Label: Sturdy Girls Records
- Members: Jonathon Childers; Grant Gustafson; Matt Novotny; Taylor Zachry
- Website: blankrangemusic.com

Blank Range is an American rock band based out of Nashville, TN. The band consists of singer Jonathon Childers, drummer Matt Novotny, bassist Taylor Zachry, and guitarist/singer Grant Gustafson. Rolling Stone magazine describes their sound as a “magical combination of dissonant, Pavement-esque and pavement-ready garage rock & roll with a keen grasp of how to make it all wildly melodic — thanks to super-sticky riffs, restrained psychedelia and a sense of composition that's restless, surprising and pretty fearless.”

== Overview ==
Blank Range has opened for Margo Price, Tyler Childers, Spoon, Alice in Chains, Drive-By Truckers, and Death Cab for Cutie. Blank Range played Luck Reunion and Bonnaroo Music & Arts Festival in 2018. Blank Range uses amped-up guitars, steel-guitar atmospherics, complex subtle percussion additions, and vocal harmonies to produce textured music with qualities of blues, Americana, ’70s nostalgia, Nashville heartbreak, and psychedelic country-rock. Their debut album, Marooned With the Treasure, was released in 2017 and named Best Rock Album that year by the Nashville Scene. Blank Range is set to release their self-released sophomore album In Unison, on February 1st, 2019. Pittsburgh City Paper calls their new single, "Change Your Look" a raucous garage pop good time which effortlessly showcases their blistering grooves, sticky-sweet melodies, and whip-smart lyricism.

== Discography ==
=== Albums ===
Title	Album details
MAROONED WITH THE TREASURE: Release Date: August 2017; Label: Sturdy Girls Records / Thirty Tigers
IN UNISON	Release Date: February 2019

=== EPs ===
Title	Album details
PHASE II	Release Date: April 2013; Label: Sturdy Girls Records
VISTA BENT	Release Date: November 11, 2016; Label: Sturdy Girls Records

=== Singles ===
Title	Album details
Scrapin/Before I Go To Sleep	Release Date: November 2013; Label: Sturdy Girls Records
No Aim	Release Date: May 2017; Label: Sturdy Girls Records
