= List of Austin City Limits lineups by year =

The Austin City Limits Music Festival has had the following lineups.

== 2002 ==
2002 was the inaugural year of the festival. Unlike subsequent years, it was a 2-day event only. The festival, arranged by Charlie Jones and Charles Attal founders of C3 Presents, was thrown together in a matter of three or four months. The 2-day festival hosted 5 stages and 67 bands. One-day passes were $25. 42,000 people attended the event when only 25,000 were expected. The festival has grown every year since.

2002 Lineup
- Ryan Adams
- Arc Angels
- Asleep at the Wheel
- Joe Bonamassa
- Jane Bond
- Blind Boys of Alabama
- Caitlin Cary
- Gary Clark, Jr., W. C. Clark
- Shawn Colvin
- Cross Canadian Ragweed
- Karl Denson
- The Derailers
- Durden Family Singers
- Eyes Adrift
- Eric Johnson/Alien Love Child
- Faithful Gospel Stars
- Ruthie Foster
- David Garza
- G. Love & Special Sauce
- Gospel Stars
- The Gourds
- Jon Dee Graham
- Pat Green
- Patty Griffin
- Grupo Fantasma
- Emmylou Harris
- Caroline Herring
- The Jayhawks
- Karl Denson's Tiny Universe
- Kevin McKinney
- Li'l Cap'n Travis
- Los Lobos
- Luna
- James McMurtry
- Mighty Sincere Voices of Navasota
- Ramsay Midwood
- Monte Montgomery
- Abra Moore
- Allison Moorer
- The New Deal
- Nickel Creek
- Olospo
- Original Bells of Joy
- Particle, Patrice Pike & The Black Box
- Pauline Reese
- Robert Randolph
- Rebellion
- Rebirth Brass Band
- Reckless Kelly
- Rana
- Bob Schneider
- Soulive
- Sound Tribe Sector 9
- South Austin Jug Band
- Spacetruck
- The String Cheese Incident
- Topaz
- Weary Boys
- Gillian Welch
- Kelly Willis
- Wilco

== 2003 ==
The 2003 ACL Music festival took place September 19–21. With 100 bands performing, tickets increased to $65 for a three-day admission pass. Children under 10 were admitted for free when accompanied by an adult with a ticket.

2003 Lineup
- Asleep at the Wheel
- The Bells of Joy
- Jane Bond
- Ellida Bonet
- Doyle Bramhall
- Bright Eyes
- Richard Buckner
- Burke Sisters
- Café Tacvba
- Shawn Camp
- Caitlin Cary
- Rosanne Cash
- The Charlie Hunter Trio
- Cody ChesnuTT
- W. C. Clark
- Gary Clark, Jr.
- Shawn Colvin
- Corn Mo
- Cowgirl Sue
- Cross Canadian Ragweed
- The Damnations
- The Dandy Warhols
- Del Castillo
- Karl Denson's Tiny Universe
- The Derailers
- The Donavon Frankenreiter Band
- Drive-By Truckers
- The Durdens
- Steve Earle & the Dukes
- Tim Easton
- John Eddie
- Marcus Eddie
- Electric Church
- Endochine
- The Faithful Gospel Singers
- Jay Farrar
- Joe Firstman
- Ruthie Foster
- Michael Franti & Spearhead
- G. Love & Special Sauce
- Galactic
- Davíd Garza
- The Gospel Stars
- The Gospelaires
- The Gourds
- Al Green
- Pat Green
- Patty Griffin
- Wayne Hancock
- Ed Harcourt
- Ben Harper and the Innocent Criminals
- Terri Hendrix
- Sara Hickman
- Jack Ingram
- The Jellydots
- Mason Jennings
- Jack Johnson
- Robert Earl Keen
- Justin King
- Kaki King*
- Kings of Leon
- Jeff Klein
- Ben Kweller
- Jimmy Lafave
- Miranda Lambert
- Leftover Salmon
- Los Lobos
- Los Lonely Boys
- The Mavericks
- Joe McDermott
- Kevin McKinney
- Tift Merritt
- Midlake
- The Mighty Sincere Voices of Navasota
- Abra Moore
- Ian Moore
- Alexi Murdoch
- Beaver Nelson
- Nickel Creek
- North Mississippi Allstars
- O.A.R.
- Old 97's
- Beth Orton
- Particle
- Liz Phair
- The Pierces
- Patrice Pike
- The Polyphonic Spree
- Robert Randolph & the Family Band
- Rebirth Brass Band
- Reckless Kelly
- Pauline Reese
- R.E.M.
- Josh Ritter
- Bruce Robison
- Craig Ross
- Kermit Ruffins
- Bob Schneider
- Martin Sexton
- Billy Joe Shaver
- The Shields of Faith
- The Shins
- Small Wonders Puppet Theatre
- Mindy Smith
- South Austin Jug Band
- Soulive
- Spacetruck
- Spoon
- Mavis Staples
- The String Cheese Incident
- Paul Thorn
- Topaz
- J.T. Van Zandt
- Julieta Venegas
- Monte Warden
- Warrior
- Ween
- Keller Williams
- Lucinda Williams
- Steve Winwood
- Yo La Tengo
- Dwight Yoakam
- Sue Young
- Yonder Mountain String Band
- Natalie Zoe

== 2004 ==
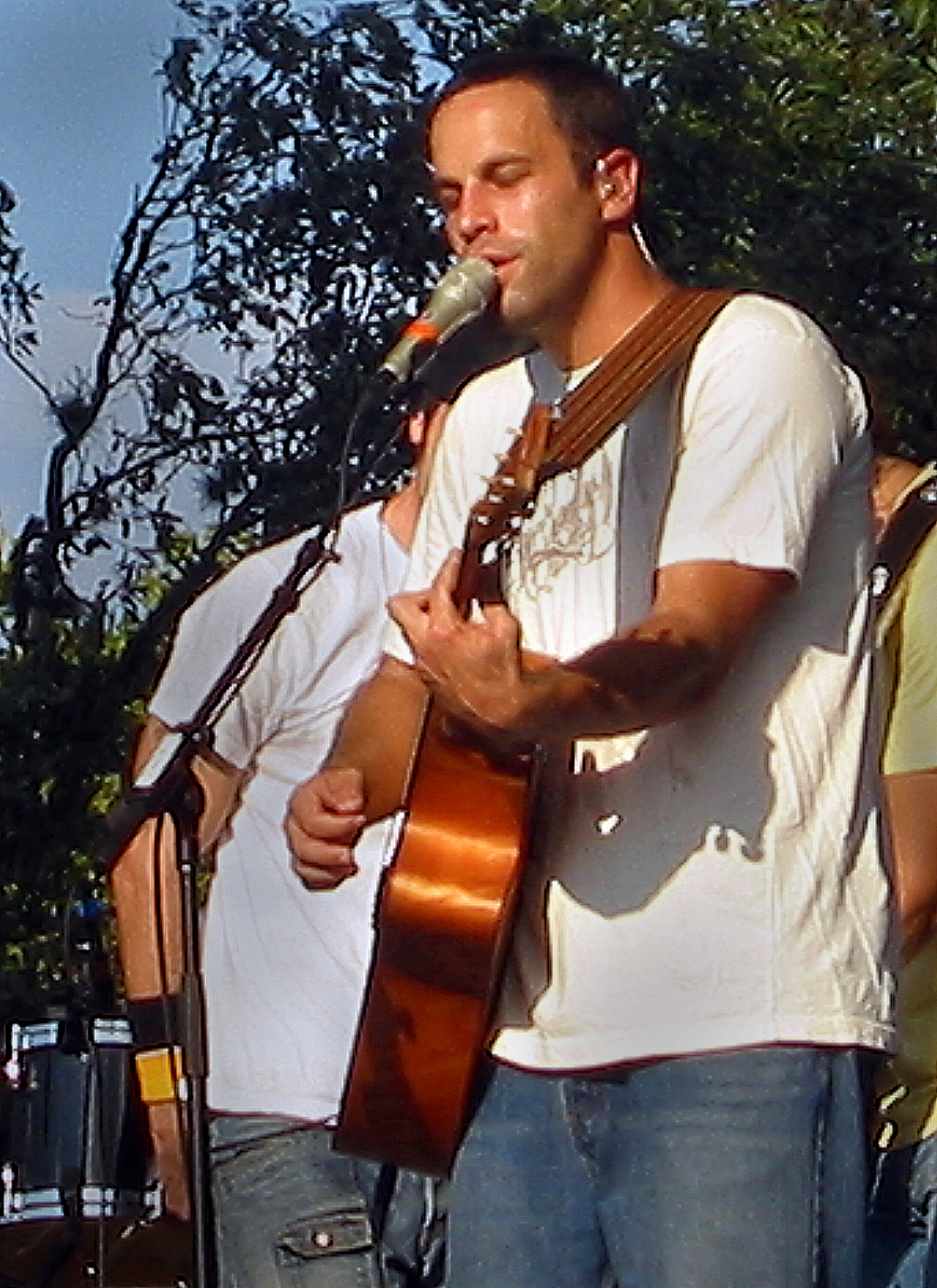
Jack Johnson at ACL 2004

The 2004 festival took place on September 17, 18 and 19. It had eight stages and, on the second day, a top attendance of 75,000 people. This spike in attendance forced the festival promoters to lower capacity per the request of surrounding neighborhood associations.

2004 Lineup
- Ryan Adams
- American Analog Set
- Terry Allen
- Trey Anastasio
- Anthropos Arts Student Band
- Antibalas Afrobeat Orchestra
- Asleep at the Wheel
- Marcia Ball
- Bobby Bare, Jr.
- The Bells of Joy
- Ben Harper
- Big Head Todd and the Monsters
- The Biscuit Brothers
- The Blind Boys of Alabama
- Broken Social Scene
- Doyle Bramhall
- Marc Broussard
- Clarence "Gatemouth" Brown
- Solomon Burke
- Henry Butler
- John Butler Trio
- Cake
- Calexico
- Rosanne Cash
- Cat Power
- Troy Campbell
- Neko Case
- Centro-matic
- Cooper's Uncle
- Elvis Costello and the Imposters
- Sheryl Crow
- Kacy Crowley
- Dashboard Confessional
- Howie Day
- Deadman
- The Dirty Dozen Brass Band
- Drive-By Truckers
- The Durdens
- Electric Church
- Joe Ely
- Endochine
- Franz Ferdinand
- Guy Forsyth
- Donavon Frankenreiter
- David Garza
- The Gospelaires
- The Gourds
- The Greencards
- G. Love & Special Sauce
- Gomez
- Pat Green
- Patty Griffin
- Butch Hancock
- Ben Harper and the Innocent Criminals
- Earl Harvin Trio
- Terri Hendrix
- The Holmes Brothers
- The Honorary Title
- Jack Ingram
- Mason Jennings
- Jack Johnson
- The Killers
- Dayna Kurtz
- Ben Kweller
- Los Lonely Boys
- Ray Lamontagne
- Tucker Livingston
- Louque
- Shelby Lynne
- Joe McDermott
- Medeski Martin & Wood
- Lucas Miller
- The Mighty Sincere Voices of Navasota
- Modest Mouse
- Monte Montgomery
- Abra Moore
- MOFRO
- Trish Murphy
- My Morning Jacket
- The Neville Brothers
- New Monsoon
- North Mississippi Allstars
- Old 97's
- Ollabelle
- Palm Elementary Choir
- Papa Mali
- Particle
- Patrice Pike
- The Pierces
- Pixies
- Davis Raines
- Rebirth Brass Band
- Reckless Kelly
- Bruce Robison
- The Roots
- Rose Hill Drive
- Josh Rouse
- Bob Schneider
- The Shields of Faith
- The Slip
- The Soundtrack of Our Lives
- Slightly Stoopid
- Sloan
- Mindy Smith
- Spoon
- Samantha Stollenwerck
- Star Kid's Yoga
- The Legendary Soul Stirrers
- Tea Leaf Green
- Toots & The Maytals
- Trout Fishing in America
- J.T. Van Zandt
- Rachael Yamagata
- Warrior
- The Wailers
- Walter "Wolfman" Washington & the Roadmasters
- Dale Watson
- Jason White
- Holly Williams
- Kelly Willis
- Wilco
- Willy Mason

== 2005 ==
The 2005 festival took place on September 23–25. The event coincided with a heat wave driven by Hurricane Rita, with temperatures reaching a record 108°F (42°C) on the festival's final day. Dust raised by the crowd under these dry conditions led the event to become known afterward as the "Dust Bowl" year. Festival organizers subsequently paid for part of the cost of a sprinkler system, which was installed in Zilker Park over the following three years. Three-day passes were sold for $105. The festival received Pollstar's Music Festival of the Year award for 2005.

2005 Lineup
- The Black Crowes
- Oasis
- Coldplay
- Lyle Lovett & His Large Band
- Roky Erickson and The Explosives
- The Allman Brothers Band
- Widespread Panic
- Wilco
- Robert Randolph & the Family Band
- John Prine
- Lucinda Williams
- Franz Ferdinand
- Buddy Guy
- Jet
- Dierks Bentley
- Thievery Corporation
- Arcade Fire
- Death Cab for Cutie
- Bob Mould Band
- Built to Spill
- Bloc Party
- Steve Earle & The Dukes with guest Allison Moorer
- Blues Traveler
- Gov't Mule
- Drive-By Truckers
- Kasabian
- Zap Mama
- Robert Earl Keen
- Keane
- Tortoise
- Doves
- The Black Keys
- Kaiser Chiefs
- Leo Kottke & Mike Gordon
- The Walkmen
- Jason Mraz
- Rilo Kiley
- Spoon
- The Decemberists
- The Bravery
- Eisley
- Blue October
- Grupo Fantasma
- Kermit Ruffins,
- The Dirty Dozen Brass Band
- Rev. Dan Willis & The All Nations Choir
- Morgan Heritage
- Ricardo Lemvo & Makina Loca
- Ruthie Foster
- deSol
- The Frames
- Mates of State
- Martin Sexton
- The Fiery Furnaces
- Aterciopelados (later canceled)
- Asleep at the Wheel
- M83
- Tegan and Sara
- Mike Doughty's Band
- Split Lip Rayfield
- Rachael Yamagata
- Bobby Bare, Jr.
- MOFRO
- The New Amsterdams
- Ambulance LTD
- Slightly Stoopid
- dios Malos
- Brave Combo
- Aqualung
- Dave Alvin & the Guilty Men
- John Butler Trio
- Bruce Robison
- What Made Milwaukee Famous
- Kevin Fowler
- Jack Ingram
- Cory Morrow
- Grady
- The Weary Boys
- Wayne "The Train" Hancock
- Monte Warden
- Zykos
- Sound Team
- Asylum Street Spankers
- Pong
- Oliver Future
- The Real Heroes
- Bukka Allen
- Hairy Apes BMX
- Nic Armstrong & The Thieves
- The Gospel Stars
- Donna the Buffalo
- The Shields of Faith
- Star Kids Yoga
- The Jones Family Singers
- St. James Inc.
- South Austin Jug Band
- The Lighthouse Singers
- Kacy Crowley
- Casey McPherson
- Tristan Prettyman
- The Massacoustics
- Joe McDermott
- Sara Hickman
- Anthropos
- The Palm Elementary School Choir
- Lucas Miller
- Imagination Movers
- Free Sõl
- Jeff Black
- Kate Earl
- KJAE
- Austin Hartley-Leonard
- Maneja Beto
- Austin Collins Band
- The Biscuit Brothers
- Patrick Davis
- Kelley Hunt
- The Experiment Experience
- The Blue Van

=== Last minute replacement acts ===
- Deadboy and the Elephantmen
- The Texiles featuring members of The Iguanas
- The Double
- Tracy Bonham and more

=== Cancellations ===
Several acts were scheduled to appear, but cancelled due to transportation issues arising from Hurricane Rita. They included:

- Bettye LaVette
- The Lost Trailers
- Nine Black Alps
- Kathleen Edwards
- Mindy Smith
- Ditty Bops
- Tegan and Sara (also listed in main lineup; clarification may be needed if they played or were fully cancelled)
- Missy Higgins
- Kate York
- Los Aterciopelados (also listed as "later canceled" in main lineup)
- Naturally 7 and numerous others.

== 2006 ==
The 2006 festival took place on September 15-17. In efforts to relieve festivalgoers, festival organizers added more misting and water stations and shade tents after what CultureMap Austin described as "the unbearable heat of [2005]." AT&T's Blue Room, a brand sponsored stage and interactive content hub, streamed live music sets from the festival online as part of its 2006 webcast lineup.

During his set, music artist Ben Kweller suffered a severe nosebleed and attempted to stop the bleeding with a tampon thrown to him by an audience member. “They like to keep these tour buses really dry and really fucking cold, ” Kweller said, trying to explain the nosebleed. “A hot bus is a sick bus, so it’s dry as hell on there." He continued playing "This Is War" and three more songs before festival paramedics and management staff ended his set and took him to a hospital.

The following day, The Flaming Lips frontman Wayne Coyne, referencing Kweller's injury, asked the audience to throw tampons onstage to help absorb the usual fake blood used in the band's performance.

2006 Lineup
- Van Morrison
- Tom Petty
- Willie Nelson
- Ben Harper
- Massive Attack
- John Mayer
- The String Cheese Incident
- The Flaming Lips
- The Raconteurs
- Ghostland Observatory
- Los Lonely Boys
- The Shins
- Ween
- Thievery Corporation
- Los Lobos
- Ben Kweller
- G. Love & Special Sauce
- Matisyahu
- Gnarls Barkley
- Cat Power and the Memphis Rhythm Band
- Ray Lamontagne
- Nickel Creek
- Damian "Jr Gong" Marley
- The Tragically Hip
- Kings of Leon
- Iron & Wine
- Kasey Chambers
- Aimee Mann
- Galactic
- The New Orleans Social Club
- Calexico
- The New Pornographers
- Son Volt
- Guster
- Explosions in the Sky
- Deadboy and the Elephantmen
- Secret Machines
- Jack Ingram
- Brazilian Girls
- Gomez
- Stars
- Wolf Parade
- Sparklehorse
- Paolo Nutini
- Nada Surf
- The Blue Van
- Los Amigos Invisibles
- Feist
- Phoenix
- KT Tunstall
- Donavon Frankenreiter
- Oliver Mtukudzi & Black Spirits
- Asleep at the Wheel
- Buckwheat Zydeco
- Husky Rescue
- Jimmie Dale Gilmore
- The Subdudes
- BoDeans
- The Greencards
- Guy Clark
- Kathleen Edwards
- The Long Winters
- The Stills
- Charlie Sexton
- Alexi Murdoch
- Pierre Guimard
- Matt Costa
- Matt Nathanson
- Okkervil River
- Ted Leo and the Pharmacists
- Sparta (later canceled)
- Benevento-Russo Duo
- Randy Rogers Band
- Federico Aubele
- What Made Milwaukee Famous
- Jose Gonzalez
- Ian McLagan and The Bump Band
- New Monsoon
- Del Castillo
- Fields
- Lou Ann Barton
- Beto and the Fairlanes
- I Love You But I've Chosen Darkness
- Brett Dennen
- TV on the Radio
- Centro-matic
- Marah
- Sam Roberts
- Rocky Votolato
- Murder by Death
- The Black Angels
- Anathallo
- The Rocket Summer
- Sara Hickman
- Sylvia St. James and The Gospel Stars
- Terri Hendrix
- Trish Murphy
- Patrice Pike
- The Durdens
- The Jones Family Singers
- Sterling Lands and The Warrior Gospel Band
- Joe McDermott and the Smart Little Creatures
- The Biscuit Brothers
- Imagination Movers
- Elvis Perkins
- The New Soul Invaders
- South Austin Jug Band
- Greyhounds
- Star Kids Yoga
- Joy Davis
- Daniella Cotton
- Troy Campbell Band
- The Palm Elementary School Choir
- Asheba
- White Ghost Shivers
- The Gospel Silvertones
- The Anointed Voicez
- Ghandaia
- Melissa Reaves
- Claire Small
- Eli Young Band
- Rodney Hayden
- Robyn Ludwick
- Peter Dawson Band
- Andrew Bird
- Mason Jennings
- Sufjan Stevens

== 2007 ==
The 2007 Austin City Limits Music Festival occurred September 14, 15 and 16 in Zilker Park. Several acts, including Amy Winehouse, The White Stripes and Rodrigo y Gabriela, cancelled their appearances at the festival for health reasons, the latter two on very short notice. The scheduled performance by Saturday headliner The White Stripes was replaced by moving already scheduled Muse into the headlining slot.

Other notable moments include Friday when a propane tank was ignited and a fire broke out in the service area, burning down two trailers and several port-o-potties. Four people who were working at the festival were injured, two of them seriously. A second fire broke out on the speaker stack at the AT&T stage during Björk's set, but it was quickly extinguished and no injuries were reported.

2007 Lineup
- Bob Dylan
- Björk
- The Killers
- Muse
- Arcade Fire
- Wilco
- My Morning Jacket
- Queens of the Stone Age
- Bloc Party
- Arctic Monkeys
- Gotan Project
- Joss Stone
- Damien Rice
- Robert Earl Keen
- Lucinda Williams
- Spoon
- Blue October
- Indigo Girls
- The Decemberists
- Paolo Nutini
- Regina Spektor
- Crowded House
- Common
- Steve Earle
- Ziggy Marley
- Stephen Marley
- Kaiser Chiefs
- LCD Soundsystem
- Devotchka
- Augustana
- Amos Lee
- M.I.A.
- Ben Kweller
- Clap Your Hands Say Yeah
- Andrew Bird
- Bela Fleck & The Flecktones
- Pete Yorn
- Ghostland Observatory
- Cross Canadian Ragweed
- Reverend Horton Heat
- Butch Walker
- Peter Bjorn and John
- Sound Tribe Sector 9
- Cold War Kids
- Yo La Tengo
- Joseph Arthur & The Lonely Astronauts,
- Zap Mama
- Blonde Redhead
- Eli Young Band
- Aterciopelados
- Heartless Bastards
- Raul Malo
- James Hunter
- Mighty Clouds of Joy
- Del McCoury Band
- Preservation Hall Jazz Band
- Andy Palacio & the Garifima Collective,
- Asleep at the Wheel
- Ryan Shaw
- Will Hoge
- The National
- BeauSoleil
- Midlake
- Grace Potter and the Nocturnals
- Railroad Earth
- Dax Riggs
- Sound Team
- The Legendary Soul Stirrers
- Charlie Musselwhite
- JJ Grey & Mofro
- Young Love
- The Dynamites featuring Charles Walker
- Ian Ball
- The Little Ones
- Manchester Orchestra
- Patterson Hood
- Billy Joe Shaver
- Fionn Regan
- Big Sam's Funky Nation
- John Ralston
- Dr. Dog
- The Broken West
- Rose Hill Drive
- Brandon Rhyder
- Ocote Soul Sounds
- Sara Hickman
- Jon Dee Graham
- Kevin Devine
- Ike Reilly Assassination
- Greyhounds
- Guy Forsyth
- Adam Hood
- Cary Ann Hearst & The Gun Street Girls
- The Jones Family Singers
- The Gospel Silvertones
- The Shields of Faith
- Sylvia St. James
- Jeffrey Steele
- Amy Cook
- Trent Summar & The New Row Mob
- Back Door Slam
- Mario Matteoli
- Kara Grainger
- One Mississippi
- Kevin McKinney
- Jennifer Nicely
- Sahara Smith
- The Wonderful Harmonizers
- Loretta Williams
- Gurnell
- Amy LaVere
- The Paul Green School of Rock All-Stars
- The Steps
- We Go To 11
- The Sippy Cups
- Daddy A Go Go
- Farmer Jason
- Q Brothers
- Jambo
- The Bummkinn Band
- Cecil Jorgensen
- The Jellydots

== 2008 ==
The 2008 edition took place September 26–28, 2008.

2008 Lineup
- Foo Fighters
- Robert Plant & Alison Krauss
- Beck
- The Mars Volta
- Manu Chao
- David Byrne
- John Fogerty
- The Raconteurs
- Gnarls Barkley
- Conor Oberst and the Mystic Valley Band
- N.E.R.D.
- Erykah Badu
- Robert Earl Keen
- Patty Griffin
- Tegan & Sara
- Iron & Wine
- G. Love & Special Sauce
- Neko Case
- Band of Horses
- The Swell Season
- Silversun Pickups
- Gogol Bordello
- Gillian Welch
- Eli Young Band
- The Black Keys
- Against Me!
- Jakob Dylan and the Gold Mountain Rebels
- Okkervil River
- Galactic
- Kevin Fowler
- Sharon Jones & The Dap-Kings
- Hot Chip
- Vampire Weekend
- Slightly Stoopid
- Alejandro Escovedo
- Blues Traveler
- Roky Erickson
- Yonder Mountain String Band
- Spiritualized
- Flyleaf
- Fleet Foxes
- Drive-By Truckers
- Old 97's
- Stars
- José González
- CSS
- Del the Funky Homosapien
- Man Man
- Jamie Lidell
- MGMT
- The Fratellis
- What Made Milwaukee Famous
- M. Ward
- Jenny Lewis
- Asleep at the Wheel
- Mason Jennings
- Heartless Bastards
- Antibalas
- The Nachito Herrera All-Stars
- Shooter Jennings
- Xavier Rudd
- Yeasayer
- Octopus Project
- Joe Bonamassa
- The Kills
- White Denim
- Louis XIV
- Delta Spirit
- Abigail Washburn and the Sparrow Quartet featuring Béla Fleck
- Rodney Crowell
- Mates of State
- Nicole Atkins & The Sea
- Electric Touch
- Black Joe Lewis & the Honey Bears
- Dan Dyer
- Back Door Slam
- Tristan Prettyman
- The Strange Boys
- Ryan Bingham
- The Black and White Years
- Scott H. Biram
- Les Frères Guissé
- Priscilla Ahn
- Freddy Jones
- Colour Revolt
- Five Times August
- Langhorne Slim
- Sybris
- Mugison
- Eli "Paper Boy" Reed and the True Loves
- Bavu Blakes & the Extra Plairs
- AA Bondy
- Christopher Denny
- Mike Farris
- The Lee Boys
- South Austin Jug Band
- American Bang
- Bobby Bare, Jr.
- Massacoustics
- The Belleville Outfit
- We Go to 11
- The M's
- Band of Heathens
- City and Colour
- Sunny Sweeney
- Elizabeth Wills
- Bonnie Bishop
- Ben Sollee
- Ben Cylus
- The Concert Supremes
- River City Christionettes
- Shields of Faith
- The Steps
- The Jones Family Singers
- Nakia and his Southern Cousins
- Brotherly Luv
- The Hensley Ensemble
- School of Rock
- Jambo
- Q Brothers
- Buck Howdy with BB
- Uncle Rock
- Big Don
- Mr. Ray
- The Jimmies

== 2009 ==
The 2009 festival took place on October 2–4, 2009. This year's festival is most commonly remembered as the one when torrential rains which started falling on Saturday afternoon turned the new grass turf into slick fields of Dillo Dirt mud.

2009 Lineup

Friday, October 2:

- Kings of Leon
- Yeah Yeah Yeahs
- Thievery Corporation
- John Legend
- Them Crooked Vultures
- Coheed and Cambria
- Andrew Bird
- Phoenix
- Bassnectar
- Medeski, Martin & Wood
- Avett Brothers
- Reckless Kelly
- Los Amigos Invisibles
- The Walkmen
- Asleep at the Wheel
- Robyn Hitchcock and the Venus 3
- Poi Dog Pondering
- Dr. Dog
- Blitzen Trapper
- The Knux
- Daniel Johnston
- School of Seven Bells
- Todd Snider
- Walter "Wolfman" Washington
- K'Naan
- The Greencards
- The Wood Brothers
- Sara Watkins
- The Parlor Mob
- The Low Anthem
- Leatherbag
- Jonell Mosser
- Sarah Siskind
- Nelo
- The Gospel Silvertones
- Diaconos
- Prescott Curlywolf

Saturday, October 3:

- Dave Matthews Band
- Ghostland Observatory
- The Levon Helm Band
- Mos Def
- The Decemberists
- Flogging Molly
- Citizen Cope
- STS9 (Sound Tribe Sector 9)
- Bon Iver
- Mutemath
- !!!
- ...And You Will Know Us by the Trail of Dead
- DeVotchka
- The Scabs
- Grizzly Bear
- The Airborne Toxic Event
- The Raveonettes (no show, Neon Indian fill-in)
- Federico Aubele
- The Felice Brothers
- Eek-A-Mouse
- Henry Butler
- Zac Brown Band
- John Vanderslice
- The Virgins
- Alberta Cross
- Sam Roberts Band
- Bell X1
- Deer Tick
- The Henry Clay People
- Cotton Jones
- Papa Mali
- Jonathan Tyler and the Northern Lights
- Mimicking Birds
- Sarah Jaffe
- The Soul Stirrers
- Jeffrey Steele
- Damien Horne
- Palm School Elementary
- Quinn Sullivan
- The Dexateens

Sunday, October 4:

- Pearl Jam
- Ben Harper and Relentless7
- The Dead Weather
- Toadies
- The B-52's
- Arctic Monkeys
- Clutch
- Michael Franti & Spearhead
- Girl Talk
- Dirty Projectors
- Passion Pit
- Heartless Bastards
- White Lies
- Dan Auerbach
- Raul Malo
- Brett Dennen
- The Dodos
- Preservation Hall
- Black Joe Lewis & the Honeybears
- State Radio
- Here We Go Magic
- David Garza
- Sixto Diaz Rodriguez
- Marva Wright
- Rebirth Brass Band
- Terri Hendrix
- Alela Diane
- Lisa Hannigan
- L.A.X.
- Suckers
- Sons of Bill
- Jypsi
- Danny Brooks
- Reverend Peyton's Big Damn Band
- The Durdens
- Vince Mira
- Keith Gattis

== 2010 ==
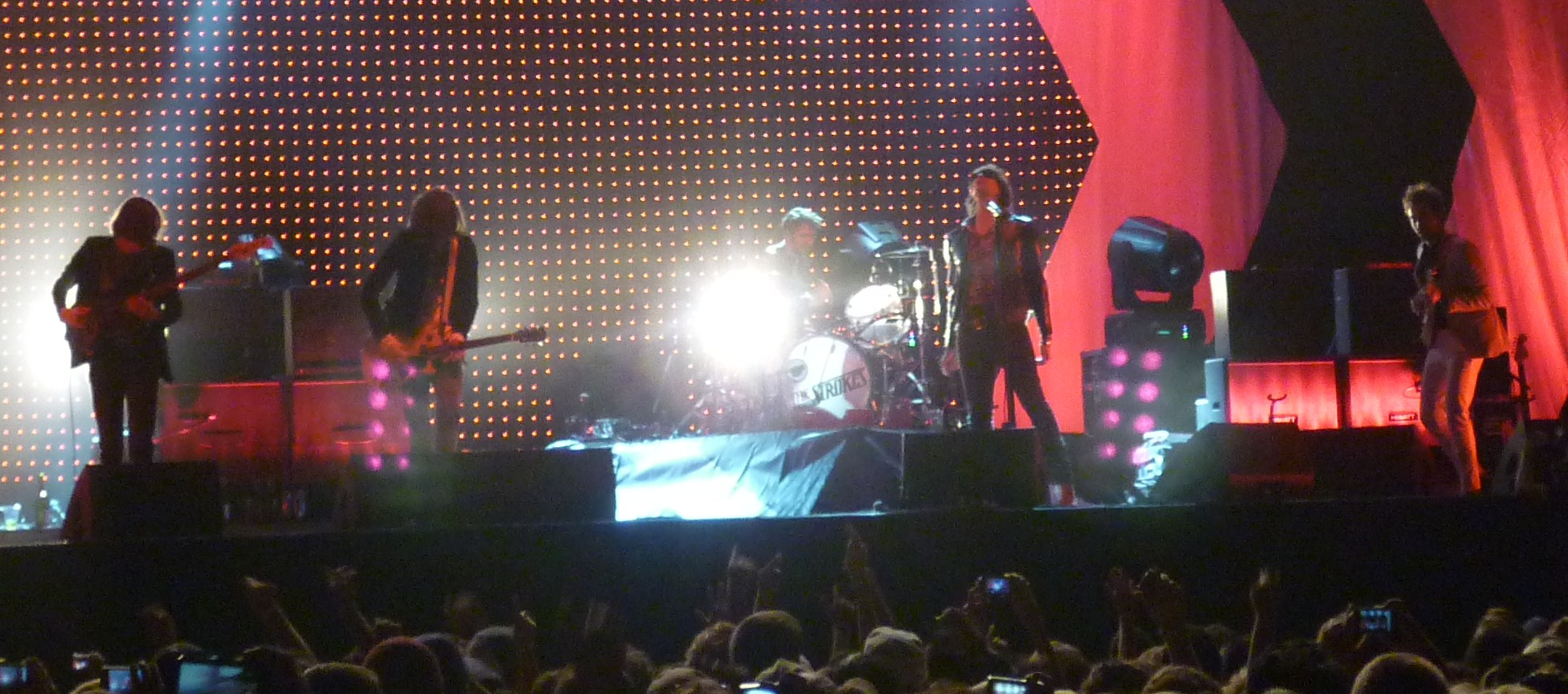
The Strokes performing at Austin City Limits in 2010.

The 2010 festival took place on October 8–10, 2010. The performers included The Eagles, Phish, Muse, The Strokes, and M.I.A.

2010 Lineup

Friday, October 8:

- Phish
- The Strokes
- Spoon
- Vampire Weekend
- Sonic Youth
- The Black Keys
- Slightly Stoopid
- Beach House
- The Sword
- Girls
- Miike Snow
- Ryan Bingham & the Dead Horses
- Blues Traveler
- The Soft Pack
- Amos Lee
- Robert Randolph and the Family Band
- JJ Grey & Mofro
- The Mountain Goats
- Donavon Frankenreiter
- Asleep at the Wheel
- Nortec Collective Presents: Bostich + Fussible
- Angus & Julia Stone
- The Band of Heathens
- Givers
- Charlie Mars
- Sarah Harmer
- Chief
- Those Darlins
- Carolyn Wonderland
- Kings Go Forth
- The Ettes
- Vonnegutt
- Qbeta
- Sahara Smith
- Ponderosa
- The Kicks
- Two Tons of Steel
- Gospel Stars
- Hockey
- The School of Rock All Stars
- The Jellydots
- The Verve Pipe
- Okee Dokee Brothers
- Tom Freund
- Wesley Bray & the Disciples of Joy

Saturday, October 9:

- Muse
- M.I.A.
- Monsters of Folk
- LCD Soundsystem
- Deadmau5
- Gogol Bordello
- Broken Bells
- Pat Green
- The xx
- Silversun Pickups
- Matt and Kim
- The Temper Trap
- Local Natives
- The Gaslight Anthem
- Lucero
- Pete Yorn
- Ozomatli
- Manchester Orchestra
- Black Lips
- Bear in Heaven
- Kinky
- Mayer Hawthorne & the County
- David Bazan
- The Very Best
- Beats Antique
- Grace Potter and the Nocturnals
- Two Door Cinema Club
- Lissie
- First Aid Kit
- Ninjasonik
- Dan Black
- Balmorhea
- The Dough Rollers
- Caitlin Rose
- The Jane Shermans
- Run With Bulls
- Heavenly Voices
- Jones Family Singers
- The Jellydots
- Elizabeth Mitchell
- Tom Freund
- Frances England
- Sugar Free All-Stars
- Basia Bulat
- Peter DiStefano and Tor

Sunday, October 10:

- The Eagles
- The Flaming Lips
- Band of Horses
- Norah Jones
- Robert Earl Keen
- The National
- Yeasayer
- Portugal. The Man
- Rebelution
- Edward Sharpe and the Magnetic Zeros
- Devendra Banhart and the Grogs
- Shearwater
- Maxim Ludwig & the Santa Fe Seven
- Foals
- The Morning Benders
- Sugar Free All-Stars
- Elizabeth Mitchell
- White Rabbits
- Okee Dokee Brothers
- Q Brothers (JAQ and GQ)
- Frances England
- The Verve Pipe
- TV Torso
- Frank Turner
- Dawes
- The Constellations
- Midlake
- Switchfoot
- Cage the Elephant
- Ruby Jane
- Speak
- JD & the Straight Shot
- MyNameIsJohnMichael
- The Henry Clay People
- T Bird and the Breaks
- Buddy & the Straight Way Travelers
- Ashley Cleveland & Kenny Greenberg
- The Relatives
- Trombone Shorty & Orleans Avenue
- Martin Sexton
- Richard Thompson
- Warpaint
- Blind Pilot
- Lance Herbstrong
- Ted Leo and the Pharmacists

== 2011 ==
ACL Festival celebrated its 10th anniversary on September 16–18, 2011. The official lineup was announced on May 17, 2011.

2011 Lineup

Friday, September 16:

- Kanye West
- Coldplay
- Nas & Damian "Jr Gong" Marley
- Bright Eyes
- Santigold
- Pretty Lights
- Big Boi
- Ray LaMontagne
- Cold War Kids
- Delta Spirit
- Foster the People
- Smith Westerns
- Mavis Staples
- Jack Ingram
- James Blake
- Sara Bareilles
- Wild Beasts
- Brandi Carlile
- Gary Clark Jr.
- The Secret Sisters
- Phosphorescent
- Charles Bradley
- Reptar
- Beardyman
- An Horse
- Asleep at the Wheel
- Futurebirds
- Theophilus London
- The Cave Singers
- Ha Ha Tonka
- Cults
- Francisca Valenzuela
- Miniature Tigers
- Hudson Moore
- Bobby Long
- The Bells Of Joy
- Disciples of Christ
- Sara Hickman
- The School of Rock
- Heidi Swedburg
- Mariana Iranzi
- Brady Rymer

Saturday, September 17:

- Stevie Wonder
- My Morning Jacket
- Alison Krauss & Union Station
- Cee Lo Green
- Cut Copy
- TV On The Radio
- Skrillex
- Iron & Wine
- Chromeo
- Gillian Welch
- Fitz and the Tantrums
- Court Yard Hounds
- Young The Giant
- Alexander
- J Roddy Walston and the Business
- Preservation Hall Jazz Band and The Del McCoury Band
- City and Colour
- Twin Shadow
- The Antlers
- Wanda Jackson
- Abigail Washburn & The Village
- The Belle Brigade
- Aloe Blacc & The Grand Scheme
- Daniel Lanois' Black Dub
- Fool's Gold
- Patrice Pike
- The Moondoggies
- Cowboy and Indian
- Jon Pardi
- The Warrior Gospel Band
- Endurance
- Tyree Morris & The Hearts of Worship
- Recess Monkey
- Fresh Millions
- Tyler Bryant
- The Kingston Springs
- Chancellor Warhol

Sunday, September 18:

- Arcade Fire
- Manu Chao
- Fleet Foxes
- Social Distortion
- Empire of the Sun
- Randy Newman
- Ryan Bingham & The Dead Horses
- Broken Social Scene
- Death From Above 1979
- The Airborne Toxic Event
- Elbow
- The Walkmen
- Chiddy Bang
- Gomez
- Awolnation
- Hayes Carll
- North Mississippi Allstars
- Dale Earnhardt Jr. Jr.
- The Head and the Heart
- Mariachi El Bronx
- Joseph Arthur
- Bomba Estereo
- Mona
- The Vaccines (Canceled due to Justin Young's health issues)
- The Greencards
- Nick 13
- Ruby Jane
- Little Hurricane
- MilkDrive
- The Lee Boys
- The Durdens
- Peter DiStefano & Tor
- The Q Brothers
- Quinn Sullivan
- The Barton Hills Choir
- Seth Walker
- Courtney Jaye
- Pernikoff Brothers

== 2012 ==
Austin City Limits took place from October 12–14, 2012. The official lineup was announced on May 22, 2012.

2012 Lineup

Friday, October 12:

- The Black Keys
- Avicii
- Weezer
- Florence + the Machine
- M83
- The Afghan Whigs
- Asleep at the Wheel
- Delta Spirit
- Lance Herbstrong
- Black Lips
- Esperanza Spalding
- Tegan and Sara
- The War on Drugs
- Patrick Watson (musician)
- Alabama Shakes
- Los Campesinos!
- The Wombats
- First Aid Kit
- Ben Howard
- A-Trak
- Hullabaloo
- Quiet Corral
- Ralph's World
- LP
- Jovanotti
- Trampled by Turtles
- M. Ward
- Megan McCormick
- Justin Jones
- Patterson Hood
- Soul Rebels
- Umphrey's McGee

Saturday, October 13:

- Neil Young and Crazy Horse
- Jack White
- The Roots
- The Shins
- Bassnectar
- Rufus Wainwright
- Gotye
- Metric
- Dev
- The Whigs
- Caveman
- Zola Jesus
- Big K.R.I.T.
- Big Gigantic
- Jambo
- Quiet Company
- Wild Child
- Dry the River
- Father John Misty
- Michael Kiwanuka
- Punch Brothers
- Steve Earle
- Kishi Bashi
- Sonambulo
- La Vida Boheme
- Antibalas
- The Deep Dark Woods
- Bombay Bicycle Club
- Oberhofer
- Band of Skulls
- Civil Twilight

Sunday, October 14:

- Red Hot Chili Peppers
- Iggy & The Stooges
- The Avett Brothers
- The Boxer Rebellion
- Crystal Castles
- Childish Gambino
- Die Antwoord
- The Civil Wars
- Gary Clark Jr.
- Kimbra
- Two Door Cinema Club
- The Features
- The Dunwells
- Willis Earl Beal
- Freelance Whales
- Jambo
- The School of Rock
- Ralph's World
- The Devil Makes Three
- The Eastern Sea
- Bad Books
- The Lumineers
- Old 97's
- Randy Rogers Band
- Thundercat
- Ruthie Foster
- Barrington Levy
- Alt-J
- Needtobreathe
- Tennis
- The Weeknd (cancelled)

== 2013 ==
For the first time, the Austin City Limits Music Festival was split across two weekends with matching lineups: October 4–6 and October 11–13, 2013.

=== Weekend 1 ===
Weekend 1 Lineup (2013)

Friday, October 4:

- Depeche Mode
- Muse
- Vampire Weekend
- Queens of the Stone Age
- Arctic Monkeys
- fun.
- Kaskade
- Local Natives
- Jimmy Eat World
- The Black Angels
- Okkervil River
- Purity Ring
- Smith Westerns
- Pinback
- The Jon Spencer Blues Explosion
- Wild Belle
- Court Yard Hounds
- Thao & the Get Down Stay Down
- Savages
- Fidlar
- The Blind Boys of Alabama
- Jake Bugg
- Wild Nothing
- Electric Six
- Shovels & Rope
- Widowspeak
- Asleep at the Wheel
- JD McPherson
- Pacha Massive
- The Orwells
- Desert Noises
- Holly Williams
- Wick-it The Instigator
- Houndmouth
- Dana Falconberry
- Latasha Lee & The BlackTies
- Brooke Waggoner
- Bells of Joy
- Barton Hills Choir
- Play Date
- Grace London
- Tim and the Space Cadets
- School of Rock

Saturday, October 5:

- The Cure
- Kings of Leon
- Wilco
- Passion Pit
- Kendrick Lamar
- The Shouting Matches
- Grimes
- Portugal. The Man
- Silversun Pickups
- The Joy Formidable
- The Bright Light Social Hour
- The Mavericks
- HAIM
- Junip
- Walk the Moon
- Vintage Trouble
- Lissie
- Little Green Cars
- Autre Ne Veut
- Parquet Courts
- True Believers
- Delta Rae
- Electric Guest
- Dan Croll
- Deap Vally
- Hundred Waters
- Reignwolf
- Mona
- Greensky Bluegrass
- Valerie June
- The Weeks
- Wild Cub
- Bobby Jealousy
- Max Frost
- Colin Lake
- Endurance
- Disciples of Christ
- The Warrior Gospel Band
- Caspar Babypants
- The Verve Pipe
- Andy Z
- The Ohmies
- Tim and the Space Cadets with Mother Falcon

Sunday, October 6:

- Atoms For Peace
- Lionel Richie
- Phoenix
- The National
- Eric Church
- Franz Ferdinand
- Tame Impala
- Toro Y Moi
- Neko Case
- Divine Fits
- Grouplove
- Shuggie Otis
- Dawes
- Noah and the Whale
- Paper Diamond
- Phosphorescent
- Foxygen
- White Denim
- Kodaline
- The Lone Bellow
- Typhoon
- Twin Forks
- Red Baraat
- Ms Mr
- Bear Mountain
- The Mowgli's
- Wild Feathers
- Roadkill Ghost Choir
- JC Brooks and the Uptown Sound
- The Band of Heathens
- Shinyribs
- Aaron Behrens and the Midnight Stroll
- Peterson Brothers Band
- Courrier
- Kristin Diable & The City
- The Stapletones
- The McCrary Sisters
- The Durdens
- Caspar Babypants
- The Verve Pipe
- Play Date
- Peter DiStefano & Tor
- The Ohmies
- The Q Brothers

=== Weekend 2 ===
Due to heavy rains and flash floods, the festival was cancelled on day 3 of weekend 2.

Weekend 2 Lineup (2013)

Friday, October 11:

- Depeche Mode
- Muse
- Vampire Weekend
- Queens of the Stone Age
- Arctic Monkeys
- fun.
- Kaskade
- Local Natives
- Jimmy Eat World
- The Black Angels
- Okkervil River
- Purity Ring
- Smith Westerns
- Pinback
- The Jon Spencer Blues Explosion
- Wild Belle
- Court Yard Hounds
- Thao & The Get Down Stay Down
- Savages
- FIDLAR
- The Blind Boys of Alabama
- Jake Bugg
- Wild Nothing
- Electric Six
- Shovels & Rope
- Widowspeak
- Asleep at the Wheel
- JD McPherson
- Pacha Massive
- The Orwells
- Desert Noises
- Holly Williams
- The Dynamites feat. Charles Walker
- Luella and the Sun
- Sons Of Fathers
- The Preservation
- Andrew Duhon
- Bells of Joy
- Barton Hills Choir
- Caspar Babypants
- The Verve Pipe
- Play Date
- Tim and the Space Cadets with Mother Falcon
- School of Rock

Saturday, October 12:

- The Cure
- Kings of Leon
- Wilco
- Passion Pit
- Kendrick Lamar
- The Shouting Matches
- Grimes
- Portugal. The Man
- Silversun Pickups
- The Joy Formidable
- The Bright Light Social Hour
- The Mavericks
- HAIM
- Junip
- WALK THE MOON
- Vintage Trouble
- Lissie
- Little Green Cars
- Autre Ne Veut
- Parquet Courts
- True Believers
- Delta Rae
- Electric Guest
- Dan Croll
- Deap Vally
- Hundred Waters
- Reignwolf
- Mona
- Greensky Bluegrass
- Valerie June
- Cherub
- Shakey Graves
- My Jerusalem
- Whiskey Shivers
- Shannon LaBrie
- Tyree Morris & The Hearts of Worship
- Disciples of Christ
- The Warrior Gospel Band
- Caspar Babypants
- The Verve Pipe
- Play Date
- The Ohmies
- Tim and the Space Cadets with Mother Falcon

Sunday, October 13:

- Atoms For Peace (Cancelled due to weather)
- Lionel Richie (Cancelled due to weather)
- Phoenix (Cancelled due to weather)
- The National (Cancelled due to weather)
- Eric Church (Cancelled due to weather)
- Franz Ferdinand (Cancelled due to weather)
- Tame Impala (Cancelled due to weather)
- Toro Y Moi (Cancelled due to weather)
- Neko Case (Cancelled due to weather)
- Divine Fits (Cancelled due to weather)
- Grouplove (Cancelled due to weather)
- Shuggie Otis (Cancelled due to weather)
- Dawes (Cancelled due to weather)
- Noah and the Whale (Cancelled due to weather)
- Paper Diamond (Cancelled due to weather)
- Phosphorescent (Cancelled due to weather)
- Foxygen (Cancelled due to weather)
- White Denim (Cancelled due to weather)
- The Lone Bellow (Cancelled due to weather)
- Lance Herbstrong (Cancelled due to weather)
- Typhoon (Cancelled due to weather)
- Twin Forks (Cancelled due to weather)
- Red Baraat (Cancelled due to weather)
- MS MR (Cancelled due to weather)
- Smallpools (Cancelled due to weather)
- Bear Mountain (Cancelled due to weather)
- The Mowgli's (Cancelled due to weather)
- Wild Feathers (Cancelled due to weather)
- Roadkill Ghost Choir (Cancelled due to weather)
- JC Brooks and the Uptown Sound (Cancelled due to weather)
- The Band of Heathens (Cancelled due to weather)
- Alanna Royale (Cancelled due to weather)
- X Ambassadors (Cancelled due to weather)
- Not in the Face (Cancelled due to weather)
- CALEB (Cancelled due to weather)
- Heavenly Voices Choir (Cancelled due to weather)
- The McCrary Sisters (Cancelled due to weather)
- The Durdens (Cancelled due to weather)
- Grace London (Cancelled due to weather)
- Peter DiStefano & Tor (Cancelled due to weather)
- The Ohmies (Cancelled due to weather)
- School of Rock (Cancelled due to weather)
- The Q Brothers (Cancelled due to weather)

== 2014 ==
Austin City Limits Music Festival was held over two weekends: October 3–5 and October 10–12, 2014. Forbes called it one of five American music festivals to look forward to.

=== Weekend 1 ===
Weekend 1 Lineup (2014)

Friday, October 3:

- Outkast
- Beck
- Foster The People
- Belle & Sebastian
- Childish Gambino
- Chvrches
- Jimmy Cliff
- St. Vincent
- The Glitch Mob
- Capital Cities
- Paolo Nutini
- Sam Smith
- Blackberry Smoke
- Lake Street Dive
- Temples
- Ozomatli
- Bleachers
- Ana Tijoux
- Saints of Valory
- J. Roddy Walston & The Business
- Robert Ellis
- Jon Batiste and Stay Human
- The Preatures
- Night Terrors of 1927
- Young & Sick
- James Bay
- Blank Range
- Asleep at the Wheel
- Moats
- Jon Pardi
- Los Colognes
- Marc Scibilia
- Sphynx
- Arum Rae
- The Jones Family Singers
- Shields of Faith
- The Barton Hills Choir w/ Special Guest Stuart Murdoch
- Ralph's World
- Elizabeth McQueen
- Sugar Free Allstars
- School of Rock

Saturday, October 4:

- Eminem
- Skrillex
- Lana Del Rey
- Major Lazer
- The Avett Brothers
- The Head and the Heart
- Interpol
- Broken Bells
- Juanes
- Iggy Azalea
- Rebelution
- Icona Pop
- Beats Antique
- Tune-Yards
- Trombone Shorty & Orleans Avenue
- Mac Demarco
- Polica
- Lucius
- Zoé
- Falls
- Tor Miller
- My Brightest Diamond
- The Rosebuds
- The Chain Gang of 1974
- Spanish Gold
- Empires
- Benjamin Booker
- Rey Pila
- Snowmine
- The Wans
- The Hunts
- Blue Bear
- Mike and the Moonpies
- Wild Moccasins
- Nightbox
- The Levites
- Wesley Bray and the Disciples of Joy
- Steve Songs
- Ralph's World
- Sugar Free Allstars
- School of Rock

Sunday, October 5:

- Pearl Jam
- Calvin Harris
- The Replacements
- Zedd
- Spoon
- Chromeo
- Phantogram
- Fitz & The Tantrums
- the Gaslight Anthem
- AFI
- Turnpike Troubadours
- Jenny Lewis
- Kongos
- Real Estate
- Gramatik
- Lettuce
- Imelda May
- Jhene Aiko
- MØ
- Vic Mensa
- Jamestown Revival
- Reuben and The Dark
- A Thousand Horses
- Nikki Lane
- Cults
- Haerts
- Miniature Tigers
- The Districts
- Nostalghia
- The Last Internationale
- Modoc
- Dawn and Hawkes
- Hard Proof
- The Legendary Soul Stirrers
- River City Christianettes
- Gospel Silvertones
- Steve Songs
- Elizabeth McQueen
- The Q Brothers
- Peter Distefano & Tor
- Rey Pila

=== Weekend 2 ===
Weekend 2 Lineup (2014)

Friday, October 10:

- Outkast
- Beck
- Foster The People
- Belle & Sebastian
- Childish Gambino
- Chvrches
- Jimmy Cliff
- St. Vincent
- The Glitch Mob
- Capital Cities
- Paolo Nutini
- Sam Smith
- Blackberry Smoke
- Lake Street Dive
- Temples
- Ozomatli
- Bleachers
- Ana Tijoux
- J. Roddy Walston & The Business
- Robert Ellis
- Saints of Valory
- Jon Batiste and Stay Human
- The Preatures
- Night Terrors of 1927
- Young & Sick
- James Bay
- Blank Range
- Ray Benson & Milkdrive
- Future Unlimited
- The Lonely Biscuits
- Catfish and the Bottlemen
- Black Pistol Fire
- Penny & Sparrow
- The Jones Family Singers
- Shields of Faith
- The Barton Hills Choir w/ Special Guest Stuart Murdoch
- Ralph's World
- Elizabeth McQueen
- Sugar Free Allstars
- School of Rock
- Broods

Saturday, October 11:

- Eminem
- Skrillex
- Lana Del Rey
- Major Lazer
- The Avett Brothers
- The Head and the Heart
- Interpol
- Broken Bells
- Juanes
- Iggy Azalea
- Rebelution
- Icona Pop
- Beats Antique
- Tune-Yards
- Trombone Shorty & Orleans Avenue
- Mac Demarco
- Polica
- Lucius
- Zoé
- Falls
- Tor Miller
- My Brightest Diamond
- The Rosebuds
- The Chain Gang of 1974
- Spanish Gold
- Empires
- Benjamin Booker
- Rey Pila
- Beat Connection
- Bully
- Von Grey
- The Nightowls
- Riders Against the Storm
- Knifight
- The Levites
- Ashley Cleveland
- Wesley Bray and the Disciples of Joy
- Steve Songs
- Ralph's World
- Sugar Free Allstars
- Elizabeth McQueen

Sunday, October 12:

- Pearl Jam
- Calvin Harris
- Lorde
- The Replacements
- Zedd
- Spoon
- Chromeo
- Phantogram
- Fitz and the Tantrums
- The Gaslight Anthem
- AFI
- Turnpike Troubadours
- Jenny Lewis
- Kongos
- Real Estate
- Gramatik
- Lettuce
- Imelda May
- MØ
- Parker Millsap
- Reuben and the Dark
- A Thousand Horses
- Nikki Lane
- Cults
- Haerts
- Miniature Tigers
- Taylor Bennett
- The Districts
- Nostalghia
- Melanie Martinez
- Johnnyswim
- Colony House
- Wood & Wire
- Emily Wolfe
- The Legendary Soul Stirrers
- The Stapletones
- The River City Christianettes
- Steve Songs
- School of Rock
- The Q Brothers
- Peter Distefano & Tor
- Knox Hamilton

== 2015 ==
Austin City Limits Music Festival was held over two weekends: October 2–4 and October 9–11, 2015. The headliners were Foo Fighters, Drake, the Strokes, Florence and the Machine, and the Weeknd.

=== Weekend 1 ===
Weekend 1 Lineup (2015)

Friday, October 2:

- Foo Fighters
- Disclosure
- Tame Impala
- Gary Clark Jr.
- Brand New
- Billy Idol
- Brandon Flowers
- George Ezra
- Flosstradamus
- Cherub
- Run the Jewels
- Leon Bridges
- Nate Ruess
- Royal Blood
- Rhiannon Giddens
- Albert Hammond Jr.
- Moon Taxi
- Drew Holcomb and the Neighbors
- Meg Myers
- The Maccabees
- Son Little
- Ruen Brothers
- Asleep at the Wheel
- Alina Baraz
- Con Brio
- Talk in Tongues
- Leopold and His Fiction
- Sons of Bill
- Jessica Hernandez & the Deltas
- American Aquarium
- Calliope Musicals
- In the Whale
- Maggie Koerner
- The Levites
- Blessed
- The Barton Hills Choir
- Residual Kid
- Justin Roberts & the Not Ready for Naptime Players
- Tim Kubart with Mother Falcon
- School of Rock

Saturday, October 3:

- Drake
- deadmau5
- Bassnectar
- Alabama Shakes
- Sturgill Simpson
- ASAP Rocky
- TV on the Radio
- G-Eazy
- Walk the Moon
- Twenty One Pilots
- Father John Misty
- Glass Animals
- Shakey Graves
- Echosmith
- MisterWives
- José González
- Houndmouth
- Boots
- Unknown Mortal Orchestra
- Vince Staples
- Ryn Weaver
- In the Valley Below
- Milo Greene
- San Fermin
- Luis Coronel
- William Clark Green
- Charlotte OC
- Waters
- Rayland Baxter
- The Wind and the Wave
- Sol Cat
- The Last Bandoleros
- Koa
- Mikaela Davis
- Tyree Morris & Hearts of Worship
- A Tribute to Andrae Crouch
- Wesley Bray and the Disciples of Joy
- Q Brothers
- Residual Kid
- Tim Kubart with Mother Falcon
- Big Don

Sunday, October 4:

- The Strokes
- The Weeknd
- Alt-J
- Hozier
- Of Monsters and Men
- The Decemberists
- Chance the Rapper
- Ben Howard
- Nero
- Dwight Yoakam
- Vance Joy
- Lord Huron
- Sylvan Esso
- Kurt Vile and the Violators
- GRiZ
- Daughter
- Børns
- Strand of Oaks
- Halsey
- Classixx
- Years & Years
- Jidenna
- Sheppard
- Waxahatchee
- Amason
- Ume
- Lion Babe
- The Suffers
- Kehlani
- Kali Uchis
- Night Drive
- Boom Forest
- The Eagle Rock Gospel Singers
- Muddy Magnolias
- Hunter Sharpe
- Disciples of Christ
- Kings of Harmony +1
- Q Brothers
- Justin Roberts & the Not Ready for Naptime Players
- Big Don
- School of Rock

=== Weekend 2 ===
Weekend 2 Lineup (2015)

Friday, October 9:

- Foo Fighters
- Disclosure
- Tame Impala
- Gary Clark Jr.
- Brand New
- Billy Idol
- George Ezra
- Flosstradamus
- Cherub
- Future
- Run the Jewels
- Leon Bridges
- Nate Ruess
- Royal Blood
- Rhiannon Giddens
- Albert Hammond Jr.
- Moon Taxi
- Meg Myers
- The Maccabees
- Ruen Brothers
- Wolf Alice
- Avers
- Asleep at the Wheel
- Songhoy Blues
- Alina Baraz
- Whiskey Myers
- Con Brio
- The Nightowls
- Tameca Jones
- The London Souls
- DeRobert & the Half-Truths
- Kansas Bible Company
- The Marcus King Band
- The Levites
- Blessed
- The Barton Hills Choir
- Q Brothers
- EmiSunshine
- Mister G
- Big Don

Saturday, October 10:

- Drake
- deadmau5
- Bassnectar
- Modest Mouse
- Sturgill Simpson
- ASAP Rocky
- TV on the Radio
- G-Eazy
- Walk the Moon
- Twenty One Pilots
- Father John Misty
- Glass Animals
- Shakey Graves
- Echosmith
- MisterWives
- José González
- Houndmouth
- Boots
- Unknown Mortal Orchestra
- Vince Staples
- Ryn Weaver
- Fidlar
- Milo Greene
- San Fermin
- Luis Coronel
- Charlotte OC
- Holychild
- Bee Caves
- Alessia Cara
- Riders Against the Storm
- Gabriel Garzón-Montano
- Adia Victoria
- Sounds Del Mar
- Sugar + the Hi-Lows
- Tyree Morris & Hearts of Worship
- A Tribute to Andrae Crouch
- Wesley Bray and the Disciples of Joy
- EmiSunshine
- The Pop Ups
- Mister G
- School of Rock

Sunday, October 11:

- Florence + the Machine
- The Weeknd
- alt-J
- Hozier
- Of Monsters and Men
- The Decemberists
- Chance the Rapper
- Ben Howard
- Nero
- Dwight Yoakam
- Vance Joy
- Lord Huron
- Sylvan Esso
- Kurt Vile and the Violators
- GRiZ
- Daughter
- BØRNS
- Strand of Oaks
- Halsey
- Classixx
- Jidenna
- Sheppard
- Amason
- Lion Babe
- Marian Hill
- Kaleo
- The Hunts
- Beat Connection
- Mandolin Orange
- Spirit Family Reunion
- Kali Uchis
- Knifight
- The Eagle Rock Gospel Singers
- Lanz Pierce
- Steelism
- Disciples of Christ
- Kings of Harmony +1
- Q Brothers
- Motown Pete
- The Pop Ups
- School of Rock

== 2016 ==
Austin City Limits Music Festival was held over two weekends: September 30 – October 2 and October 7–9, 2016. The headliners were Radiohead, Kygo, Kendrick Lamar, Mumford & Sons, and LCD Soundsystem.

=== Weekend 1 ===
Weekend 1 Lineup (2016)

Friday, September 30:

- Radiohead
- Major Lazer
- Flume
- M83
- Band of Horses
- Foals
- Die Antwoord
- Cold War Kids
- Blue October
- Tory Lanez
- Flying Lotus
- Banks & Steelz
- Corinne Bailey Rae
- St. Lucia
- Flight Facilities
- The Front Bottoms
- Frightened Rabbit
- The Strumbellas
- Chairlift
- Raury
- Eliot Sumner
- Jess Glynne
- Nao
- Bombino
- Lizzo
- Asleep at the Wheel
- Maren Morris
- Bayonne
- Julien Baker
- Los Coast
- Vhs Collection
- Welshly Arms
- Liza Anne
- Gospel Silvertones

Saturday, October 1:

- Kendrick Lamar
- Kygo
- The Chainsmokers
- Cage the Elephant
- Schoolboy Q
- Two Door Cinema Club
- LL Cool J feat. DJ Z-Trip
- City and Colour
- Andrew Bird
- Catfish and the Bottlemen
- The Naked and Famous
- Dj Mustard
- Melanie Martinez
- Jack Garratt
- Saint Motel
- Wild Child
- Andra Day
- Gallant
- Caveman
- Bomba Estéreo
- Alunageorge
- Nothing but Thieves
- Lewis Del Mar
- Honne
- Kamaiyah
- Jazz Cartier
- Israel Nash
- Gina Chavez
- Nawas
- Lucy Dacus
- Luisa Maita
- Matt the Electrician
- Aubrie Sellers
- New Madrid
- The Gills
- Endurance

Sunday, October 2:

- Mumford & Sons
- LCD Soundsystem
- Chris Stapleton
- Haim
- Young The Giant
- Local Natives
- Nathaniel Rateliff & the Night Sweats
- Miike Snow
- Kacey Musgraves
- St. Paul and the Broken Bones
- Bob Moses
- Margo Price
- Oh Wonder
- Brett Dennen
- Pete Yorn
- Break Science
- Gregory Porter
- Chronixx & Zincfence Redemption
- Wild Belle
- Nf
- Domo Genesis
- Marlon Williams
- The Shelters
- Hælos
- The James Hunter Six
- Shane Smith & the Saints
- Prinze George
- July Talk
- Sister Sparrow & the Dirty Birds
- Basia Bulat
- Jai Malano
- Avery Sunshine
- Luke Winslow-king
- The Spiritualettes

=== Weekend 2 ===
Weekend 2 Lineup (2016)

Friday, October 7:

- Radiohead
- Major Lazer
- Flume
- M83
- Band of Horses
- Foals
- Die Antwoord
- Cold War Kids
- Awolnation
- Tory Lanez
- Flying Lotus
- Banks & Steelz
- Corinne Bailey Rae
- Flight Facilities
- The Front Bottoms
- The Strumbellas
- Chairlift
- Raury
- The Struts
- Bad Suns
- The Wombats
- Bear Hands
- Grace Mitchell
- Kevin Devine & the Goddamn Band
- Nao
- Bombino
- Lizzo
- Foy Vance
- Asleep at the Wheel
- Lincoln Durham
- Keeper
- Susto
- Daniel Ellsworth & the Great Lakes
- LANco
- The Stapletones

Saturday, October 8:

- Kendrick Lamar
- Kygo
- The Chainsmokers
- Cage the Elephant
- Schoolboy Q
- Two Door Cinema Club
- LL Cool J feat. DJ Z-Trip
- City and Colour
- Catfish and the Bottlemen
- The Naked and Famous
- Anderson .Paak & the Free Nationals
- DJ Mustard
- Melanie Martinez
- Conor Oberst
- Jack Garratt
- Saint Motel
- Andra Day
- Gallant
- Caveman
- Bomba Estéreo
- JR JR
- Nothing but Thieves
- Joey Purp
- Walker Lukens & the Side Arms
- Gina Chavez
- Nawas
- Luisa Maita
- The Roosevelts
- Blue Healer
- Slaves
- Margaret Glaspy
- Tennyson
- Khruangbin
- Shawn Pander
- The River City Christianettes

Sunday, October 9:

- Mumford & Sons
- LCD Soundsystem
- Willie Nelson
- Haim
- Young the Giant
- Local Natives
- Nathaniel Rateliff & the Night Sweats
- Miike Snow
- St. Paul and the Broken Bones
- Atlas Genius
- Bob Moses
- Ra Ra Riot
- Margo Price
- Oh Wonder
- Crystal Fighters
- Brett Dennen
- Pete Yorn
- Break Science
- Gregory Porter
- Wild Belle
- NF
- Anderson East
- Domo Genesis
- Marlon Williams
- Hælos
- The James Hunter Six
- July Talk
- Magna Carda
- Charlie Belle
- Avery Sunshine
- Amasa Hines
- Pearl Charles
- Amanda Shires
- Elise Davis
- Wesley Bray and the Disciples of Joy

== 2017 ==
Austin City Limits Music Festival was held over two weekends: October 6–8 and October 13–15, 2017. The lineup featured headliners Jay Z, Red Hot Chili Peppers, Chance the Rapper, The Killers, and Gorillaz. This was the year that Silent Disco produced by Quiet Events began.

=== Weekend 1 ===
Weekend 1 Lineup (2017)

Friday, October 6:

- Jay-Z
- Martin Garrix
- The xx
- Ryan Adams
- Solange
- Foster the People
- (Sandy) Alex G
- Andrew McMahon in the Wilderness
- Asleep at the Wheel (wknd. 1 only)
- Big Wild
- Bonobo
- Carson McHone (wknd. 1 only)
- Crystal Castles
- Devin Dawson (wknd. 1 only)
- Disciples of Christ (wknd. 1 only)
- Hamilton Leithauser
- Jonny P (wknd. 1 only)
- La Femme (wknd. 1 only)
- Lori Henriques (wknd. 1 only)
- Lukas Nelson & Promise of the Real
- Methyl Ethel (wknd. 1 only)
- Missio (wknd. 1)
- Mutemath (wknd. 1 only)
- Royal Blood (wknd. 1 only)
- School of Rock
- Sigrid (wknd. 1 only)
- Skepta
- Spencer Ludwig (wknd. 1 only)
- The Barton Hills Choir (wknd. 1)
- The Band of Heathens
- The Lemon Twigs
- The Revivalists
- The Wild Now (wknd. 1 only)
- Twin Limber (wknd. 1 only)
- Valerie June
- Vulfpeck
- Welles

Saturday, October 7:

- Red Hot Chili Peppers
- Chance the Rapper
- Ice Cube
- Spoon
- Tove Lo
- A$AP Ferg
- Alison Wonderland (wknd. 1 only)
- Allan Rayman
- Angel Olsen
- Ásgeir (wknd. 1 only)
- Benjamin Booker
- Billy Raffoul (wknd. 2)
- Capyac (wknd. 1 only)
- Car Seat Headrest
- Cody Jinks
- Cut Copy (wknd. 1 only)
- Dreamcar
- Grace Vanderwaal
- Joseph (wknd. 1 only)
- LIVE
- Lori Henriques (wknd. 1 only)
- Luke Combs (wknd. 1 only)
- Mobley (wknd. 1 only)
- Mondo Cozmo
- Muna (wknd. 1)
- Ought
- Parker Millsap
- Pastor Cedrid B. West & The Electrifying Relatives (wknd. 1 only)
- Pumarosa
- R.LUM.R (wknd. 1 only)
- Rattletree (wknd. 1 only)
- Russ
- Rüfüs Du Sol
- Sleepy Man (wknd. 1)
- The Black Angels
- Thundercat (wknd. 1 only)
- Xavier Ömar

Sunday, October 8:

- The Killers
- Gorillaz
- Run the Jewels
- The Head and the Heart
- Vance Joy
- Zhu
- AJR (wknd. 1 only)
- Amy Shark
- BADBADNOTGOOD
- Bibi Bourelly
- Billy Raffoul (wknd. 1)
- Brothers Osborne
- Caitlyn Smith (wknd. 1 only)
- Charlotte Cardin (wknd. 1 only)
- Danny Brown
- Deap Vally
- Devon Gillfillian (wknd. 1 only)
- DRAM
- First Aid Kit
- Jacob Banks (wknd. 1 only)
- Jamila Woods
- Q Brothers
- SuperDuperKyle (wknd. 1 only)
- Louis the Child
- Mélat (wknd. 1 only)
- Middle Kids
- Milky Chance
- Portugal. The Man
- Raging Fyah
- Rainbow Kitten Surprise
- Sam Dew
- School of Rock
- Skip Marley
- Sleepy Man
- Tank and the Bangas
- The Growlers
- The Lands Band (wknd. 1 only)
- Whitney

=== Weekend 2 ===
Weekend 2 Lineup (2017)

Friday, October 13:

- Jay-Z
- Martin Garrix
- The xx
- Ryan Adams
- Solange
- Foster the People
- (Sandy) Alex G
- Andrew McMahon in the Wilderness
- Annabelle Chairlegs (wknd. 2 only)
- Big Wild
- Bonobo
- Coin (wknd. 2 only)
- Crystal Castles
- Dale and Ray (wknd. 2 only)
- Eagles of Death Metal (wknd. 2 only)
- Hamilton Leithauser
- James Vincent McMorrow
- Liz Cooper & The Stampede (wknd. 2 only)
- Lukas Nelson & Promise of the Real
- Muna (wknd. 2)
- Nightly (wknd. 2 only)
- O.A.R. (wknd. 2 only)
- Pointed Man Band (wknd. 2 only)
- Ron Gallo (wknd. 2 only)
- School of Rock
- Shields of Faith (wknd. 2 only)
- Skepta
- Ten Fé (wknd. 2 only)
- The Band of Heathens
- The Bishop (wknd. 2 only)
- The Lemon Twigs
- The Okee Dokee Brothers (wknd. 2 only)
- The Revivalists
- Two Feet (wknd. 2 only)
- Twelve 'Len (wknd. 2 only)
- Valerie June
- Vulfpeck
- Welles

Saturday, October 14:

- Red Hot Chili Peppers
- Chance the Rapper
- Ice Cube
- Spoon
- Tove Lo
- A$AP Ferg
- Allan Rayman
- Angel Olsen
- Bells of Joy (wknd. 2 only)
- Benjamin Booker
- Billy Raffoul (wknd. 2)
- Blackfoot Gypsies (wknd 2 only)
- Car Seat Headrest
- Cody Jinks
- Dreamers (wknd. 2 only)
- Dreamcar
- Getter (wknd. 2 only)
- Glass Animals (wknd. 2 only)
- Grace Vanderwaal
- Karen Elson (wknd. 2 only)
- Kupira Marimba (wknd. 2 only)
- LIVE
- Missio (wknd. 2)
- Mondo Cozmo
- Nick Hakim (wknd. 2 only)
- Ought
- Parker Millsap
- Paul Cauthen (wknd. 2 only)
- Pointed Man Band (wknd. 2 only)
- Russ
- Rüfüs Du Sol
- Striking Matches (wknd. 2 only)
- Tash Sultana (wknd. 2 only)
- The Barton Hills Choir (wknd. 2)
- The Black Angels
- Tomar and the FCS (wknd. 2 only)
- Xavier Ömar

Sunday, October 15:

- The Killers
- Gorillaz
- Run the Jewels
- The Head and the Heart
- Vance Joy
- Zhu
- Amy Shark
- BADBADNOTGOOD
- Bibi Bourelly
- Broods (wknd. 2 only)
- Brothers Osborne
- Danny Brown
- Day Wave (wknd. 2 only)
- Deap Vally
- DRAM
- First Aid Kit
- Q Brothers
- Kings of Harmony +1 (wknd. 2 only)
- Louis the Child
- Middle Kids
- Midland (wknd. 2)
- Milky Chance
- Okey Dokey (wknd. 2 only)
- Pell (wknd. 2 only)
- Portugal. The Man
- Raging Fyah
- Rainbow Kitten Surprise
- Sam Dew
- School of Rock
- Skip Marley
- Sleepy Man
- Songhoy Blues (wknd. 2 only)
- Tank and the Bangas
- The Growlers
- Tucker Beathard (wknd. 2 only)
- White Reaper (wknd. 2 only)
- Whitney

== 2018 ==
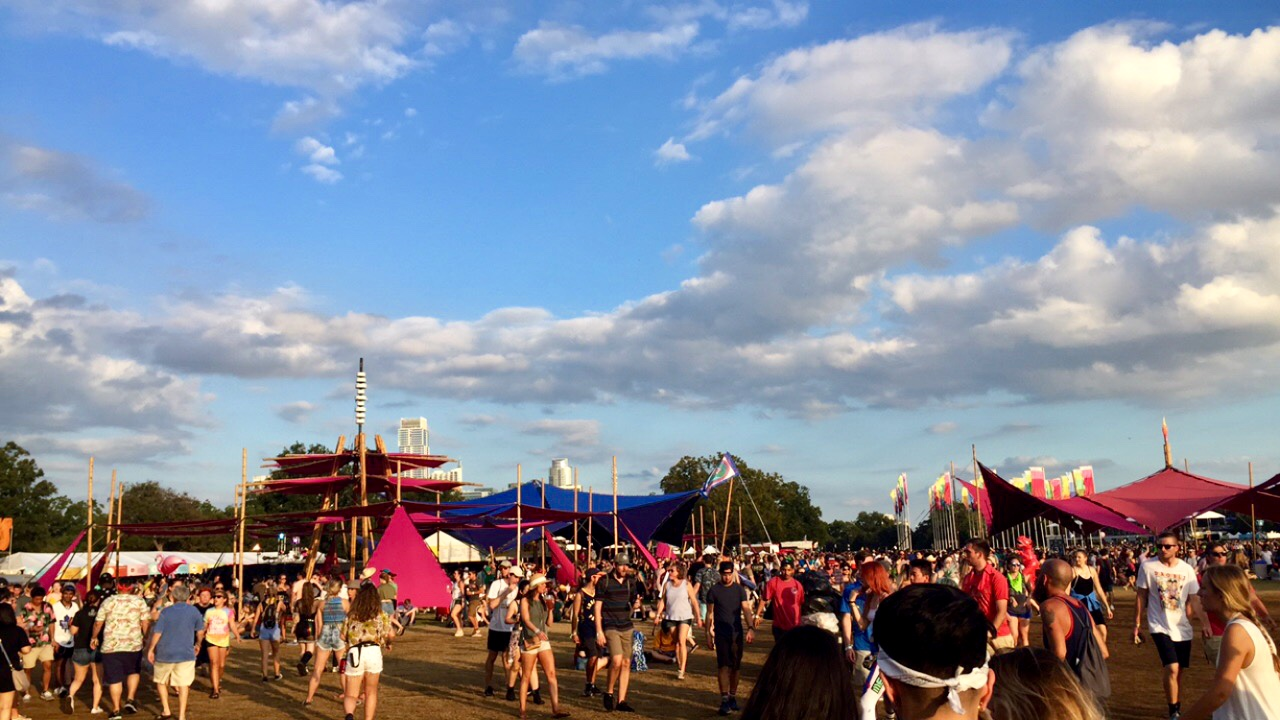
Austin City Limits Music Festival, weekend 2 in 2018.

Austin City Limits Music Festival was held over two weekends: October 5–7 and October 12–14, 2018. The lineup featured headliners Paul McCartney, Metallica, Arctic Monkeys, Travis Scott, Odesza, and The National. Childish Gambino was forced to cancel his performance after a foot injury, and Justice was promoted from an earlier time slot to replace him as a headliner. Phoenix and Lil Wayne were also added to fill the empty time slots, with the former playing on the first weekend of the festival and the latter on the second weekend.

=== Weekend 1 ===
Weekend 1 Lineup (2018)

Friday, October 5:

- Paul McCartney
- ODESZA
- The National
- Khalid
- Hozier
- David Byrne
- Father John Misty
- Brockhampton
- BØRNS
- Alvvays
- Asleep at the Wheel
- Ben Kweller
- Big Thief
- Bishop Briggs
- Cuco
- Fatai
- Fickle Friends
- Gang of Youths
- Golden Dawn Arkestra
- Greta Van Fleet
- Gryffin
- Jungle
- Lovelytheband
- Manchester Orchestra
- Mikky Ekko
- NÄM
- Natalie Prass
- Noname
- Ravyn Lenae
- Red Yarn
- RF Shannon
- School of Rock
- Sir Sly
- The Barton Hills Choir
- The Coronas
- The Weather Station
- Topaz Jones
- Wesley Bray & The Disciples of Joy

Saturday, October 6:

- Metallica
- Justice
- CHVRCHES
- St. Vincent
- Brandi Carlile
- Nelly
- Alice Merton
- Bazzi
- Bells of Joy
- Blood Orange
- Curtis Harding
- Deftones
- Dizzy
- Durand Jones & The Indications
- flor
- Highly Suspect
- IAMDDB
- Ikebe Shakedown
- Jackie Venson
- Japanese Breakfast
- Kupira Marimba
- Molly Burch
- Mon Laferte
- Naked Giants
- PARIS
- Residente
- San Holo
- SaulPaul
- Sharon Van Etten
- slenderbodies
- Smino
- Sofi Tukker
- Supa Bwe
- Sweet Spirit
- The Breeders
- The Wombats
- VÉRITÉ

Sunday, October 7:

- Travis Scott
- Arctic Monkeys
- Phoenix
- Janelle Monáe
- A R I Z O N A
- Amber Mark
- Amen Dunes
- Bahamas
- Camila Cabello
- Elle King
- Flor de Toloache
- Hailey Knox
- Houndmouth
- Illenium
- Injury Reserve
- Q Brothers
- Khruangbin
- Lemaitre
- Lisa Loeb
- Mt Joy
- Neighbor Lady
- Parquet Courts
- REZZ
- Sailor Poon
- School of Rock
- Shakey Graves
- Shame
- Sylvan Esso
- The Ghost of Paul Revere
- The Nude Party
- The Relatives
- The Revolution
- The Texas Gentlemen
- Tinashe
- Twin Shadow
- Wilderado
- X Ambassadors
- Yungblud

=== Weekend 2 ===
Weekend 2 Lineup (2018)

Friday, October 12:

- Paul McCartney
- ODESZA
- The National
- Khalid
- Hozier
- David Byrne
- Father John Misty
- Brockhampton
- Lily Allen
- Alice Merton
- Alvvays
- Arkells
- Ben Kweller
- Big Thief
- Bishop Briggs
- Duncan Fellows
- Fatai
- Golden Dawn Arkestra
- Gryffin
- Jungle
- Lard Dog & The Band of Shy
- Magic City Hippies
- Manchester Orchestra
- Natalie Prass
- Nicole Atkins
- Noname
- Ralph's World
- Ravyn Lenae
- Reignwolf
- School of Rock
- Sir Sly
- The Blancos
- Curtis Roush
- The Coronas
- The Gospel Stars

Saturday, October 13:

- Metallica
- Justice
- CHVRCHES
- Lil Wayne
- Disturbed
- Brandi Carlile
- Bazzi
- Charley Crockett
- Curtis Harding
- Blood Orange
- Donna Missal
- Durand Jones & The Indications
- Harry Paradise
- IAMDDB
- Ikebe Shakedown
- Japanese Breakfast
- Lard Dog & The Band of Joy
- Lo Moon
- Lucie Silvas
- Mamafesta
- Marian Hill
- Mon Laferte
- Ralph's World
- Residente
- Rhye
- Ruston Kelly
- San Holo
- Smino
- Sylvan Esso
- The Barton Hills Choir
- The Breeders
- The Wombats
- Trampled by Turtles
- TY Morris & H.O.W.
- VÉRITÉ
- Wallows
- slenderbodies

Sunday, October 14:

- Travis Scott
- Arctic Monkeys
- Shawn Mendes
- St. Vincent
- Janelle Monáe
- A R I Z O N A
- Amber Mark
- Amen Dunes
- B.A.G. (Blimes x Gifted Gab)
- Bahamas
- DAVIE
- Elle King
- Flor de Toloache
- Houndmouth
- Illenium
- Q Brothers
- Kydd Jones
- Lemaitre
- Parquet Courts
- Phil Cook
- REZZ
- SaulPaul
- School of Rock
- Shakey Graves
- Superfónicos
- The Ghost of Paul Revere
- The Revolution
- The Spiritualettes
- Thunderpussy
- Tinashe
- Twin Shadow
- Vince Staples
- X Ambassadors
- Yungblud

== 2019 ==
2019 Austin City Limits Music Festival was held over two weekends: October 4–6 and 11–13. The festival was headlined by Guns N' Roses, Mumford & Sons, Childish Gambino, The Cure, Cardi B (first weekend only), Billie Eilish, Tame Impala, and Robyn (second weekend only).

=== Weekend 1 ===
Weekend 1 Lineup (2019)

Friday, October 4:

- Guns N' Roses
- Tame Impala
- The Raconteurs
- Thom Yorke's Tomorrow's Modern Boxes
- Jenny Lewis
- Alesia Lani
- Asleep at the Wheel
- Black Pistol Fire
- Cherry Glazerr
- Erin Rae
- Fidlar
- Houses
- Jai Wolf
- Kaytranada
- Kim Viera
- King Princess
- K.Flay
- Ladi Earth
- Monsieur Periné
- Oliver Tree
- Palm Springsteen
- RL Grime
- Scarypoolparty
- The Amazons
- The Comet Is Coming
- TroyBoi
- Tyler Childers
- Weyes Blood

Saturday, October 5:

- The Cure
- Childish Gambino
- Billie Eilish
- James Blake
- Gary Clark Jr.
- Metric
- Bayonne
- Bones UK
- Briston Maroney
- Disciples of Christ
- Finneas
- Flora Cash
- Hippie Sabotage
- Ingrid Andress
- Judah & the Lion
- Kali Uchis
- Lauren Daigle
- Madison Ryann Ward
- Masego
- Men I Trust
- MisterWives
- Natalia Lafourcade
- Night Cap
- Patrick Droney
- Pink Sweats
- Rob Baird
- Sigrid
- Stone Wheels
- Superet
- Taylor Bennett
- The Aquadolls
- Tierra Whack
- 21 Savage
- Brittany Howard

Sunday, October 6:

- Mumford & Sons
- Cardi B
- Lizzo
- Kacey Musgraves
- Banks
- Bea Miller
- Billy Strings
- Bruce Hornsby & The Noisemakers
- Caamp
- Cleopatrick
- Delacey
- Diaconos
- Duckwrth
- Faye Webster
- Fisher
- GoGo Penguin
- GRiZ
- Idles
- Joseph
- Julia Jacklin
- KAINA
- Kevin Garrett
- LANY
- Nilüfer Yanya
- Koffee
- Otis the Destroyer
- Rebelution
- Rosalía
- Shields of Faith
- Shura
- Still Woozy
- Taela
- The Gospel Silvertones
- The Japanese House
- Third Eye Blind
- Thomas Csorba
- TOBi

=== Weekend 2 ===
Weekend 2 Lineup (2019)

Friday, October 11:

- Guns N' Roses
- Tame Impala
- The Raconteurs
- Thom Yorke's Tomorrow's Modern Boxes
- Jenny Lewis
- Black Pistol Fire
- Cherry Glazerr
- Friday Pilots Club
- Houses
- Jai Wolf
- Jane Ellen Bryant
- Kaytranada
- King Princess
- K.Flay
- Flamingosis
- Madison Beer
- Mahalia
- Monsieur Periné
- Pike & Sutton
- RL Grime
- Savannah Conley
- The Aces
- The Band Camino
- The Beaches
- The Comet Is Coming
- The Score
- TroyBoi
- Tyler Childers

Saturday, October 12:

- The Cure
- Childish Gambino
- Billie Eilish
- James Blake
- Gary Clark Jr.
- Metric
- Megan Thee Stallion
- Abhi the Nomad
- Blackillac
- Briston Maroney
- Chris Shiflett
- Denzel Curry
- Diamante Eléctrico
- Dylan LeBlanc
- Flora Cash
- Hippie Sabotage
- Judah & the Lion
- Kali Uchis
- Lauren Daigle
- Laundry Day
- Madison Ryann Ward
- Masego
- Natalia Lafourcade
- Orville Peck
- Pink Sweats
- Sigrid
- Dayglow
- Taylor Bennett
- The Aquadolls
- Tierra Whack
- Vanessa Zamora
- Welsey Bray & the Disciples of Joy
- 21 Savage
- Brittany Howard

Sunday, October 13:

- Mumford & Sons
- Robyn
- Lizzo
- Kacey Musgraves
- Banks
- Bea Miller
- Bruce Hornsby & The Noisemakers
- Caamp
- Caroline Rose
- Drew Holcomb and the Neighbors
- Duckwrth
- Fisher
- GoGo Penguin
- GRiZ
- Idles
- IDK
- Joseph
- Julia Jacklin
- Kady Rain
- Kat Dahlia
- LANY
- Ley Line
- Mallrat
- Koffee
- PNTHN
- Rebelution
- Rosalía
- Sego
- Shandon Sahm
- Shura
- Still Woozy
- The Gospel Stars
- Third Eye Blind
- Wrabel
- Yola

== 2020 ==
2020 Austin City Limits Music Festival was held virtually due to the COVID-19 pandemic in Austin, Texas. The festival was held on October 9–11 and streamed previous festivals as well as live performances.

2020 Virtual Festival Lineup

Friday

- Billie Eilish (2019)
- Twenty One Pilots (2015)
- Willie Nelson (2016)
- Nathaniel Rateliff & the Night Sweats (2016)
- Spoon (2017)
- Paul Cauthen
- Mélat
- Durand Jones & The Indications (2018)

Saturday

- Queens of the Stone Age (2013)
- Radiohead (2016)
- LCD Soundsystem (2010)
- St. Vincent (2018)
- Juanes (2014)
- Black Pumas
- Otis the Destroyer
- Phoenix (2018)
- Zhu (2017)
- Sylvan Esso (2018)

Sunday

- Phish (2010)
- My Morning Jacket (2011)
- The xx (2017)
- Paul McCartney (2018)
- Gary Clark Jr. (2019)
- Jackie Venson
- Mobley
- Los Coast
- The String Cheese Incident (2003)
- Alabama Shakes (2015)

== 2021 ==
2021 Austin City Limits Music Festival was held over two weekends: October 1–3 and 8–10. The headliners were George Strait, Billie Eilish, Tyler, the Creator, Miley Cyrus, Rüfüs Du Sol, and Duran Duran.

=== Weekend 1 ===
Weekend 1 Lineup (2021)

Friday, October 1:

- Miley Cyrus
- George Strait
- Machine Gun Kelly
- Megan Thee Stallion
- Black Pumas
- Zhu
- Finneas
- Dermot Kennedy
- Jon Pardi
- Bexley
- Carolesdaughter
- Chet Faker
- Disko Cowboy
- Emotional Oranges
- Joy Oladokun
- Moses Sumney
- Skip Marley
- The Backseat Lovers
- Tkay Maidza
- Zella Day

Saturday, October 2:

- Billie Eilish
- Rüfüs Du Sol
- Doja Cat
- Modest Mouse
- Phoebe Bridgers
- Jack Harlow
- Alison Wonderland
- Dayglow
- AG Club
- Aaron Stephens
- Amber Mark
- Arizona Zervas
- Arlie
- Charley Crockett
- Frances Forever
- Freddie Gibbs
- Future Islands
- Gina Chavez
- Girl in Red
- Gracie Abrams
- Katie Pruitt
- La Doña
- Lunay
- Missio
- Mob Rich
- Moziah
- Payday
- Remi Wolf
- Sir Woman
- Skyler Day
- Sun Room
- Surfaces
- The Hu
- The Mighty Sincere Voices
- Yendry

Sunday, October 3:

- Tyler, the Creator
- Duran Duran
- Greta Van Fleet
- Erykah Badu
- St. Vincent
- Karol G
- Band of Horses
- Lane 8
- Marc Rebillet
- Tierra Whack
- 070 Shake
- AugustPonthier
- Calder Allen
- Cam
- Cautious Clay
- Channel Tres
- Chris Lake
- Claud
- Deezie Brown
- Hardy
- Jany Green
- Jessie Murph
- KennyHoopla
- Mother Mother
- Noga Erez
- Polo G
- Public Library Commute
- Shields of Faith
- Shooks
- Sofía Valdés
- Tate McRae
- TC Superstar
- Tenille Arts
- Toosii
- White Reaper

=== Weekend 2 ===
Weekend 2 Lineup (2021)

Friday, October 8:

- Miley Cyrus
- George Strait
- Machine Gun Kelly
- Megan Thee Stallion
- Black Pumas
- Bleachers
- Lane 8
- Finneas
- Dermot Kennedy
- Jon Pardi
- LeAnn Rimes
- Claud
- Daydream Masi
- Disko Cowboy
- Durand Jones & The Indications
- Erykah Badu (moved from Sunday)
- Heartless Bastards
- Hinds
- Jxdn
- Leah Blevins
- Maggie Rose
- Moses Sumney
- OMB Peezy
- Q
- Riders Against the Storm
- Saleka
- Skip Marley
- The Teeta
- Vincent Neil Emerson

Saturday, October 9:

- Billie Eilish
- Rüfüs Du Sol
- Doja Cat
- Modest Mouse
- Phoebe Bridgers
- Jack Harlow
- Alison Wonderland
- Dayglow
- 070 Shake
- Aaron Frazer
- AG Club
- Arizona Zervas
- Arlie
- Charley Crockett
- Disciples of Christ
- Frances Forever
- Freddie Gibbs
- Future Islands
- Gigi
- Girl in Red
- Gracie Abrams
- Holly Humberstone
- Jade Bird
- La Doña
- Leyla Blue
- LP Giobbi
- Mike Melinoe
- Missio
- Raiche
- Remi Wolf
- Samantha Sanchez
- Surfaces
- The Hu
- The Tender Things
- White Reaper
- WiztheMC

Sunday, October 10:

- Tyler, the Creator
- Duran Duran
- Greta Van Fleet
- Madeon (Erykah Badu moved to Friday)
- Jon Batiste
- Karol G
- Band of Horses
- Marc Rebillet
- Tierra Whack
- Amber Mark
- Ant Clemons
- Blk Odyssy
- Calder Allen
- Cam
- Cautious Clay
- Channel Tres
- Chris Lake
- David Ramirez
- Jessie Murph
- KennyHoopla
- Lunay
- Mattiel
- Nané
- Noga Erez
- Payday
- Polo G
- Serena Isioma
- Shiela
- Superfónicos
- Tate McRae
- Toosii
- Trixie Mattel
- Zach Person

== 2022 ==
2022 Austin City Limits Music Festival was held over two weekends: October 7–9 and 14–16. The festival was headlined by Red Hot Chili Peppers, Pink, The Chicks, SZA, Kacey Musgraves, Flume, Paramore and Lil Nas X.

=== Weekend 1 ===
Weekend 1 Lineup (2022)

Friday, October 7:

- The Chicks
- SZA
- Nathaniel Rateliff & the Night Sweats
- James Blake
- Omar Apollo
- Carly Rae Jepsen
- Billy Strings
- Big Gigantic
- Arlo Parks
- Asleep at the Wheel
- Benee
- Cassandra Jenkins
- Charlotte Cardin
- Cory Henry
- Elijah Wolf
- Gabriels
- Gayle
- Genesis Owusu
- Jazmine Sullivan
- Kevin Morby
- L'Impératrice
- Lilyisthatyou
- Nation of Language
- Noah Cyrus
- Sarah and the Sundays
- Tamino
- THEBROSFRESH
- Zach Bryan
- Zai1k

Saturday, October 8:

- Pink
- Flume
- Lil Nas X
- Wallows
- Diplo
- The War on Drugs
- Tobe Nwigwe
- Purple Disco Machine
- Adrian Quesada's Boleros Psicodélicos
- Aly & AJ
- Big Boi
- Cimafunk
- Charlotte Sands
- Conan Gray
- DJ Mel
- Jessia
- Katzu Oso
- Lido Pimienta
- Mama Duke
- Manchester Orchestra
- Maude Latour
- Omah Lay
- Role Model
- Samia
- Slayyyter
- Sofi Tukker
- Spill Tab
- The Aquadolls
- The Future X
- The Past Lives
- The Ventures
- The Midnight
- Tyla Yaweh
- Walt Disco

Sunday, October 9:

- Red Hot Chili Peppers
- Kacey Musgraves
- Paramore
- Zhu
- Marcus Mumford
- Goose
- Bia
- Big Wild
- Buffalo Nichols
- Caleb de Casper
- Chicocurlyhead
- Claire Rosinkranz
- Darkbird
- Danielle Ponder
- Dehd
- Eric Tessmer
- Glove
- Goth Babe
- Happie Hoffman
- Isaac Dunbar
- Jake Wesley Rogers
- Japanese Breakfast
- Larry June
- Luna Luna
- Magdalena Bay
- Muna
- Oliver Tree
- PinkPantheress
- Primo the Alien
- Robert Glasper
- 6lack
- Spoon
- Taipei Houston
- Wesley Bray and the Disciples of Joy
- The Marías

=== Weekend 2 ===
Weekend 2 Lineup (2022)

Friday, October 14:

- The Chicks
- SZA
- Nathaniel Rateliff & the Night Sweats
- Phoenix
- Omar Apollo
- Lucky Daye
- Billy Strings
- Purple Disco Machine
- Arlo Parks
- Benee
- Bktherula
- Blondshell
- Conan Gray
- Dcarr
- Dro Kenji
- Early James
- Genesis Owusu
- Glaive
- Happie Hoffman
- The Huston-Tillotson University Jazz Collective
- Jazmine Sullivan
- L'Impératrice
- Lily Rose
- Noah Cyrus
- Sarah Kinsley
- Teezo Touchdown
- Twen
- Vacations
- Wet Leg

Saturday, October 15:

- Pink
- Flume
- Lil Nas X
- Wallows
- Diplo
- The War on Drugs
- Tobe Nwigwe
- Big Gigantic
- Ben Reilly
- Boy George & Culture Club
- Como las Movies
- Death Cab for Cutie
- Disko Cowboy
- Good Looks
- Habibi
- Izzy Heltai
- J Soulja
- Jake Lloyd
- Josh Fudge
- Lesly Reynaga
- Lido Pimienta
- Neil Frances
- Princess Nokia
- Ripe
- Sabrina Claudio
- Samia
- Sloppy Jane
- Sofi Tukker
- Southern Avenue
- Spill Tab
- Tai Verdes
- The Brummies
- The Front Bottoms
- The Midnight
- Tyla Yaweh

Sunday, October 16:

- Red Hot Chili Peppers
- Kacey Musgraves
- Paramore
- Zhu
- Marcus Mumford
- Goose
- Bia
- Big Wild
- Buffalo Nichols
- Danielle Ponder
- Dehd
- Faye Webster
- Flora & Fawna
- Glove
- Isaac Dunbar
- Jackson Dean
- Jake Wesley Rogers
- James Blake
- Japanese Breakfast
- Joshua Ray Walker
- Larry June
- Magdalena Bay
- Me nd Adam
- Oliver Tree
- PinkPantheress
- Pleasure Venom
- Robert Glasper
- Siena Liggins
- Spoon
- Taipei Houston
- The Spiritualettes
- Tom Odell
- Urban Heat
- Wilderado
- Yungblud
- The Marías

== 2023 ==
2023 Austin City Limits Music Festival was held over two weekends: October 6–8 and 13–15. The festival was headlined by Kendrick Lamar, Foo Fighters, Mumford & Sons, The Lumineers, Shania Twain (first weekend), The 1975 (second weekend), Odesza, Maggie Rogers, Alanis Morissette, Hozier, Major Lazer, Yeah Yeah Yeahs, and Labrinth.

=== Weekend 1 ===
Weekend 1 Lineup (2023)

Friday, October 6:

- Kendrick Lamar
- The Lumineers
- Maggie Rogers
- Kali Uchis
- Lil Yachty
- The Revivalists
- The Mars Volta
- FKJ
- Above & Beyond
- Abraham Alexander
- Asleep at the Wheel
- Bailen
- Bass Drum of Death
- Blond:ish
- Breland
- Brittney Spencer
- D4vd
- Delacey
- Devon Gilfillian
- Deyaz
- half•alive
- Julia Wolf
- Little Simz
- Nessa Barrett
- Portugal. The Man
- The Altons
- The National Parks
- The Teskey Brothers
- Thee Sacred Souls

Saturday, October 7:

- Foo Fighters
- Shania Twain
- Alanis Morissette
- Noah Kahan
- Tove Lo
- Bob Moses
- Chromeo
- Abby Sage
- Amaarae
- Angel White
- Arya
- Ben Kweller
- BigXthaPlug
- Calder Allen
- Christone "Kingfish" Ingram
- Coi Leray
- Declan McKenna
- Die Spitz
- Eddie Zuko
- Gus Clark
- Gus Dapperton
- Husbands
- Jessie Ware
- Mac Saturn
- Mt. Joy
- Patrick Martin
- Poolside
- Rina Sawayama
- Serayah
- Shaed
- Shooks
- Tanya Tucker
- Thirty Seconds to Mars
- Wunderhorse
- Yaya Bey

Sunday, October 8:

- Mumford & Sons
- Odesza
- Hozier
- Yeah Yeah Yeahs
- Labrinth
- Cigarettes After Sex
- Niall Horan
- Death Grips
- Sidepiece
- Ali Sethi
- Becky Hill
- Charlotte Adigéry & Bolis Pupul
- Dope Lemon
- Ellis Bullard
- GloRilla
- Grace Sorensen
- Iván Cornejo
- Jane Leo
- Katy Kirby
- Kevin Kaarl
- Madison Cunningham
- Major.
- Matt Maltese
- Michigander
- Mimi Webb
- Morgan Wade
- Randall King
- Suki Waterhouse
- Sunrose
- Tanner Usrey
- Tash Sultana
- The Breeders
- The Walkmen
- Wesley Bray & the Disciples of Joy
- Yves Tumor

=== Weekend 2 ===
Weekend 2 Lineup (2023)

Friday, October 13:

- Kendrick Lamar
- The Lumineers
- Maggie Rogers
- Kali Uchis
- Lil Yachty
- The Revivalists
- Portugal. The Man
- FKJ
- Above & Beyond
- Abraham Alexander
- Bailen
- Blond:ish
- Breland
- D4vd
- Devon Gilfillian
- Eloise
- Emlyn
- Ethel Cain
- Font
- GloRilla
- The Huston-Tillotson University Jazz Collective
- Jaime Wyatt
- Jimmie Vaughan & Tilt-a-Whirl Band
- Nessa Barrett
- Oliver Hazard
- Raye
- The Altons
- The Moss
- The Teskey Brothers
- Thee Sacred Souls
- We Don't Ride Llamas

Saturday, October 14:

- Foo Fighters
- The 1975
- Alanis Morissette
- Noah Kahan
- Tove Lo
- Bob Moses
- Tegan and Sara
- Angel White
- Amaarae
- Ben Kweller
- Blackhyl
- Calder Allen
- Coi Leray
- Declan McKenna
- Devon Gilfillian
- Eddie Zuko
- Goodnight, Texas
- Gus Dapperton
- Jessie Ware
- Miya Folick
- Mt. Joy
- Nemegata
- New West
- Pony Bradshaw
- Poolside
- Rattlesnake Milk
- Rina Sawayama
- Shaed
- Sincere Engineer
- Snõõper
- Sudan Archives
- Tanya Tucker
- Thirty Seconds to Mars
- Valley James
- CVC

Sunday, October 15:

- Mumford & Sons
- Odesza
- Hozier
- Yeah Yeah Yeahs
- Labrinth
- Cigarettes After Sex
- Niall Horan
- M83
- Death Grips
- Sidepiece
- Caramelo Haze
- Celisse
- Corey Kent
- Corook
- Del Water Gap
- Dope Lemon
- Iván Cornejo
- Kathryn Legendre
- Katy Kirby
- Kevin Kaarl
- Leon III
- Little Simz
- Madison Cunningham
- Michigander
- Mimi Webb
- Morgan Wade
- Myron Elkins
- Penny & Sparrow
- Quin NFN
- Randall King
- Sisi
- Suki Waterhouse
- The Breeders
- The Moriah Sisters
- Yves Tumor

== 2024 ==
The 2024 Austin City Limits Music Festival took place over two consecutive weekends, October 4–6 and October 11–13, at Zilker Park in Austin, Texas. The eight primary headliners were Dua Lipa, Tyler, The Creator, Chris Stapleton, Blink-182, Sturgill Simpson, Pretty Lights, Leon Bridges, and Khruangbin. More than 100 artists appeared across nine stages each weekend; Hulu again served as the exclusive U.S. streaming partner for select Weekend 1 sets.

=== Weekend 1 ===
Weekend 1 Lineup (2024)

Friday, October 4:

- Chris Stapleton
- Blink-182
- Leon Bridges
- Barry Can't Swim
- Carín León
- Catfish and the Bottlemen
- Chance Peña
- Chapparelle
- Connor Price
- Dasha
- Dexter and the Moonrocks
- Elderbrook
- Eggy
- Fletcher
- Foster the People
- Huston-Tillotson Univ. Jazz Collective
- Katie Pruitt
- Late Night Drive Home
- Mannequin Pussy
- The Marías
- Midnight Navy
- Mister G
- Mon Rovía
- Norah Jones
- Paco Versailles
- Penny & Sparrow
- Porter Robinson
- Q Brothers
- Andrew & Polly
- Sir Chloe
- Stephen Sanchez
- Tanner Adell
- Theo Lawrence
- The Paper Kites
- Thee Sinseers
- WhooKilledKenny
- Braxton Keith

Saturday, October 5:

- Dua Lipa
- Pretty Lights
- Khruangbin
- Benson Boone
- Bob Schneider
- Being Dead
- Billy Allen & the Pollies
- Brittany Davis
- Chappell Roan
- Emei
- Eyedress
- Geese
- Godly the Ruler
- Goldie Boutilier
- Hermanos Gutiérrez
- Joe P
- Jonah Kagen
- Jon Muq
- Jordy
- Jungle
- Kenny Beats
- Lola Young
- Movements
- Nico Vega
- Obed Padilla
- PawPaw Rod
- Promqueendom
- Renée Rapp
- Rett Madison
- Sawyer Hill
- Say She She
- Something Corporate
- Spinall
- Still Woozy
- Teddy Swims
- Telescreens
- The Barton Hills Choir
- The Beaches
- The Criticals
- Uncle Jumbo
- Vince Staples
- Wave to Earth
- Elyanna
- Zach Person

Sunday, October 6:

- Tyler, The Creator
- Sturgill Simpson
- Amira Elfeky
- Bakar
- Caamp
- Cale Tyson
- Cannons
- Chief Cleopatra
- Daistar
- David Shaw
- Deyaz
- Dom Dolla
- Emily Nenni
- Flo
- Flipturn
- Glass Beams
- Homescool
- Jess Glynne
- Kehlani
- Kevin Abstract
- Lucy Kalantari & the Jazz Cats
- Malcolm Todd
- Marley Bleu
- Medium Build
- Miss Twitty & the Fruity Band
- MisterWives
- Molecular Steve
- Myles Smith
- Orville Peck
- Petey
- Queen Herby
- Richy Mitch & the Coal Miners
- Rickshaw Billie's Burger Patrol
- San Holo
- School of Rock
- The Levites
- The Mexican OT
- The Moriah Sisters
- Tyler Halverson
- West 22nd

=== Weekend 2 ===
Weekend 2 Lineup (2024)

Friday, October 11:

- Chris Stapleton
- Blink-182
- Leon Bridges
- Asleep at the Wheel
- Barry Can't Swim
- Braxton Keith
- Carín León
- Catfish and the Bottlemen
- Connor Price
- Dasha
- Dexter and the Moonrocks
- Elderbrook
- Eggy
- Foster the People
- Jeezy
- Katie Pruitt
- Late Night Drive Home
- Mannequin Pussy
- The Marías
- Mickey Guyton
- Mon Rovía
- Norah Jones
- Penny & Sparrow
- Royel Otis
- Santigold
- Sir Chloe
- Stephen Sanchez
- Tanner Adell
- Theo Lawrence
- The Paper Kites
- Tyla

Saturday, October 12:

- Dua Lipa
- Pretty Lights
- Khruangbin
- Balthvs
- Benson Boone
- Billy Allen & the Pollies
- Bob Schneider
- Being Dead
- Brittany Davis
- Chappell Roan
- Emei
- Eyedress
- Geese
- Godly the Ruler
- Goldie Boutilier
- Grand Funk Railroad
- Hermanos Gutiérrez
- I Dont Know How but They Found Me
- Joe P
- Jonah Kagen
- Jon Muq
- Jordy
- Jungle
- Kenny Beats
- Lola Young
- Movements
- Nico Vega
- Obed Padilla
- PawPaw Rod
- Promqueendom
- Remi Wolf
- Renée Rapp
- Rett Madison
- Sawyer Hill
- Say She She
- Something Corporate
- Spinall
- Teddy Swims
- Telescreens
- The Barton Hills Choir
- The Beaches
- The Criticals
- The Tiarras
- Uncle Jumbo
- Valencia Grace
- Vince Staples
- Wave to Earth
- Elyanna
- Zach Person

Sunday, October 13:

- Tyler, The Creator
- Sturgill Simpson
- Bakar
- Caamp
- Cannons
- Chief Cleopatra
- Daistar
- David Shaw
- Dom Dolla
- Dustin Kensrue
- Emily Nenni
- Flo
- Flipturn
- Glass Beams
- Jess Glynne
- Kalu & the Electric Joint
- Kevin Abstract
- Lucy Kalantari & the Jazz Cats
- Malcolm Todd
- Medium Build
- MisterWives
- Myles Smith
- Orville Peck
- Petey
- Queen Herby
- Richy Mitch & the Coal Miners
- Rickshaw Billie's Burger Patrol
- San Holo
- The Barton Hills Choir
- The Droptines
- The Mexican OT
- The Red Clay Strays
- West 22nd

== 2025 ==
The 2025 Austin City Limits Music Festival took place over two weekends: October 3–5 and October 10–12, at Zilker Park in Austin, Texas. The headliners included Hozier, Luke Combs, Cage the Elephant, Empire of the Sun, Sabrina Carpenter, The Strokes, Doechii, Djo, John Summit, Feid, T-Pain, and Mk.gee. On August 29, 2025, Doja Cat withdrew from the lineup citing scheduling and album-release commitments, and festival organizers announced The Killers as the Sunday headliner for both weekends in her place.

=== Weekend 1 ===
Weekend 1 Lineup (2025)

Friday, October 3:

- Hozier
- Luke Combs
- Cage the Elephant
- Empire of the Sun
- Maren Morris
- Role Model
- Dr. Dog
- King Princess
- Dylan Gossett
- MJ Lenderman
- The Favors
- Willow Avalon
- Briscoe
- Confidence Man
- Panda Bear
- Tanner Usrey
- Good Neighbours
- Spill Tab
- Jensen McRae
- Honestav
- Vincent Lima
- Amble
- Tiera Kennedy
- Asleep at the Wheel
- Nicky Youre
- Moody Joody
- LVVRS
- The Animeros

Saturday, October 4:

- Sabrina Carpenter
- The Strokes
- Doechii
- Djo
- Sammy Virji
- Modest Mouse
- The Backseat Lovers
- Japanese Breakfast
- Magdalena Bay
- Olivia Dean
- Marina
- Riize
- Latin Mafia
- Ocean Alley
- Joey Valence & Brae
- Spacey Jane
- Celeste
- Yoke Lore
- LA LOM
- Alemeda
- Don West
- Orions Belte
- The Heavy Heavy
- Hotline TNT
- Sydney Rose
- Next of Kin
- INOHA
- Clover County
- S.L. Houser
- GoldFord
- LP Giobbi

Sunday, October 5:

- The Killers
- John Summit
- Feid
- T-Pain
- Mk.gee
- Polo & Pan
- Rainbow Kitten Surprise
- Wet Leg
- Gigi Perez
- Disco Lines
- Phantogram
- Passion Pit
- The Dare
- Wild Rivers
- Anderson East
- Lucius
- Royal & the Serpent
- Flowerovlove
- Haute & Freddy
- Midnight Generation
- Chezile
- Bebe Stockwell
- Lamont Landers
- Chuwi
- Zinadelphia
- Tyler Ballgame
- Geto Gala
- Gizmo Varillas
- Aaron Page
- Disciples of Christ

=== Weekend 2 ===
Weekend 2 Lineup (2025)

Friday, October 10:

- Hozier
- Luke Combs
- Cage the Elephant
- Empire of the Sun
- Rilo Kiley
- Sam Barber
- Role Model
- Dr. Dog
- King Princess
- Dylan Gossett
- MJ Lenderman
- The Favors
- Bilmuri
- Confidence Man
- Panda Bear
- Tanner Usrey
- Good Neighbours
- Spill Tab
- Jensen McRae
- Vincent Lima
- Amble
- Crowe Boys
- Aidan Bissett
- Johnny Stimson
- Fancy Hagood
- Skrilla
- Maggie Antone
- Girl Tones
- Farmer's Wife

Saturday, October 11:

- Sabrina Carpenter
- The Strokes
- Doechii
- Djo
- Pierce the Veil
- Zeds Dead
- Japanese Breakfast
- Car Seat Headrest
- Magdalena Bay
- Olivia Dean
- Marina
- Fujii Kaze
- Latin Mafia
- Ocean Alley
- Joey Valence & Brae
- LP Giobbi
- Leisure
- Spacey Jane
- Yoke Lore
- LA LOM
- Tops
- Alemeda
- Don West
- Odeal
- Sydney Rose
- Eric Slick
- Southall
- South Arcade
- Dizzy Fae
- Shallowater
- Ted Hammig and the Campaign

Sunday, October 12:

- The Killers
- John Summit
- Feid
- T-Pain
- Mk.gee
- Alex Amen
- Ally Salort
- Anderson East
- CA7RIEL & Paco Amoroso
- Chezile
- Disco Lines
- Flowerovlove
- Gigi Perez
- Gregory Alan Isakov
- Hans Williams
- Hey, Nothing.
- Huston–Tillotson University Jazz Collective
- Julie
- Lucius
- Midnight Generation
- Passion Pit
- Polo & Pan
- Rainbow Kitten Surprise
- Royal & the Serpent
- The Bends
- The Dare
- The Point.
- Wet Leg

== 2026 ==
The 2026 Austin City Limits Music Festival is scheduled to take place over two weekends: October 2–4 and October 9–11, at Zilker Park in Austin, Texas. The lineup was announced on May 5, 2026, with headliners including Charli XCX, Rüfüs Du Sol, Twenty One Pilots, Lorde, and The xx; Skrillex is listed for Weekend 1, and Kings of Leon for Weekend 2.

=== Weekend 1 ===
Weekend 1 Lineup (2026)
- Charli XCX
- RÜFÜS DU SOL
- Twenty One Pilots
- Lorde
- Skrillex
- The xx
- Turnstile
- Labrinth
- Lola Young
- The Chainsmokers
- Geese
- Young Miko
- Bleachers
- Sofi Tukker
- Parcels
- The War on Drugs
- Leon Thomas
- Brandon Flowers
- Blood Orange
- Lykke Li
- Levity
- Max McNown
- Suki Waterhouse
- Amyl and the Sniffers
- Snow Strippers
- Cannons
- Steve Aoki
- Audrey Hobert
- Jesse Welles
- BUNT.
- It's Murph
- Fakemink
- Palace
- Saint Motel
- Fcukers
- ¥ØU$UKE ¥UK1MAT$U
- Stellalefty
- Paris Paloma
- LP
- Rusowsky
- Rodrigo y Gabriela
- Skye Newman
- Balu Brigada
- Claire Rosinkranz
- Marlon Funaki
- Rochelle Jordan
- underscores
- Noga Erez
- CMAT
- Rebecca Black
- Arcy Drive
- Rio Kosta
- Finn Wolfhard
- Josh Conway
- Ryan Beatty
- Don West
- Temper City
- Bo Staloch
- Molly Santana
- Paloma Morphy
- Sunday (1994)
- Hunx and His Punx
- Calder Allen
- Night Tapes
- Faouzia
- Fancy Hagood
- New Constellations
- Britton
- Solya
- Villanelle
- Asleep at the Wheel
- DJ Cassandra
- Cure for Paranoia
- Night Traveler
- Grocery Bag
- Aaron Rowe
- Fai Laci
- Lauren Sanderson
- Emma Ogier
- Coleman Jennings
- Izzy Escobar
- Elle Coves
- Rubio
- Fightmaster
- Left Lucid
- Solomon Hicks
- The 4411
- The Moriah Sisters

=== Weekend 2 ===
Weekend 2 Lineup (2026)
- Charli XCX
- RÜFÜS DU SOL
- Twenty One Pilots
- Lorde
- Kings of Leon
- The xx
- Turnstile
- Labrinth
- Lola Young
- The Chainsmokers
- Geese
- Young Miko
- Bleachers
- Sofi Tukker
- Parcels
- The War on Drugs
- Leon Thomas
- Blood Orange
- Lykke Li
- Levity
- Max McNown
- Suki Waterhouse
- Amyl and the Sniffers
- Sienna Spiro
- Snow Strippers
- Steve Aoki
- Audrey Hobert
- Jesse Welles
- BUNT.
- It's Murph
- Fakemink
- Saint Motel
- Houndmouth
- Fcukers
- Bella Kay
- ¥ØU$UKE ¥UK1MAT$U
- Paris Paloma
- LP
- Rusowsky
- Rodrigo y Gabriela
- Natasha Bedingfield
- Łaszewo
- Skye Newman
- Balu Brigada
- Claire Rosinkranz
- Kingfishr
- Noga Erez
- CMAT
- Arcy Drive
- Rio Kosta
- Finn Wolfhard
- Ryan Beatty
- Don West
- Temper City
- Ethan Regan
- Charlotte Lawrence
- Bad Nerves
- World Famous Pets
- Gabriel Jacoby
- Paloma Morphy
- Sunday (1994)
- Rum Jungle
- Calder Allen
- Night Tapes
- Faouzia
- Kevin Atwater
- Thomas Day
- Cassandra Coleman
- S.G. Goodman
- Brigitte Calls Me Baby
- Dallas Wax
- Nat Myers
- Joe Jordan
- Chloe Qisha
- Happy Landing
- Vwillz
- Sasha Keable
- Common People
- Girlfriend
- Damaris Bojor
- Chelsea Jordan
- Marzz
- Lluvii
- Montclair
- Almost Heaven
- Leon Knight
- Presley Regier
- The Huston-Tillotson University Jazz Collective
