= The Acappella Swingers =

Sicilian musical voice group

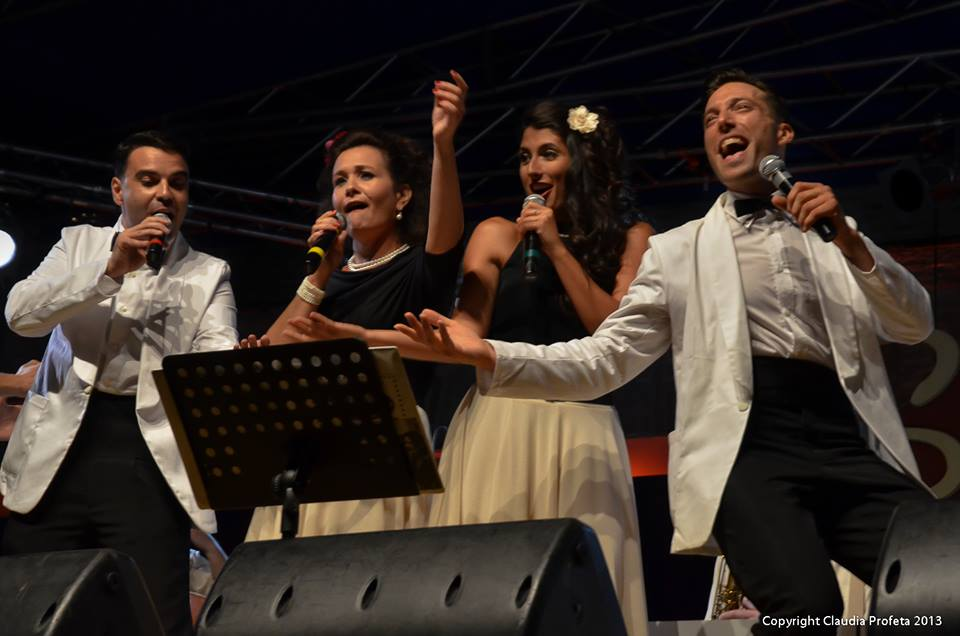
The Acappella Swingers

The Acappella Swingers is a musical voice group founded in Catania in 2005. It consists of two male and two female voices and the style is that of the doo-wop and a cappella sound.

Their repertoire goes back to the classics of the Fifties as Rama-Lama-Ding-Dong, "Who Put the Bomp (in the Bomp, Bomp, Bomp)", The Wanderer and others.

== History ==
The Acappella Swingers in 2008, in the original formation composed of 5 elements, (Dario Greco, leader and founder of the group, Gemma La Pergola, Marco Tinnirello, Michael Lauria, Elisa Caudullo) start nationwide participating in the first edition of the TV talent show X Factor ( Rai 2). They had their performance during the third episode (25/03) singing Unchained Melody, but they didn't pass the test of televoting that rewarded the Neapolitan singer Silvia Aprile.

After the experience of X-Factor they focused their attention in recording their first album, produced by the label Waterbirds, property of Maria Midulla, the Francesco Virlinzi's mother, founder of the label Cyclops Records. The CD, produced by Toni Carbone of Denovo is called “Let's on Doowop” and repeats the classic style, plus two new songs: “You” and “Blue Moon Serenade”.

In 2009 the song "You" (D. Greco), is selected from the Crystal Ball Records American record label, and included in the compilation of doo-wop song "Doo Wopin 'Around the World Vol I", which collects 28 tracks groups from around the world.

In 2009, participating in the 10th Festival of New Song Sicilian with a new song dialect written by Michael Lauria entitled “Quannu puru i spini mi parunu ciuri”, placed in the 6th place out of 30 artists of great depth of regional and national level as the Lautari, Tinturia, Rita Botto, Qbeta, Archinuè, Alfio Antico, Francesca Alotta, Patrizia Laquidara and the winner of the festival Mario Incudine.

Always with the "Waterbirds" label, in December of that year they released their second CD, this time dedicated to Christmas. The CD is titled "Merry Christmas" and repeats 8 classic Christmas twist Doowop, strictly sung a cappella.

In 2010 Michael Lauria left the group and The Acappella Swingers decide to become a quartet.

In September 2011 they took the stage of Etna Comics, with the temporary vocal support of Giorgia Spadaccini and they performed with the band "La mente di Tetsuya", Vince Tempera and Luigi Albertelli in their show. The show will be repeated in October of that year on stage at the Lucca Comics & Games.

In November 2011 Gemma La Pergola is replaced, as the fourth component, by Antonella Leotta.

In 2012 the song "Blue Moon Serenade" (D. Greco), is selected from the Crystal Ball Records American record label, and included in the compilation of doo-wop song "Doo Wopin 'Around the World Vol II".

23 of July, 2012: The Acappella Swingers publish their new EP, Swing to the moon. It contains five original Doo-wop songs written by Dario Greco, featuring a modern sound. For the first time, an acoustic guitar accompanies the group's four voices.

== Components ==
The current components are

- Dario Greco
- Elisa Caudullo
- Teresa Raneri
- Alessandro Spagna

== Former change ==
Fabrizio Giuffrida ('05 -'06) Claudia Calà ('05 -'06) Marco Aliotta ('06 -'07) Cristina Marano ('06 -'07) Michael Lauria ('07 -'10) Gemma La Pergola ('05- '11) Giorgia Spadaccini ('11) Marco Tinnirello ('06 - '14) Antonella Leotta ('11 - '14)

== Discography ==
- Let's on Doo-wop (2008)
- Merry Christmas (2009)
- Swing to the Moon (EP 2012)
