= Haerfest =

American leather accessories brand

- Industry: Fashion
- Founded: 2011; 15 years ago
- Founder: Tim Joo, Dan Joo
- Headquarters: New York, United States
- Website: haerfest.com

Haerfest (pronounced "harvest") is a leather accessories brand that primarily makes tailored leather bags. Established by brothers Tim and Dan Joo, the company makes leather goods for a global market.

== History ==
Tim and Dan Joo, two brothers, launched Haerfest in 2011. Backpacks made of customized leather were the brand's first product.

Opening Ceremony recognized the potential behind the idea presented by Haerfest. It placed an order for the first Haerfest collection.

After its initial launch, Haerfest was able to establish its signature interpretation of the familiar.

Haerfest's product line steadily grew over the years. From its initial line of tailored backpacks, the company expanded to produce a whole range of leather accessories. They currently produce all-gender bags as well as small leather accessories. At the same time, it is beginning to expand its distribution line, starting with a store in New York.

== Signature style ==
This was designed to make the product unique and functional. In most bags, the straps are sewn into the seams of the bags. However, Haerfest's single strap system introduces a ring and stud system, enhancing the owner's freedom of movement.

== Awards and recognition ==
The brand has since won a number of awards since its establishment.

- CFDA Incubator Program – Awarded acceptance into the CFDA Fashion Incubator business development program 2016–2017
- DENYC – Awarded first prize of the Design Entrepreneurs NYC competition of 2016 by the Fashion Institute of Technology (FIT) and the New York City Economic Development Corporation (NYCEDC)
