= The Aquadolls =

American band

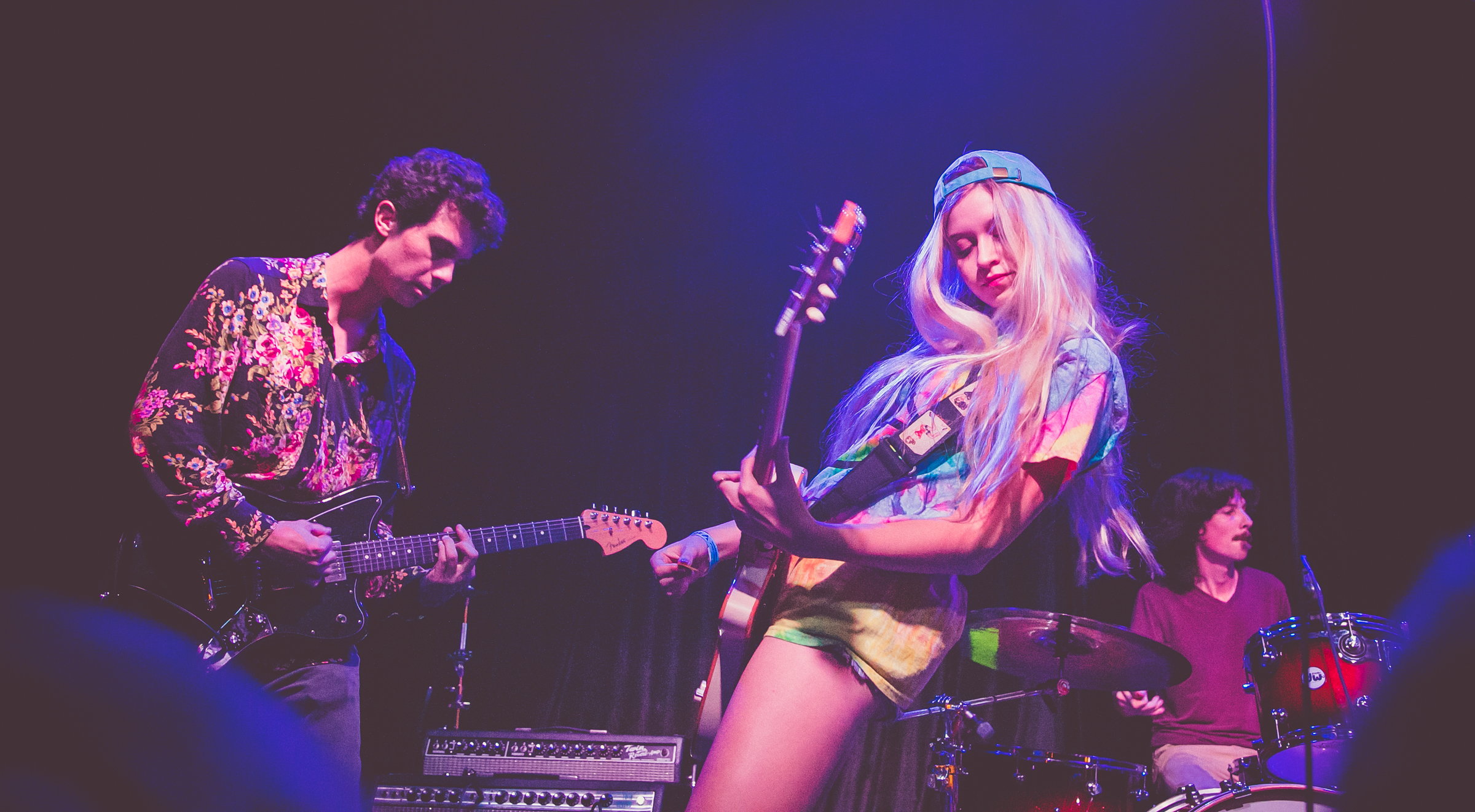
The Aquadolls performing with Melissa Brooks in the middle.

The Aquadolls are an alternative band formed in 2012 by Melissa Brooks. After forming the band, she released her first EP, followed by an album. After a hiatus from making music, Keilah Nina and Jaqueline Proctor joined the band. Together, they released the band's sophomore album called The Dream and Deception in 2018 and in recent years, the album Charmed in 2023. The band is known for the wide range of influences present in their music. Since the band's creation, they've performed with a variety of artists and at festivals such as Lollapalooza.

== Formation ==
The Aquadolls were founded in January 2012 by Melissa Brooks in La Mirada, California. She started by recording bedroom demos of her songs. She later released her first EP, We Are Free, with Burger Records in Early 2013 and Stoked on You in December 2014. After a brief period, she released Bleach 7 on her self-made record label, Aqua Babe Records, in June 2018.

Melissa then began searching for musicians to play in the band, deciding on Keilah Nina as bassist and Jacqueline Proctor as drummer. Together, the band released their sophomore album, The Dream and Deception, on October 28, 2018. Melissa describes the album as a dream that shifts into a nightmare. The first half of the album, which is meant to be the dream, is more upbeat with dark lyrics. The second half of the album turns dark, with a sound that’s “angry and rebellious”. This is also represented in the album cover. She has also stated that The Dream and Deception was written over the course of five years and she recorded the music on her laptop. She even quit school to work on the album full-time.

Following their sophomore album, they released their single "Suck On This" in the summer of 2019 and a cover of Lash's "Take Me Away" in October 2020. Since the band's creation, the band has performed with artists such as Pennywise and Jimmy Eat World. They've performed at Lollapalooza, Warped Tour, and Eddie Vedder's Ohana Festival. They also went on tour with Incubus and Sublime With Rome.

They recently released their album Charmed in 2023, the title being inspired by the 90's show, Charmed. Charmed showcases the band's growth with the influences from 60's and 90's music. While Fat Mike produced some of their previous work, Chris Szczech worked on this album. It’s also the first album that all three of the members wrote. Many songs on the album focus on love and relationships. "Sneaky" for example is a song about being someone's fling and being uncertain about the relationship. Melissa wrote heavily on this song and says it was inspired by a fling she had. However, "Beachy" is a song about the struggle of coming out of a global pandemic and quarantine. Melissa Brooks says the song "takes the listener on a trip to the California sunshine with reverb-y guitar and saccharine vocals”.

In general, The Aquadoll’s influences for their music include: doo wop, surf, 50's pop, riot grrrl punk, and Britney Spears. Their influences also show in their music videos. The band says that the music video for Cry Baby was inspired by John Waters' films such as Pink Flamingos, Hairspray, and Cry Baby. Melissa says that sonically, the band was influenced by 1960s pop for the song, pulling inspiration from Brian Wilson.

== Members ==
Melissa Brooks is the band's primary singer, songwriter, and guitarist. She grew up in a small town she describes as the halfway point between Los Angeles and the beach. Music was played around her a lot as a child and when a music coach heard her sing at 3 years old in the grocery store, she was later signed up for voice lessons. Melissa started writing songs in second grade by journaling and writing poems. When she eventually started the band, her friend came up with the name, the inspiration being Melissa’s love of mermaids and the beach. Melissa Brooks was interested in music for most of her life, being in church choir and musical theater as a kid. She has talked about being inspired by No Doubt and Gwen Stefani, which was her first concert experience. She also was inspired by Bikini Kill, Britney Spears, Christina Aguilera, and Avril Lavigne. She started their record label, Aqua Babe Records, in 2018 because she wanted to have more control over her own music. While she loves being able to have control over her music production, she does say that it’s difficult because a lot of what she does is self-funded.

Keilah Nina is the band's bassist. She has said that music was very prevalent in her life. While both of her grandparents were musicians, both of her parents were deaf. Because of this, her parents were very strict about what she heard. However, in middle school, she began to curate her own taste and discovered her love for music through being in emo bands and participating in musical theater. As a result, Keilah ended up having a love for punk music.

Jacqueline, also known as Jackie, is the band's drummer. She has been playing music since she was young and started out playing the piano but later quit to play the drums like her uncle did. She says one of her influences growing up was Dave Grohl and she remembers watching him play the guitar on MTV. That was the moment she realized she never wanted to give up on music. She recalls that when she first started playing drums, it made her feel confident, and she liked the idea of being an inspiration for other young girls.

When asked what message they wanted to convey with their music, they said they wanted their fans to feel confident and empowered to achieve their goals.

== Critical reception ==
Kat Dobay has given each song on Charmed high praise. For example, she describes the first song on the album, Far Far Away, as an energetic summer song for people who want to reclaim their independence. The lyrics talk about the challenges of maintaining a healthy work-life balance and the struggles of being stuck in a routine. Dobay writes, "For me, it invokes the angst I was constantly wrestling with while working my first job."The writer also describes Burn Baby Burn as an energetic song that showcases this best through its strong vocals and grunge-inspired sound. "It serves as both an anthem of resistance and a declaration of empowerment".

A guest contributor for Reflector praised the song, Beachy for its interesting sound and ability to capture the feelings about being in lockdown during the pandemic. They write, "In a post-lockdown world, many artists fail to deliver these lyrical themes in a prototypical way, but ‘Beachy’ tackles these ideas earnestly."

Julie River praises Charmed for its themes and sound, even comparing one of the tracks to an L7 song. She goes on to say that the album is their best produced so far. "Still, they show the kind of talent that promises that their best album is still yet to come. But that doesn’t change the fact that this album is an absolute joy to listen to."

A writer for The New Zealand Herald has described the band as "a missing link between 60s girl groups, California surf-pop, 90s skater rock and Taylor Swift's assertive pop-sassiness..."

Madison Walters compares Sneaky to Dirty Little Secret by All American Rejects, with this song being told from the other perspective, that being the perspective of someone who is the "dirty little secret". The author goes on to say that the single is a sign of a great album to come. "If “Beachy” and “Sneaky” are any indication of what their third studio album will sound like, then Charmed promises to be an album full of growth both in music and in self-love/positivity."

Chloe Catajan has praised Disappearing Girl for its storytelling through lyrics, allowing the listener to empathize with the protagonist in the song. "If you were looking for a new mood-booster, this is it".

Briton Alexander has said that Disappearing Girl is a song worth listening to. "These witty women excel at blending genres and garnering the attention they rightfully deserve".

== See also ==
- Punk rock
- All-female band
