= Jones Family Singers =

American gospel music group

The Jones Family Singers is a Texas-based gospel soul/funk music group.

== History ==
The family, including Fred Jones and seven of his children, had in the late 90s and early 2000s been performing for their own and other local churches near their home base of Bay City, Texas. Fred Jones is the pastor of Mt. Zion Pentecostal Holiness Church in Markham, Texas. In 2012 the group performed at SXSW music festival and in 2014 at Lincoln Center. They were scheduled to perform at the 2020 SXSW music festival.

In 2015 a documentary, The Jones Family Will Make A Way, was released.

CNN featured them when multiple family members were infected within a week by COVID-19.

== Reception ==
The group has been called "must-see" by Rolling Stone and NPR. The New York Times called them "rip-roaring".
