= The Gospel Stars =

American gospel music group

- Origin: Detroit, Michigan, U.S.
- Genres: Soul; gospel; funk
- Years active: 1960–1961
- Labels: Motown
- Past members: Mae Gooch; Etta Gooch; Sandra Gooch; Elizabeth Davis; Lillian Woods; Lois Holden

The Gospel Stars was a gospel music group that recorded and released the first Motown (then known as Tamla Records) album in the label's history. They had been active in Washington D.C. since the 1940s and joined Tamla in Detroit in 1960.

The LP was released on March 7, 1961, called The Great Gospel Stars, and consisted of five A-sides and their corresponding B-sides. The producer was Berry Gordy, founder of the company. Their tenure at Motown was short-lived, having left later that year.

== Members ==
The Gospel Stars consisted of Mae, Etta, and Sandra Gooch, Elizabeth Davis, Lillian Woods, and Lois Holden. Holden (née Russell), who was born in Thomaston, Alabama on February 2, 1910, died in Detroit, Michigan on May 5, 2020, aged 110 years, making her a supercentenarian. She was the last surviving member of the group.

== The Great Gospel Stars (1961) ==
The LP The Great Gospel Stars had the following tracklist of 10 songs.

1. A1 "He Lifted Me"
2. A2 "Jacob Wrestled With The Angels"
3. A3 "He Knows It All"
4. A4 "Make Everything Alright"
5. A5 "If Any Man"
6. B1 "Swing Low"
7. B2 "Behold The Saints Of God"
8. B3 "Lamb On The Altar"
9. B4 "He's Using Me"
10. B5 "Sweet Bye & Bye"
