= We Hug Now =

2025 single by Sydney Rose

Single by Sydney Rose

from the EP I Know What I Want
- Released: February 13, 2025
- Genre: Pop
- Length: 4:08
- Label: Mercury
- Songwriter: Sydney Rose
- Producer: Matt Martin

Sydney Rose singles chronology
| "Piano Man" (2024) | "We Hug Now" (2025) | "Before & After You" (2025) |

Music video
- "We Hug Now" on YouTube

"We Hug Now" is a song by American singer-songwriter Sydney Rose, released on February 13, 2025 as the lead single from her EP I Know What I Want (2025). It went viral on the video-sharing app TikTok and is considered her breakout hit.

== Background and promotion ==
The song found popularity on TikTok, with many videos centering around the lyrics "You're just thinkin' it's a small thing that happened / The world ended when it happened to me." As a result of its TikTok success, it nearly 4.3 official on-demand streams in the United States for the tracking week ending on March 6, 2025, which according to Luminate was an 345% increase from three weeks earlier.

== Composition ==
The song begins as a "gentle, echoing ballad", described as in the style of Phoebe Bridgers. The beat switches as the climax of the song, to a mid-tempo and more "cathartic" sound.

== Music video ==
The music video was recorded by Sydney Rose herself. In an interview with The Knockturnal, she described the creation of the video:

It's exactly how I feel when I hear the song. [I was with] my friend Sophia — who is literally in the music video — and we sat in my bed, and just wrote out how I would want the music video to go and [the team] kind of took it and ran with it. It's like my Pinterest board came to life. Everything that I wrote down came to life. I'm so happy with the way it came out, because it's exactly how I felt when I wrote the song and how I feel when I listened to the song. I finally got to do my moment where I look out the window longingly while listening to a really sad song. And the fact that people are like, "Oh my God, it's a friendship breakup song," even though it's kind of maybe a little bit obvious, it's just nice for people to be like, "Oh my God, it's confirmed."

== Charts ==
=== Weekly charts ===
Weekly chart performance for "We Hug Now"
| Chart (2025) | Peak position |
|---|---|
| UK Singles (Official Charts) | 48 |
| US Bubbling Under Hot 100 (Billboard) | 4 |

=== Year-end charts ===
Year-end chart performance for "We Hug Now"
| Chart (2025) | Position |
|---|---|
| US Hot Rock & Alternative Songs (Billboard) | 38 |

== Certifications ==
Certifications and sales for "We Hug Now"
| Region | Certification | Certified units/sales |
|---|---|---|
| Brazil (Pro-Música Brasil) | Platinum | 40,000^{‡} |
| Canada (Music Canada) | Platinum | 80,000^{‡} |
| New Zealand (RMNZ) | Gold | 15,000^{‡} |
^{‡} Sales+streaming figures based on certification alone.
