= Snowmine =

American Indie Pop Band

Snowmine is an American indie pop band from Brooklyn, New York.

== History ==
Snowmine was formed in 2010. They self-released their debut studio album in 2011 titled Laminate Pet Animal. They released their second full-length album in 2014 on Mystery Buildings titled Dialects.

== Band members ==
- Grayson Sanders (lead vocals, keys)
- Jay Goodman (bass)
- Alex Beckmann (drums)
- Austin Mendenhall (guitar)
- Calvin Pia (guitar, keys, backing vocals)

== Discography ==
Studio albums

- Laminate Pet Animal (2011, self-released)
- Dialects (2014, Mystery Buildings)
