= Leatherbag =

- Also known as: No Future
- Origin: Austin, Texas
- Genres: Rock
- Years active: 2005–2012
- Label: Superpop
- Past members: Randy Reynolds; Drew Emmons; Daniel Blanchard

Leatherbag was a rock band from Austin, Texas formed in 2005 by songwriter Randy Reynolds after moving from Houston. The band's name comes from a passage in the James Joyce novel, Finnegans Wake.

The Austin Chronicle's critic wrote, in reviewing the album Nowhere Left to Run, "There's no denying Leatherbag's talent". In discussing the band's album Love and Harm, NPR critic David Brown described the sound as "a frenetic garage-rock charge reined in by melodies that early Wilco would be proud to call its own".

In August 2010 the band edited their own Wikipedia page.

The band performed at The 2009 Austin City Limits Music Festival. They were showcased on the web series, ACL presents Satellite Sets and were also an official performer at SXSW 2010. After much deliberation, Leatherbag changed names to 'No Future' following a short tour of the South in late March 2012.

== Members ==
- Randy Reynolds
- Drew Emmons
- Daniel Blanchard

The band identified itself with the New Sincerity movement.

== Discography ==
- So Long Sweethearts (2005)
- Love Me Like the Devil (2006)
- Nowhere Left to Run (2007)
- Love & Harm (2008)
- Tomorrow EP (2009)
- Everything I Once Knew EP (2009)
- Hey Day (2010)
- Live At The Parish (2011)
- Patience EP (2011)
- Yellow Television (2011)
- Ditto Time (2012)

== Compilations ==
- Natrix Natirx #7 Cassette Compilation (2007)
- Sound Advice Volume I An Austin Sound Compilation (2007)
- Superpop Records Seasons Greetings Compilation (2009)
- The Versatile Syndicate - Cache: Volume 2 (2010)
- I Don't Have A Mane: Poem Songs (2011)
- KUT Live Volume 11 (2011)

=== Related Appearances ===
- John Rose - Present Imperfect (2006)
- David Israel - These Are The Clothes We'll Wear When We're Old (2006)
- Karrie Hopper - An Unusual Move (2007)
- No Bridges To Cross - S/T (2007)
- Diamondhead - Street Leaf (2008)
- Diamondhead - Dirty Realism (2008)
- Graham Weber - Door To The Morning (2008)
- Jude/Ross - S/T (2009)
- Kirk Van Praag - Town Crier (2010)
- Lonnie Eugene Methe - Hey Jack Plus Six Other Songs (2010)
- Ryan Thomas Becker & Last Joke - Last Joke Band (2011)
- Golden Bear - Alive (2011)
- Wiretree - Make Up (2011)
