= Pernikoff Brothers =

American rock band

- Origin: St. Louis, Missouri, United States
- Genres: Rock, indie rock, folk rock, Americana
- Years active: 2009–present
- Labels: Independent
- Members: Tom Pernikoff; Rick Pernikoff; Kevin Bowers
- Website: www.pernikoffbrothers.com

Pernikoff Brothers is an American rock band from St. Louis, Missouri. The band consists of brothers Tom (vocals, guitar) and Rick Pernikoff (vocals, bass), and Kevin Bowers (drums).

== History ==
Pernikoff Brothers first began performing as a duo in the Bay Area. In 2009, they were joined by drummer, Dan Germain, from Boston, MA. Since the release, the Pernikoff Brothers have played with acts such as Willie Nelson, G. Love, Tim Reynolds (of the Dave Matthews Band), Lukas Nelson & Promise of the Real, Railroad Earth, The Revivalists and Toots & the Maytals. They were invited to perform at the BMI stage at the 2011 Austin City Limits Music Festival, the BMI showcase at the 2011 CMJ Music Marathon, and the Key West Songwriter's Festival.

After a hiatus, the Pernikoff Brothers recorded at the legendary Abbey Road Studios in London, England. They released the one-day live session in Studio 2 with the title Ah Londres.

== Band members ==
- Tom Pernikoff – vocals, guitar, bass
- Rick Pernikoff – vocals, bass, guitar, harmonica
- Kevin Bowers – drums, percussion

== Discography ==
- On My Way (2011)
- Miss Fortune Teller (2013)
- Ah Londres (2025)
