= The Eastern Sea =

Indie rock band from Austin, Texas

- Origin: Austin, Texas; United States
- Genres: Indie pop Indie rock Progressive pop
- Years active: 2005—present
- Label: WhitelabBlacklab
- Members: Matthew Hines; Tomas Garcia-olano; Kevin Thomas; Kurt Lammers; Andy Beaudoin
- Past members: Zach Duran; Jess Graves; Chris Ulsh; Chris D'Annunzio; Charley Siess; John Rawls; Lauryn Gould; Michael Dymowski; Shawn Jones; Christopher Cox; Dan Wells; Danny Lopez
- Website: theeasternsea.com

The Eastern Sea is an Indie rock band from Austin, Texas that originally started as a bedroom project by singer Matthew Hines and eventually morphed into a band. They have released two original full-length albums and a full-length Christmas album.

== Beginnings ==
Created in 2005 as the bedroom project of songwriter/vocalist Matthew Hines. From 2007 to 2009 the band added several new members and recorded what would eventually become The Eastern Sea, a self-released collection of two eponymous EPs. Songs such as “The Snow” and “The Name” attracted the band's first national press and led to several festival appearances. Originally The Eastern Sea consisted of revolving cast of musicians from Austin who joined the band whenever they had spare time similar to the Broken Social Scene. Eventually the band focused on creating a more consistent lineup but still feature regular guests and contributors. Many members of the band are alumni of Saint Edward's University.

== Albums ==
=== The Eastern Sea (debut album) ===
Originally created and released as two separate EPs, recorded and mixed by Adam Shell and Jess Hill at Good Citizen Recording in Austin, TX, (EP I and EP II) but would eventually be packaged together as one album. This album was re-released in late 2011.

=== Plague ===
Starting in 2010, The Eastern Sea began work on their first official LP, Plague. Plague was recorded live to tape by Matt Smith (Ola Podrida, Golden Bear) at HOTTRACKS!!! in Austin, Texas. During the recording the long-running East Austin studio, as the complex that housed HOTTRACKS!!! was condemned by the city only a month into production. The Eastern Sea was then forced to finish Plague in between temporary studios and homes across Central Texas battling several other issues including a major fire. The band has often said by naming the record Plague, it was doomed to failure.

Despite the numerous setbacks, the completed Plague (WhiteLabBlackLab), mastered by Jeff Lipton at Peerless Mastering (Bon Iver, Andrew Bird) was released on June 26, 2012. Eventually the album would become highly critically acclaimed and win several end of year honors including; #1 album of the year (OVRLD), and #13 best album of the year (The Wild Honey Pie).

=== First Christmas ===
In summer 2012, after the release of Plague the band recorded a full-length Christmas album engineered and co-produced by Louie Lino. The album includes 10 covers and 2 original songs "This is Christmas" and "First Christmas". It was released on the band's label WhitelabBlacklab on November 27, 2012.

=== The Witness ===
The Witness was released November 13, 2015.

== Festivals ==
In support of Plague, The Eastern Sea spent 2012 playing several festivals including Austin City Limits Festival, Houston Free Press Summer Festival, Index Festival and SXSW among others. In addition to festival appearances, they performed at several large outdoor concerts including KGSR's annual Blues on the Green in front of over 8,000 people.

== Discography ==
- EP 1 (No Longer in Print) (2008)
- EP 2 (No Longer in Print) (2010)
- The Eastern Sea (2011)
- Plague (2012)
- First Christmas (2012)
- The Witness (2015)
