= The Biscuit Brothers =

Television program

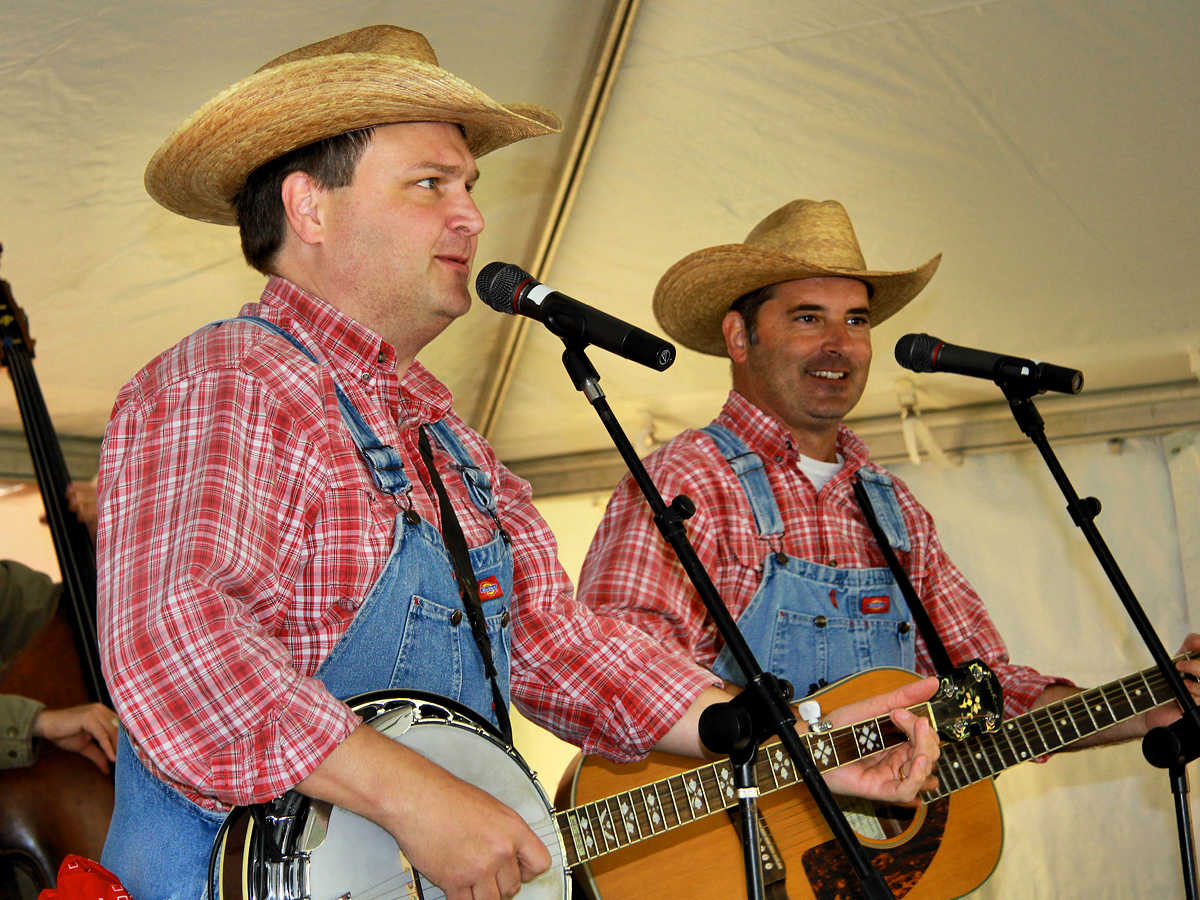
The Biscuit Brothers performing at the 2012 Texas Book Festival.

The Biscuit Brothers is a public television program produced in Austin, Texas. It was first aired on KLRU in 2004 and then aired nationwide in 2005. The program uses a mixture of live-action, puppetry, and animation to learn cultural communication through country music alongside folk music to children and their parents. It ceased airing on PBS in 2012.

The project was created and is produced by Allen Robertson, Jerome Schoolar, and Damon Brown. The program featured include "The Instrument of the Day" and "Crazy Classics".

The Biscuit Brothers have performed live in hundreds of venues across Texas as well, most notably at the Austin City Limits Music Festival (ACL Fest) in 2004, 2005, and 2006. They are the musical host of the annual Austin Family Music Festival, and have released several recordings, including Have a Merry Musical Christmas (2007).

The program starred Allen Robertson as "Buford Biscuit" (also music director), Jerome Schoolar as "Dusty Biscuit" (also producer), Jill Leberknight as "Buttermilk Biscuit" (also the field producer), Damon Brown as "Tiny Scarecrow" (also director), and Ian Scott as "Old MacDonald". Music icon Willie Nelson also contributed voice talent. The program often featured Austin musicians, nationally recognized US performers, as well as internationally recognized artists such as Evelyn Glennie.

The program was shot at Pioneer Farms in Austin, and the theater scenes were shot at the Scottish Rite Theater in Austin. The television program ended in 2012, but in 2014, the Biscuit Brothers performed at a benefit for a music scholarship fund in Lake Travis.
