= Qbeta =

Sicilian musical group

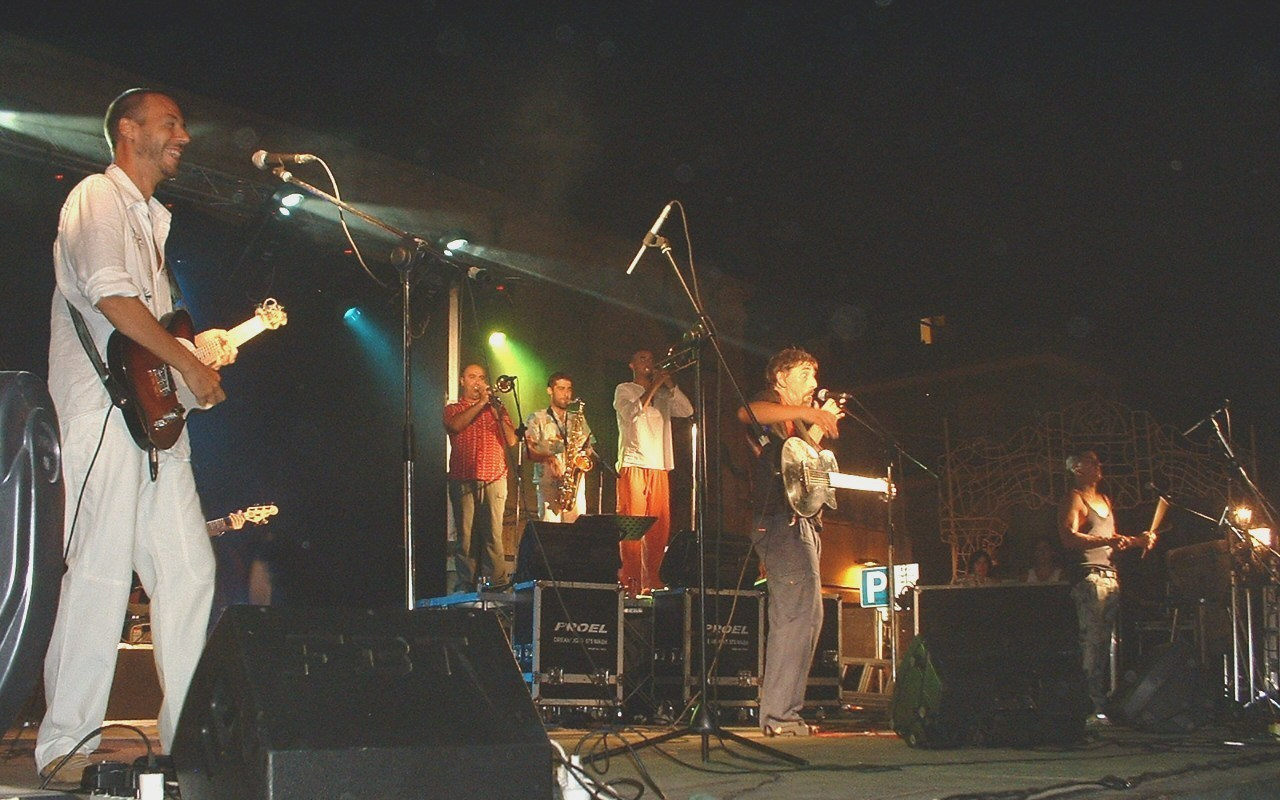
I Qbeta 'n cuncertu a San Pàulu pâ Festa dâ Birra 2008.

Qbeta is a Sicilian musical group.

== History ==
Qbeta was formed in Solarino, from musicians from a wide variety of musical traditions.

== Premi ==
The band was awarded the Premio Sicilia il Paladino.

== Discography ==
- Qbeta (1993)
- Arrivaru cuntraventu (1997)
- Arrakkè (2000)
- Indigeno (2004) with the sicilian songs: Hai comu, Kuturissi, Sovaiè, e Arrakkè.
