= Marie Hines =

American singer-songwriter

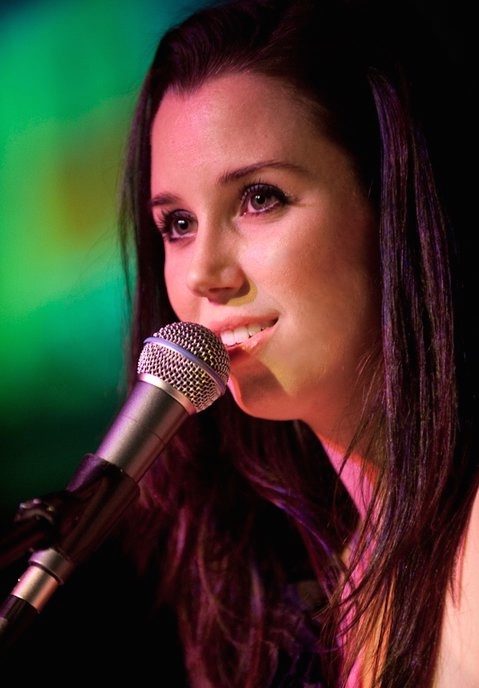
- Hines performing in Spartanburg, South Carolina, in 2011

Background information
- Born: Madonna Marie Hines; Charlotte, North Carolina
- Origin: Spartanburg, South Carolina
- Genres: Singer-songwriter
- Occupation(s): Musician, singer-songwriter
- Instrument: Piano
- Years active: 2009–present
- Labels: Independent
- Website: mariehines.com

Madonna Marie Hines is a Nashville-based indie pop singer-songwriter. She has released one studio album and six EPs since 2010. Her music is frequently used in wedding videos, television, ad campaigns, & films both nationally and internationally. Her musical style has been compared to Ingrid Michaelson, Norah Jones, Regina Spektor and Sara Bareilles.

== Biography ==
Hines was born in Charlotte, North Carolina. When she was young, her family moved to Spartanburg, South Carolina. She began taking classical piano lessons at the age of six, and by the age of twelve, she was writing her own songs. In 2005, Hines moved to Nashville to attend Belmont University where she studied commercial piano and commercial voice. In 2009, she graduated with a bachelor's degree in commercial voice. In 2013, Hines married fellow musician Ben Ringel of The Delta Saints, and they currently reside in Nashville.

== Musical career ==
Hines' albums Worth The Fight, The Living Room Sessions, HeartCrash, The Tide and The Sea, and Japanese Blossoms were produced by Eric Kinny, mixed and mixed by Craig Alvin (Erin McCarley, Hanson, The Features). They were recorded at Lookout Studio in Nashville. Hines' Endless EP was produced and mixed by Konrad Snyder (Kopecky), and was recorded at The Study in Nashville. All albums were mastered by Andrew Mendelson of Georgetown Mastering (Lady Antebellum, Kenny Chesney, Steven Curtis Chapman, Michael W. Smith, Casting Crowns).

"Long Way to Letting Go", "Perfect Kiss" and "My Love Will Never Fail You" have all been played on Nashville's independent radio station, Lightning 100, and in 2011, she played their free six-week concert series, Live on the Green, located in the heart of downtown Nashville. She has also frequently performed at Nashville's Musicians Corner in Centennial Park. Hines has opened for Brett Dennen, Drew Holcomb, Griffin House, Matt Wertz, K.S. Rhoads, Andrew Belle, Josh Jenkins (Green River Ordinance), Graham Colton, Ray Wylie Hubbard, Sandra McCracken, Rayland Baxter, and Andrew Combs.

Marie Hines' music has also been used in various retail locations, including Hallmark, Forever 21, Macaroni Grill and Delta Air Lines. Her music has been also featured in Spotify and iTunes. Following the album's release, Hines embarked on a national tour that included performances at Hotel Café in Los Angeles, The Living Room in New York City, and Bluebird Cafe in Nashville.

=== Placements ===
Hines' music has been featured in numerous advertising campaigns and has played a prominent role in Heinz Ketchup's Bring Food To Life international advertisement campaign (2014, 2015, and 2016), Eckrich Smoked Sausage's "Enjoy The Outdoors" campaign (2015), and Walmart's in-store promotional Valentine's Day campaign (2011 and 2012).

Her music has also been used in advertising campaigns by Swarovski, Ben & Jerry's, Samsung, Google, Comcast, Reed's Jewelers, Kashi, Google +, NUDE Skincare, Teach For America, Leroy Merlin, Cornell's Jewelry, Epson Europe, TIAA-CREF, Simon's Jewelry, plus thousands of wedding videos.

Hines' songs have been featured in the Season 2 opener of New York Med television show (ABC), Season 1 Episode 9 of ABC Family's The Fosters television show, and the Philippine's number one daytime television drama Be Careful with My Heart. MTV has featured her songs in Episode 402 of their television series Awkward and in Episode 411 of their television series 16 and Pregnant. Hines's songs have also been featured in two episodes of the Canadian television series Hello Goodbye that airs on CBC Television.

== Albums ==
=== Worth the Fight ===
Worth the Fight, Hines' first, full-length album, was released on December 7, 2010. In 2011, the title track won the Intel Superstars competition's Singer-Songwriter category, and the single "Wrapped Up in Love" was used in Walmart's Valentine's Day in-store promotional campaign in 2011 and 2012.

The song "Long Way to Letting Go" was used in 16 & Pregnant on MTV[17] and also won the Intel Video Superstars competition's Music Video category in 2012.[18]

=== The Living Room Sessions ===
The Living Room Sessions is a five-track live EP released on May 17, 2011. To record the album, Marie gathered a group of 27 of her good friends and fans for an audience and recorded a series of songs performed in her living room at her home in Nashville. The project was meant to provide fans with an experience like a concert in a living room, both visually and aurally. The song "Long Way to Letting Go" was used in 16 & Pregnant on MTV and also won the Intel Video Superstars competition's Music Video category in 2012.

=== HeartCrash ===
HeartCrash is a five-track EP released on February 28, 2012. The single's music video, "Perfect Kiss", was played on CMT Pure.

=== The Tide and the Sea ===
The Tide and the Sea, a five-track collection of love songs, was released on February 12, 2013. The EP includes co-writes with the Nashville singer-songwriter Justin Halpin and Justin Tam of the Nashville folk band Humming House. "Forever Mine" has background vocals by Ben Ringel of the Nashville blues rock band The Delta Saints.

=== Endless ===
Endless is a three-song EP released on June 9, 2015. Hines co-wrote the title track with her husband, Ben Ringel of The Delta Saints.

=== Japanese Blossoms ===
Japanese Blossoms, a five-song EP written with and produced by Eric Kinny, released on June 3, 2016.

Name	Type	Release date
Worth The Fight	LP	December 7, 2010
The Living Room Sessions	EP	May 17, 2011
Perfect Kiss	Single	January 24, 2012
HeartCrash	EP	February 28, 2012
My Love Will Never Fail You	Single	January 29, 2013
The Tide and The Sea	EP	February 12, 2013
Save It All	Single	August 1, 2013
The Tide and The Sea (Cinematic Versions)	EP	August 27, 2013
Perfect Kiss (Remix)	Single	February 11, 2014
Hold On	Single	February 24, 2015
Endless	EP	June 9, 2015
Japanese Blossoms	EP	June 3, 2016
