= Live on the Green Music Festival =

Outdoor music festival in Nashville, Tennessee, USA

Live On The Green Music Festival
- Genre: Variety
- Dates: 2–6 September 2021
- Location(s): Nashville, Tennessee, United States
- Years active: 2009 – present
- Founders: WRLT
- Attendance: 111,000 (2016)
- Website: http://www.liveonthegreen.com

Live On The Green (LOTG) is a free outdoor music festival in Nashville, Tennessee produced and presented by local radio station WRLT Lightning 100 that showcases the city's emerging musical talent and highlights well-known national acts. Since its first year in 2009, it has been held at Public Square Park in downtown Nashville adjacent to the historic Metropolitan Courthouse and attracts over 600,000 fans from all 50 states and 15 countries. It has been held every year except 2020 and 2021 when it was cancelled during the COVID-19 pandemic, in which the radio station instead hosted live performances and interviews with the artists. The festival hosts two stages showcasing the city's emerging musical talent and highlights well-known national acts, and also includes food trucks, vendors, and a VIP experience.

After a two-year hiatus due to the pandemic, Live on the Green is back! On June 15, 2022, Lightning 100 announced the festival will return Sept. 1- 5 at Public Square Park.

The festival has been ranked by local magazine the Nashville Scene as Best Event/Festival, Best Concert Series, Best Free Fun, Best Radio Station, and Best Cheap Date.

== History ==
Live On The Green was founded in 2009 by local radio station WRLT Lighting 100 as a celebration of music and community and has always been free to the public. Before LOTG, Nashville hosted free concert series such as Dancin in the District, Uptown Mix, and Summer Lights that didn't quite succeed. The event was initially intended as an opportunity for up-and-coming local Nashville artists to build a fanbase, but the concert series didn't receive much attention or profits in its early years. The radio station then began overlapping their programming with bands they booked for the festival, drawing in more crowds.

In 2012, Alabama Shakes took to the Main Stage and marked a turning point for the festival, doubling the average attendance in one night. Spoon then set the overall attendance record with what was estimated to be 20,000 fans in 2017. Now, Live On The Green draws in 100,000 fans each year and has expanded its footprint past Public Square Park and up Deaderick Street and 3rd Avenue, adding a second stage in 2015 called the "615 Stage" that hosts several local artists from in and around the Nashville area. The festival also features a local artist each year through an annual battle of the bands called Music City Mayhem. Since its inception, Live On The Green has grown into a music industry force that draws thousands of fans, brings in millions of dollars into the downtown economy, and even influences album release strategies for many artists and labels.

== Community ==
Lightning 100 has donated profits from the Live On The Green music festival to donorschoose.org which fully funded 35 projects, directly impacting nearly 5,000 students from high poverty Nashville schools. LOTG also raises awareness on important issues and invites select organizations to share messages and engage fans in positive ways at the festival. Live On The Green itself is also pet and children friendly.

== Sustainability ==
Live On The Green focuses heavily on eco-friendly solutions regarding the site and community. 54% of all waste generated at the festival is recycled each year, totaling to 79,680 lbs of material recycled since the concert series began in 2009. The Lightning 100 studio itself is a leading non-restaurant composter with Compost Nashville and the festival strives to be completely waste free in all upcoming seasons. In addition, all LOTG merchandise is made locally at the Friendly Arctic printmaking studio with high-quality eco-friendly materials and inks, and all t-shirts are 100% cotton.

LOTG also promotes biking, walking, taking public transportation, or carpooling to the festival. Partners at Walk/Bike Nashville offer a complimentary bike valet check at the festival, checking over 1,000 bikes for fans. There are also designated Lyft rideshare pick-up and drop-off locations on Deaderick Street and 4th Avenue and on James Robertson Pikeway.

== Notable performances ==
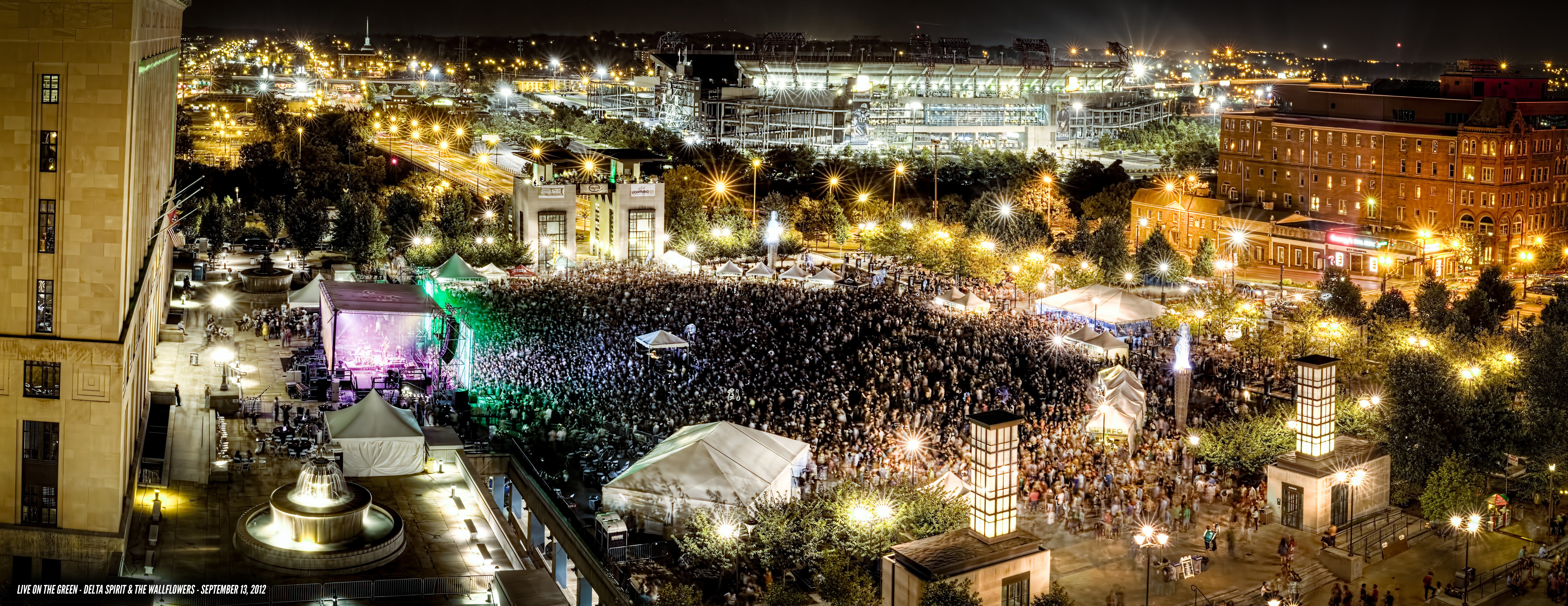
Live On The Green Music Festival, September 13, 2012

The festival has hosted more than 200 performing artists, including Ben Harper & the Innocent Criminals, Alabama Shakes, Spoon, Gary Clark Jr., Cage the Elephant, Sheryl Crow, Passion Pit, Portugal. The Man, Ben Folds, The Head and the Heart, Lord Huron, BØRNS, Rodrigo y Gabriela, Band of Horses, Cold War Kids, City and Colour, Young the Giant, Matt and Kim, Michael Franti & Spearhead, Matt Nathanson, Ingrid Michaelson, The Wallflowers, Citizen Cope and many more.

== 2020 Line-up ==
In 2020 Live On The Green shifted to an on-air format due to COVID-19. The Live On My Green FM Music Festival ran from September 3, 2020 to September 7, 2020 on 100.1 FM in Nashville. The event consisted of over 100 acts over five days and included pre-taped festival performances and exclusive content. The 2020 lineup included Bruce Springsteen, Metallica, My Morning Jacket, Jason Isbell, Beck, Sheryl Crow, and Moon Taxi, among many others.

== Past dates and artists ==
=== 2022 ===
The 2022 festival was the first in-person festival since 2019 and took place over Labor Day weekend, September 1-5, 2022.

Date	Artists
September 1, 2022	Sheryl Crow; Jenny Lewis; Nikki Lane; Danielle Ponder; Bre Kennedy; The Watson Twins; Cecilia Castleman
September 2, 2022	Moon Taxi; Colony House; The Wild Feathers; Seratones; The Foxies; The Shindellas; Sweet Lizzy Project
September 3, 2022	Santigold; Cautious Clay; Ruby Amanfu; The 502's *repeat repeat Amber Woodhouse; Los Colognes; Phillip-Michael Scales
September 4, 2022	Coin; Devon Gilfillian; Stephen Day Strung Like A Horse; The Criticals; Nordista Freeze; Tayls; Taylor Bickett
September 5, 2022	Yola; Arrested Development; Patrick Droney Susto; The Brummies; Daniel Donato's Cosmic Country; LadyCouch; Fulton Lee

=== 2020 ===
The 2020 season shifted to an on-air radio format, the "Live On My Green FM Music Festival", from September 3–6, 2020.

Date	Artists
September 3, 2020	Lindsay Ell; Katie Pruitt; Caitlyn Smith; The Heavy Hours; John Craigie; Jade Bird; Noah Cyrus beabadoobee Zack Heckendorf; Buzzard Buzzard Buzzard; Lianne La Havas; Humming House; The Mavericks; Matthew Logan Vasquez of Delta Spirit; Larkin Poe; Colony House; NEEDTOBREATHE; Hamilton Leithauser; Fruition; Trigger Hippy; Black Pumas; Jason Isbell; Nathaniel Rateliff and The Night Sweats; Amy Shark; The Foxies; Sylvan Esso; Milky Chance; Two Door Cinema Club; Overcoats
September 4, 2020	Joshua Speers; Lennon Stella; Frank Turner; Cold War Kids; Jill Andrews; Liza Anne; Joan Jett & The Blackhearts; Carolina Story; The Teskey Brothers; Molly Tuttle; Cordovas; Drew Holcomb and The Neighbors; Caamp; Hiss Golden Messenger; The Revivalists; Dr. Dog; Dawes; Mumford & Sons; Bruce Springsteen; Spoon; The Weeks; LP; G. Love; Cautious Clay; Tedeschi Trucks Band; The War and Treaty
September 5, 2020	Low Cut Connie; Will Hoge; Rhett Miller of Old 97's Ghost of Paul Revere; Kathleen Edwards; Courtney Marie Andrews; Nicole Atkins; Pete Yorn; Scott Mulvahill; Songhoy Blues; Amos Lee; Norah Jones; The Avett Brothers; Lilly Hiatt; Belle Mt. ZZ Ward; Jack Johnson & Friends; The Head & The Heart; Michael Kiwanuka; Beck; Cage The Elephant; Rainbow Kitten Surprise; My Morning Jacket; Metallica; Muse
September 6, 2020	Chuck Prophet; Brandy Clark; Bruce Hornsby; Smooth Hound Smith; Langhorne Slim; Sarah Jarosz; Aaron Lee Tasjan; Waxahatchee; Savannah Conley; U.S. Girls; Band of Horses; Phoebe Bridgers; Ruston Kelly; The Lone Bellow; Bailen; Okey Dokey; Ron Gallo; Briston Maroney; The Black Keys; Moon Taxi; The Aquaducks; Anderson East; St. Paul & The Broken Bones; The Marcus King Band; Bully; Margo Price; Josh Ritter; Eric Hutchinson
September 7, 2020	John-Robert; Stacey Randol; Charley Crockett; Jaime Wyatt; Band of Heathens; Ladycouch; Adia Victoria; Perfume Genius; Mondo Cozmo; Luthi; Devon Gilfillian; The Wood Brothers; Lake Street Dive; Sheryl Crow; Mt Joy; Molly Martin; Drumming Bird; James Ethan Clark & The Renegades; Catalina; Oddnote; Taylor Noelle; Fulton Lee; Foals; The National; Future Islands; Judah and the Lion; Michael Franti; Christone "Kingfish" Ingram; Half Moon Run

=== 2019 ===
The 2019 season started with two consecutive Thursdays from August 15–22, 2019 and ended with a weekend finale on August 29 - September 1, 2019.

Date	Artists
August 15, 2019	Lucie Silvas; Yola; The Strumbellas; Gary Clark Jr.
August 22. 2019	Will Hoge; Amanda Shires; Mat Kearney; Johnnyswim
August 29, 2019	Briston Maroney; The Daybreaks; Maggie Rose & Them Vibes; Morgxn; American Authors; Yacht Rock Revue; O.A.R
August 30, 2019	Los Colognes; The Brummies; Illiterate Lite; Robert Randolph and the Family Band; Guster; St. Paul and The Broken Bones
August 31, 2019	Kid's Fest; Wild Love; Laura Reed; Scott Mulvahill; Creature Comfort; Aaron Lee Tasjan; Bailen; Los Coast; Grizfolk; Jukebox The Ghost; Devon Gilfillian; Grace Potter
September 1, 2019	Trella; Forest Fire Gospel Choir; Airpark; Smooth Hound Smith; Stephen Day; Liz Cooper & The Stampede; Lindsay Ell; The Marcus King Band; Boy Named Banjo; Steve Earle; Wilder Woods; Lake Street Dive

=== 2018 ===
The 2018 season started with three consecutive Thursdays from August 9–23, 2018 and ended with a weekend finale on August 30 - September 1, 2018.

Date	Artists
August 9, 2018	Roscoe & Etta; Mt. Joy; The Wood Brothers; DISPATCH
August 16, 2018	*repeat repeat Colony House; Car Seat Headrest; Cold War Kids
August 23, 2018	Alanna Royale; Parquet Courts; Rainbow Kitten Surprise; Trampled by Turtles
August 30, 2018	The New Respects; Savannah Conley; Roots of a Rebellion; Rival Sons; The Wild Feathers; Dr. Dog
August 31, 2018	Waker; The Foxies; Republican Hair; Mikky Ekko; Theo Katzman; Elliot Root; X Ambassadors
September 1, 2018	Live On The Green's Kid's Fest with Mr. Steve; Jackson Bruck & The Dukes of Hume; Arlie; Paul McDonald; Luthi; Natalie Prass; Larkin Poe; Rayland Baxter; Lissie; ZZ Ward; Matt and Kim; Jimmy Eat World

=== 2017 ===
The 2017 season started with three consecutive Thursdays from August 10–24, 2017 and ended with a weekend finale on August 31 - September 2, 2017.

Date	Artists
August 10, 2017	Arkells; Michael Franti and Spearhead; St. Paul and the Broken Bones
August 17, 2017	Minus The Bear; Real Estate; Local Natives
August 24, 2017	The Weeks; Portugal. The Man; Spoon
August 31, 2017; Cancelled due to weather	Jonny P Carl Broemel; Roots of a Rebellion; Iron & Wine; DISPATCH; John Butler Trio
September 1, 2017; Cancelled due to weather, rescheduled to September 3, 2017	
September 2, 2017	Mr. Steve, the Music Man; Guthrie Brown; Cordovas; Paper Route; The Voodoo Fix; Elliot Root; Bahamas; The Delta Saints; The Record Company; LP; The Lone Bellow; Future Islands
September 3, 2017	The Whistles & The Bells; Ron Gallo; Goodbye June; SHEL; Drew Holcomb and the Neighbors; Sheryl Crow

=== 2016 ===
The 2016 season started with three consecutive Thursdays from August 11–25, 2016 and ended with a weekend finale from September 1–3, 2016.

Date	Artists
August 11, 2016	White Denim; Allen Stone; Andra Day
August 18, 2016	JR JR; Passenger; Jenny Lewis
August 25, 2016	The Record Company; Kurt Vile & the Violators; Dawes
September 1, 2016	*repeat repeat SIMO; COIN; The Revivalists; BØRNS; Young The Giant
September 2, 2016	Josh Farrow; Daniel Ellsworth & The Great Lakes; Nikki Lane the Sheepdogs; Rayland Baxter; The Wild Feathers; Band of Horses
September 3, 2016	Kid's Fest with Mr. Steve, the Music Man; Mountains Like Wax; Bassh; Alanna Royale; Los Colognes; Gabe Dixon; Aubrie Sellers; Elizabeth Cook; Bully; The Weeks; Judah & the Lion; Ben Harper & The Innocent Criminals

=== 2015 ===
The 2015 season started with three consecutive Thursdays from August 20 - September 3, 2015 and ended with a weekend finale from September 10–12, 2015.

Date	Artists
August 20, 2015	Elliot Root; Shakey Graves; Lord Huron
August 27, 2015	Houndmouth; J Roddy Walston and the Business; Cold War Kids
September 3, 2015	Greg Holden; The Delta Saints; Moon Taxi
September 10, 2015	Civil Twilight; Kopecky; Delta Rae; Humming House; JD McPherson; Rodrigo y Gabriela
September 11, 2015	Turbo Fruits; The Vespers; Colony House; Smooth Hound Smith; Zella Day; Big Data; Passion Pit
September 12, 2015	Mr Steve, The Music Man; Daphne and the Mystery Machines; Steelism; Future Thieves; Kaleo; All Them Witches; The Districts; Lennon & Maisy; Anderson East; Elle King; Family of the Year; Ben Folds

=== 2014 ===
The 2014 season started with three consecutive Thursdays from August 14–28, 2014 and ended with a weekend finale from September 4–6, 2014.

Date	Artists
August 14, 2014	Spanish Gold; The Weeks; City and Colour
August 21, 2014	Goodbye June; Wild Cub; The Head and the Heart
August 28, 2014	All Them Witches; The Features; Capital Cities
September 4, 2014	Johnnyswim; Delta Spirit; Cage the Elephant
September 5, 2014	Daniel Ellsworth & The Great Lakes; Augustana; G. Love & the Special Sauce; The Wild Feathers
September 6, 2014	Phin; Sugar and the Hi-Lows; Ingrid Michaelson; LP; The Lone Bellow; Jake Bugg

=== 2013 ===
The 2013 season consisted of six consecutive Thursdays from August 8 - September 12, 2013.

Date	Artists
August 8, 2013	Gin Wigmore; ZZ Ward; Matt & Kim
August 15, 2013	Erin McCarley; The Mowglis; Matt Nathanson
August 22, 2013	Luella & the Sun; The Delta Saints; Michael Franti & Spearhead
August 29, 2013	Joe Robinson; St. Paul & The Broken Bones; Robert Randolph & The Family Band
September 5, 2013	Lulu Mae; Leagues; Local Natives
September 12, 2013	The Wild Feathers; The Weeks; Moon Taxi

=== 2012 ===
The 2012 season consisted of six consecutive Thursdays from September 6 - October 11, 2012.

Date	Artists
September 6, 2012	Jon Cleary; Moon Taxi; Dr. John
September 13, 2012	The Dunwells; Delta Spirit; The Wallflowers
September 20, 2012	Roots of a Rebellion; Missing Cats featuring John "JoJo" Hermann & Sherman Ewing; North Mississippi Allstars
September 27, 2012	Fly Golden Eagle; The Apache Relay; Alabama Shakes
October 4, 2012	HoneyHoney; The Kingston Springs; Trampled by Turtles
October 11, 2012	The Delta Saints; Yacht Rock Revue; Here Come the Mummies

=== 2011 ===
The 2011 season consisted of six consecutive Thursdays from September 8 - October 13, 2011.

Date	Artists
September 8, 2011	Chris Bailey; Will Hoge; Nashville Symphony with K.S. Rhoads
September 15, 2011	The Kicks; Rumba; Los Lonely Boys
September 22, 2011	Moon Taxi; The Dirty Guv'nahs; Robert Randolph & The Family Band
September 29, 2011	The Spinderellas; Carey Ott; Edwin McCain; Ten Out of Tenn
October 6, 2011	Marie Hines; Rayland Baxter; Drew Holcomb & The Neighbors; Brett Dennen
October 13, 2011	Eastern Block; H-BEAM; Here Come the Mummies

=== 2010 ===
Date	Artists
September 9, 2010	Hightide Blues; Five for Fighting; Tonic
September 16, 2010	The Apache Relay; Glossary; Dr. Dog
September 23, 2010	Joe Robinson; Moon Taxi; The Wailers
September 30, 2010	Garrison Starr; Sixpence None the Richer; Jars of Clay
October 7, 2010	Bryan Cates; Ghostfinger; Band of Horses
October 14, 2010	Johnathon Tyler & The Northern Lights; Ivan Neville's Dumpstaphunk; JJ Grey & Mofro

=== 2009 ===
Date	Artists
September 3, 2009	Ten Out of Tenn; American Bang; The Toadies
September 10, 2009	H-BEAM; Space Capone; Here Come the Mummies
September 17, 2009	Homemade Water; Jack Pearson; Derek Trucks Band
September 24, 2009	Thadd Cockrell; Matthew Perryman Jones; Dave Barnes
October 1, 2009	Maureen Murphy; The Dynamites; Sharon Jones & The Dap-Kings
October 8, 2009	Next Big Nashville; Ricky Young; Citizen Cope
