= Andrew Belle =

American singer-songwriter (born 1984)

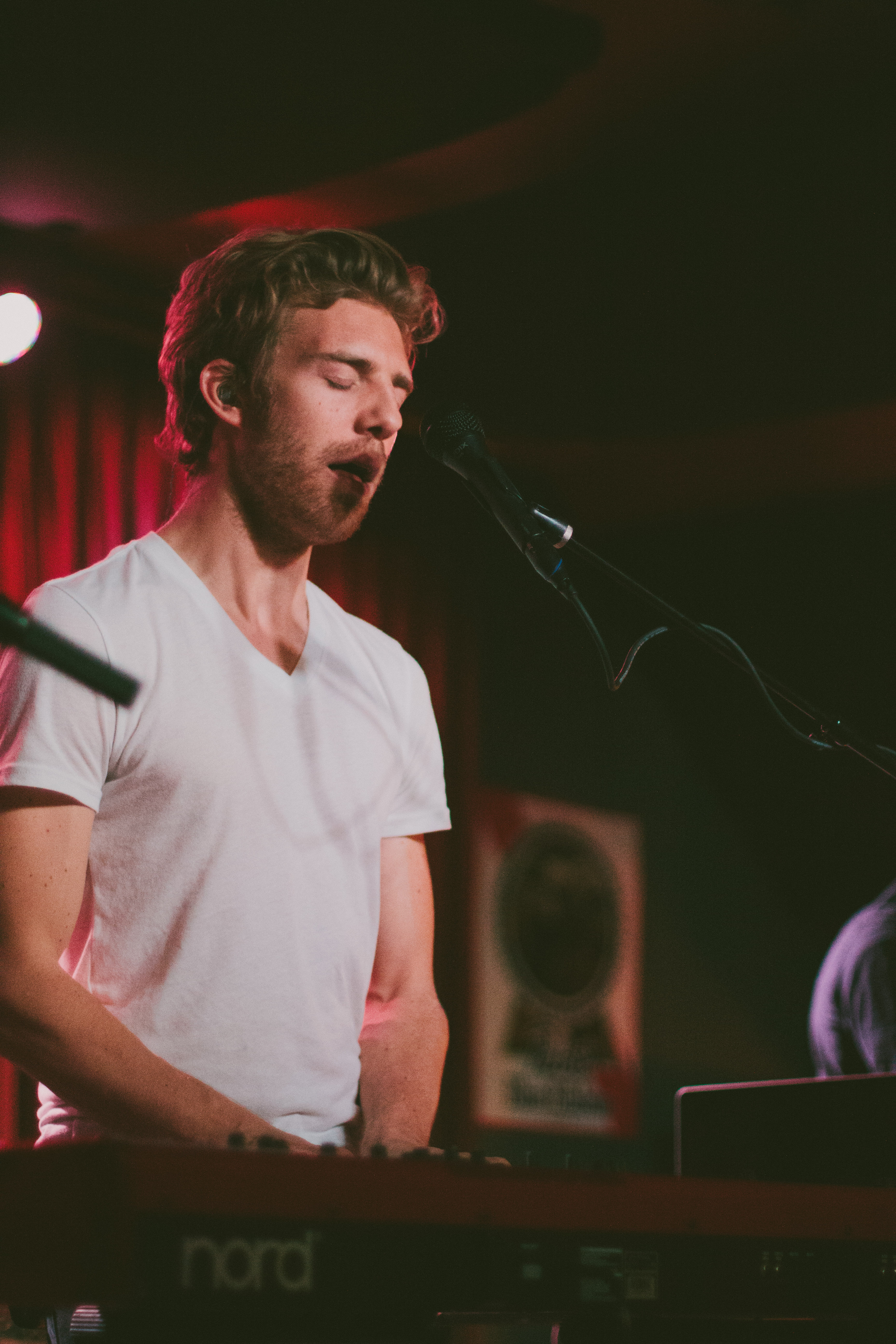
- Belle performing at the Gramophone in St. Louis, October 2013

Background information
- Born: August 26, 1984 (age 41); Winfield, Illinois, U.S.
- Origin: United States
- Genres: Alternative rock; singer-songwriter; indie folk; indie pop
- Occupations: Singer; songwriter
- Instruments: Vocals; acoustic guitar; keyboard (piano)
- Years active: 2008–present
- Website: andrewbelle.com

Andrew Belle is an American singer-songwriter. In recent years he has lived in Nashville and Los Angeles and lives in Chicago. He has toured alongside many artists including Mat Kearney, Ben Rector, Allen Stone, The Milk Carton Kids, Joshua Radin, Brett Dennen, Leagues, and Diane Birch. Belle is also a member of Ten Out of Tenn, a critically acclaimed songwriter collective.

== Career ==
=== 2008–2009: Beginnings and All Those Pretty Lights EP ===
Soon after graduating from college, Belle began performing in bars and small clubs around his hometown of Chicago such as Schubas Tavern and SPACE in Evanston. In September 2008, he released his debut EP All Those Pretty Lights.

=== 2010–2012: In My Veins, The Ladder, and The Daylight EP ===
In February 2010, Belle released his debut full-length album The Ladder and had immediate success. His songs began to be regularly featured on television shows including Grey's Anatomy, Castle, Pretty Little Liars, One Tree Hill, and The Vampire Diaries. In May 2010, he released a b-side single from The Ladder recording sessions entitled "In My Veins (featuring Erin McCarley)" which was played during an iconic scene of the Grey's Anatomy season six finale. It generated more than 100 million streams and downloads of the "In My Veins" single worldwide. The song was also used in the culminating scene of the season four finale of Castle in 2012 and in one of the ending scenes of the show Cold Case on CBS. It was used in season six of Castle and during the wedding of two main characters in season seven of the show.

Belle began touring nationally as a member of Ten Out of Tenn alongside the other members, Joy Williams, Mikky Ekko, Ashley Monroe, Trent Dabbs, Katie Herzig, Erin McCarley, K.S. Rhoads, Madi Diaz, Matthew Perryman Jones, Butterfly Boucher, Gabe Dixon, Tyler James, Sarah Siskind, and Griffin House. Then, Belle's song "Sky's Still Blue" was featured in a Microsoft commercial promoting the Windows Phone 7. It was made available as a free download from Microsoft. The track was later included on an EP entitled The Daylight which was released in February 2012.

=== 2013–2015: Black Bear ===
On his second full-length album Black Bear, Belle wrote songs which are autobiographical with themes ranging from wrestling with God to restoring personal relationships. The album consists of ambitious, ambient songs with influences from M83, Beach House, James Blake, and Washed Out. He said, "I began to feel limited by my original, predominately acoustic sound... and as my creative taste began to change, I decided to take things in a new direction; writing songs that made me excited about music again". Black Bear came out in August 2013 and was produced in Norman, Oklahoma by Chad Copelin. Belle told USA Today that he wrote the album's first single "Pieces" for his wife shortly after they married in 2012.

In the fall of 2014, Belle released an EP entitled Black Bear (Hushed), featuring stripped down versions of five of the album's tracks. It included a remix of the song "Black Bear" by artist and producer Shallou.

=== 2016–2018: Dive Deep ===
In August 2016, Belle released "Dive Deep" as the lead single from his upcoming third album of the same name. A follow-up single, "You", was put out in October 2016 followed by 3 more singles, "Down", "Honey and Milk", and "When the End Comes". His third full-length album Dive Deep was released on August 25, 2017. Similar to Black Bear, it was recorded in Norman with Copelin producing and debuted on the Billboard Heatseekers Albums chart at position No. 8, after which Belle embarked on a nearly sold out headline tour of the U.S.

In the fall of 2018, Belle released an EP entitled Dive Deep (Hushed), featuring stripped down versions of five of the album's tracks, similar to the Black Bear (Hushed) EP released in 2014. In winter of 2018 he supported Mat Kearney on his Crazytalk U.S tour alongside Austrian artist and producer Filous.

=== 2021: Nightshade ===
On June 11, Belle released the first single "My Poor Heart" from the upcoming album Nightshade. He released the second single "Spectrum" on July 10 and the third single "Nightshade" on July 30. The album Nightshade followed on August 20.

== Personal life ==
Andrew Belle grew up in Wheaton, Illinois and graduated from Taylor University in Upland, Indiana in 2006. He lives in Chicago with his wife and children.

== Discography ==
=== Studio albums ===
- The Ladder (2010)
- Black Bear (2013)
- Dive Deep (2017)
- Nightshade (2021)

=== EPs ===
- All Those Pretty Lights (2008)
- The Daylight (2012)
- Black Bear (Hushed) (2014)
- Dive Deep (Hushed) (2018)

=== Singles ===
- Back for Christmas (2016)
- Fade into You (2018)
- If I Knew How to Hold You (2020)
- To Be Alone (2020)
- Whatever Happened to Christmas (2020)

== Awards and nominations ==
Year	Organisation	Award	Nominated work	Result	Ref
2009	MTV Video Music Award	Chicago Breakout Artist of the Year	Himself	Won	
