= Jeff Wyatt Wilson =

American film director, screenwriter and producer

- Born: Jeff Wyatt Wilson; Nashville, Tennessee
- Occupation: Filmmaker
- Years active: 1996–present

Jeff Wyatt Wilson is an American film director, screenwriter and producer based out of Nashville, Tennessee.

Wilson has worked in film and TV productions such as Breakfast with Einstein and Krippendorf's Tribe with various networks from Showtime (the Holocaust Series) to Nickelodeon (And Now This…), CMT and MTV as well as independent projects including Gummo directed by Harmony Korine and the feature documentary "Any Day Now" under Wilson's direction that followed the American Songwriter and (BMI) Broadcast Music, Inc. sponsored Ten Out of Tenn Tour which premiered and was 1st runner-up at the Nashville Film Festival.

== Filmography ==
=== Directorial work ===
Year	Title	Also credited as			Notes
Year	Title	Producer	Writer	Other	Notes
2009	Matchstick Murder Tristen	Yes	Yes	Yes ^{[I]}^{[II]}	Music Video
2009	Any Day Now	Yes	Yes	Yes ^{[I]}^{[II]}	Feature Documentary
2010	The Woman for Me ft. Rayland Baxter	Yes	Yes	Yes ^{[I]}^{[II]}	Music Video
2010	Amelia ft. Matthew Perryman Jones	Yes	Yes	Yes ^{[I]}^{[II]}	Music Video
2010	Bodega Rose ft. Kesang Marstrand	Yes	Yes	Yes ^{[I]}^{[II]}	Music Video
2010	"Pocket Full of Hope ft. Gin Cooley"	Yes	Yes	Yes^{[I]}^{[II]}	Music Video
2011	The Great Unknown	—N/a	—N/a	Yes ^{[I]}^{[II]}	Documentary
2012	The Spell I'm Under ft. Kesang Marstrand	Yes	Yes	Yes ^{[I]}^{[II]}	Music Video
2013	Orphaned ft. KS Rhoads	Yes	Yes	Yes ^{[I]}^{[II]}	Music Video
2013	Blue Jeans	Yes	Yes	Yes ^{[I]}^{[II]}	TV mini series
2015	"Oval Room ft. Gin Cooley"	Yes	Yes	Yes^{[I]}^{[II]}	Music Video

I Credited as editor
II Credited as cinematographer
