= Tyler James (American musician) =

American singer-songwriter (born 1982)

- Born: Tyler James Geertsma; March 31, 1982 (age 44); Mount Vernon, Washington, US
- Origin: Nashville, Tennessee
- Genres: Soul, pop, indie, folk, classic rock, gospel
- Instruments: Piano, trumpet, guitar, bass, drums
- Years active: 2004 – present
- Labels: Nettwerk, Son of Geert Records
- Website: www.tylerjames.com

Tyler James Geertsma (born March 31, 1982) is an American singer/songwriter based in Nashville, Tennessee. He is best known for his work as a solo recording artist and as keyboardist in Edward Sharpe and the Magnetic Zeros.

== Early life ==
James was born Tyler James Geertsma just north of Seattle in Mount Vernon, Washington, in 1982. His father is a teacher and his mother an adoption social worker. They raised Tyler and three siblings in the small Midwest town of Orange City, Iowa. He began studying piano and trumpet at a young age and later picked up the guitar from his mom. He spent his last year of high school in Holland, Michigan, before moving to Nashville in 2000 to study and pursue music. Tyler enrolled at Belmont University as a music business major and worked part-time jobs like meter-reading, pizza delivery, valet, landscaping, and in a retirement home. He used the school's recording studios to make demos and interned at record labels and artist management firms before graduating in 2004.

== Career ==
In 2005, Tyler teamed with producer Jason Lehning (Guster, David Mead) and released his first EP aptly entitled "An EP". Tyler followed that release with his first national tour, traveling solo in an old Volkswagen Golf. That same year, he joined nine other Nashville singer/songwriters in forming "Ten Out of Tenn", an artist collective aimed at bringing attention to Nashville's non-country music scene. The group consists of Griffin House, Matthew Perryman Jones, Tyler James, Butterfly Boucher, K.S. Rhoads, Trent Dabbs, Katie Herzig, Jeremy Lister, Andy Davis, and Erin McCarley. Ten Out of Tenn. Vol. 1 was released in 2005 and featured Tyler's song "Stay Humble". Ten Out of Tenn partnered with Myspace and Paste magazine for an extensive national tour which began in April 2005. In March 2006, Tyler was recognized by Paste as "Artist of the Week". In the article, Tyler cites his move to Nashville as "the best thing that could have happened to me, musically and spiritually." He goes on to say, "I'm supposed to be here."

In 2007, Tyler and Leigh Nash sang a duet for the Bridge to Terabithia soundtrack; the song was entitled "A Place for Us". In August 2007, Tyler released his second EP, titled Sweet Relief. The release contained four tracks described as "a more complex sound, indicating grander ambitions (and resources)." Also in 2007, Tyler's music was featured on MTV's hit show The Hills, and ABC's Brothers and Sisters. In 2008, Ten Out of Tenn. released their second compilation album, Ten Out of Tenn. Vol. 2. featuring Tyler's song "Down to the Garden". The group embarked on four national tours between the summer of 2008 and winter of 2009.

In 2008, breaking from his usual style of music, Tyler collaborated with Los Angeles–based DJ Morgan Page on the song "Call My Name". According to Page, "It's a bit of a sentimental song, but I think it does a good job of straddling the lines of pop and electronic music." The single hit number 1 on Billboard's Heatseekers charts in September 2008.

On March 2, 2010, Tyler released his first full-length album, It Took the Fire, on his own Son of Geert Records. The album contains twelve tracks and was recorded at House of David Studios on Music Row in Nashville.

In early 2010, Tyler began touring as a member of the Los Angeles–based band Edward Sharpe and the Magnetic Zeros while continuing to venture out as a solo artist. The band recently completed an Australian tour as well as an extensive summer tour that included festival performances at Coachella, Bonnaroo, Sasquatch!, Telluride Bluegrass Festival, Newport Folk Festival, and Lollapalooza. Their first full-length recording, Up from Below, was released July 7, 2009, digitally and July 14, 2009, physically on Vagrant Records.

In November 2011, Tyler went into the studio with Jessica Maros, a fashion designer from Tennessee. They recorded their first album, The Ghost of Escondido, in a single day, under the name Escondido. They debuted later that month at the Mercy Lounge in Nashville. Their album was released in February 2013.

Tyler has toured with several artists, including Denison Witmer, Diane Birch, The Autumn Defense, Mat Kearney, Pico vs. Island Trees, Paper Route, Morgan Wade, and Edward Sharpe and the Magnetic Zeros.

== Discography ==
=== Album ===
Year	Title	Label
2010	It Took the Fire	Son of Geert Records

=== EPs ===
Year	Title	Label
2005	An EP	Independent
2007	Sweet Relief EP	Independent

=== Compilation appearances ===
Year	Album title	Track	Label
2005	Ten Out of Tenn Vol. 1	"Stay Humble"	Ready Set Records
2007	Bridge to Terabithia Soundtrack	"A Place for Us" with Leigh Nash	Hollywood Records
2007	Ten Out of Tenn Vol. 2	"Down to the Garden"	Ready Set Records
2008	Elevate	"Call My Name"	Nettwerk Records
2008	Ten Out of Tenn Christmas	"Sentimental Christmas"	Ready Set Records
