= Ten Out of Tenn =

- Origin: Nashville, Tennessee
- Years active: 2005–present
- Members: See below
- Website: www.10outoftenn.com

Ten Out of Tenn is a collective of singer-songwriters from Nashville, Tennessee, founded in 2005 by Kristen and Trent Dabbs. The collective has released multiple volumes, including a Christmas album (Ten Out of Tenn Christmas) and a benefit album for the 2010 Tennessee flood victims (We Are All In This Together).

The group's 2008 tour is the subject of the documentary film Any Day Now (2009) by filmmaker Jeff Wyatt Wilson, record producer Charlie Peacock and executive producer Kristen Dabbs.

All ten artists share the stage at once, taking turns in the spotlight and playing each other's songs.

== Members ==
Current
- Andrew Belle
- Butterfly Boucher
- Trent Dabbs
- Gabe Dixon
- Katie Herzig
- Tyler James
- Jeremy Lister
- Matthew Perryman Jones
- K.S. Rhoads
- Will Sayles
- Amy Stroup
Former
- Kyle Andrews
- Kristen Dabbs
- Joy Williams
- Andy Davis
- Disappointed by Candy
- Griffin House
- Mikky Ekko
- The Golden Sounds
- Jedd Hughes
- Mat Kearney
- The Lonelyhearts
- Erin McCarley
- Ashley Monroe
- Paper Route
- Betsy Roo
- Shortwave Radio
- Sarah Siskind
- Kate York

== Discography ==
Ten Out of Tenn Compilation (Vol. 1) (2005)

1. "Passive Aggressive" by The Lonelyhearts
2. "Wished For Song" by Kate York
3. "Second Chances" by Paper Route
4. "Cardiac" by ShortwaveRadio
5. "Feeling I've Got" by Disappointed By Candy
6. "Versus" by Trent Dabbs
7. "Turn It Around" by Betsy Roo
8. "Stay Humble" by Tyler James
9. "Lay Down In Your Fields" by Griffin House
10. "Whistles And Windchimes" by The Golden Sounds

Ten Out of Tenn Compilation (Vol. 2) (2008)

1. "Pony" by Erin McCarley
2. "Don't Fall In Love" by Matthew Perryman Jones
3. "The Guy That Says Goodbye To You Is Out Of His Mind" by Griffin House
4. "Hologram" by Katie Herzig
5. "Helpless State" by Trent Dabbs
6. "Beautiful Day For Bad News" by Andy Davis
7. "All Of The Things" by Butterfly Boucher
8. "Fit" by Jeremy Lister
9. "Dark Hotel" by Kevin S. Rhoads
10. "Down To The Garden" by Tyler James

Ten Out of Tenn Christmas (2008)

1. "Cinnamon & Chocolate" by Butterfly Boucher
2. "O Holy Night" by Griffin House
3. "Santa's Lost His Mojo" by Jeremy Lister
4. "Raise The Tree" by Trent Dabbs
5. "Silent Night" by Katie Herzig
6. "Why Are Mom and Daddy Fighting On Christmas" by K.S. Rhoads
7. "Little Drummer Boy" by Erin McCarley
8. "Christmas Time" by Andy Davis
9. "Sentimental Christmas" by Tyler James
10. "O Come, O Come Emmanuel" by Matthew Perryman Jones

Any Day Now (2009, DVD)

With: Griffin House, Matthew Perryman Jones, Katie Herzig, Trent Dabbs, Erin McCarley, Andy Davis, Butterfly Boucher, Tyler James, Jeremy Lister, Jeremy Lister, K.S. Rhoads & Will Sayles.

Ten Out of Tenn, Volume 3 (2009)

1. "Sushi" by Kyle Andrews
2. "Let's Go" by Madi Diaz
3. "Static Waves" by Andrew Belle (feat. Katie Herzig)
4. "It's Only You" by Mikky Ekko
5. "Charmed Life" by Joy Williams
6. "Could This Be Love" by K.S. Rhoads
7. "Has Anybody Ever Told You" by Ashley Monroe
8. "Your Side Now" by Trent Dabbs
9. "Falling Stars" by Sarah Siskind
10. "I Only Ever Tried" by Jedd Hughes

We Are All In This Together (2010)

1. "We're All In This Together" by Katie Herzig
2. "Machine Gun Love" by Matthew Perryman Jones
3. "One Light Wondering" by Trent Dabbs
4. "Let's Jump" by Joy Williams
5. "In My Veins" by Andrew Belle
6. "A Little Bit" by Madi Diaz
7. "Missed My Chance" by Griffin House
8. "Electrocution and Laughter" by Jeremy Lister
9. "As Youth" by Tyler James
10. "Gift Wrap" by Butterfly Boucher

Ten Out of Tenn Compilation (Vol. 4) (2011)

1. "Where I Come From" by K.S. Rhoads
2. "Free My Mind" by Katie Herzig
3. "The Ladder" by Andrew Belle
4. "Not Foolin' Around Tonight" by Butterfly Boucher
5. "On a Day Just Like Today" by Gabe Dixon
6. "Leave to See" by Trent Dabbs
7. "The Only One" by Tyler James
8. "Just You" by Amy Stroup
9. "Home" by Matthew Perryman Jones
10. "The Bed You Made" by Jeremy Lister

== Sources ==
- "Nashville Collective Ten Out Of Tenn Continue US Tour Into 2009". Plug In Music. January 22, 2009.
- Waters, B. (August 11, 2009). "Ten Out of Tenn". Live On the Green. Tuned In Broadcasting. Archived from the original on 2009-08-21.
- "Ten Out Of Tenn". Events. AV Club. 2009. Archived from the original on 2009-10-28.
- Zaleski, Annie (December 8, 2009). "Ten Out of Tenn Christmas Tour". Music. Riverfront Times.
