= Gin Cooley =

American singer

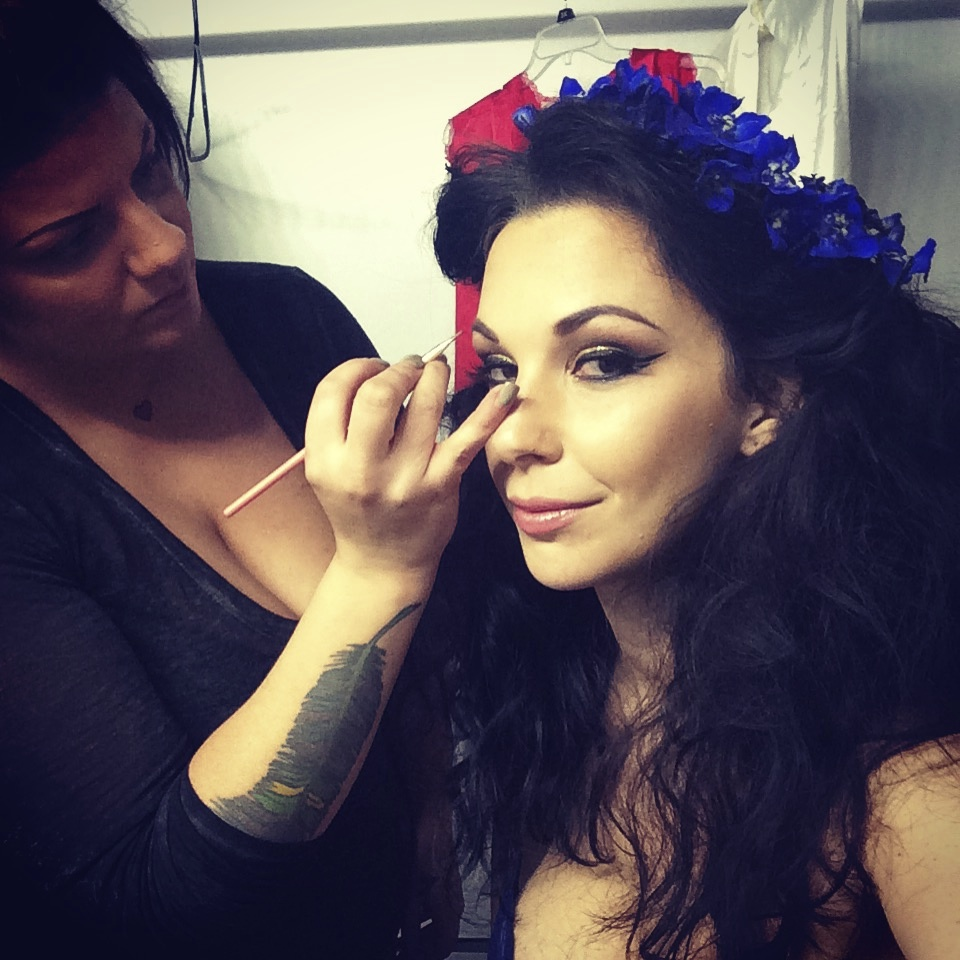
- Gin Cooley in hair and makeup
- Born: Paris, Tennessee, U.S.
- Education: University of Tennessee at Martin; Bethel University (Tennessee)
- Occupation: Model
- Modeling information
- Height: 5 ft 10 in (1.78 m)
- Hair color: Varies/Naturally Dark Blonde
- Eye color: Brown
- Website: https://www.gincooley.com/

Jennifer "Gin" Cooley is an American model, psychotherapist, composer and vocalist. Cooley has appeared in several popular music videos, including cameos for Casey James’ "Let's Don't Call it a Night" Rodney Atkins’ "Take a Back Road,"; Joe Nichols’ "Take It Off"; Jason Aldean's "Take a Little Ride" and landed the lead role for Lady Antebellum’s hit song "Wanted You More."

Her music video, "Pocket Full of Hope" was an Official Selection and "Royal Reel Award" winner at the 2013 Canada International Film Festival in Vancouver, Canada.

== Early life and education ==
Gin is a native of Paris, Tennessee and is the daughter of Tammy Muench. She graduated high school at 16 from Gateway Christian Academy and attended Murray State University where she studied Fine Art but suspended her studies to focus on her modeling career. She received a Bachelor of Science in Business and Organizational Management magna cum laude from Bethel University (Tennessee) as well as a master's degree in Psychology with a focus in Clinical Mental Health from the University of Tennessee at Martin. In 2019, Gin was accepted into the Doctor of Psychology program at Western Kentucky University, with focus in applied psychology.

== Modeling career ==
=== 2002–present ===
Cooley started her modeling career at 16, signing with BMG Chicago. Two months later she dropped BMG and signed with industry expert and manager, the late JJ Cortez in New York City. At 17, she signed with Elite Model Management Singapore, which launched her international career. She walked for Christian Dior's "Hardcore" show not even 3 months on the scene. She was represented by LookNow in Milan, Italy and later signed with Riccardo Gay walking in Milan Fashion Week seasons 2003, 2004 and 2005. She also had representation in Shanghai, China (ENVY Models), Taipei, Taiwan (FMI) and New York City (Women Management). She resided in Italy during the height of her fashion career and worked exclusively in the European market until her return to the United States. Gin appeared in various editorials for designers including Gucci, Prada, Miu Miu, Alexander McQueen, Donna Karan, Christian Dior, Louis Vuitton, Issey Miyake, Armani and Chanel. From 2009 to 2016 she was based out of Nashville, Tennessee with Wilhelmina Models/Dan Agency and was a featured cameo in several top country music video hits.

== Filmography ==
=== Music videos ===
Year	Title	Artist	Role
2015	Jacked Up (Remix)	Charlie Farley, Colt Ford Bubba Sparxxx	Bad Girl
2015	There's a Party Going on	Duke Boyz ft. Mikel Knight, JellyRoll and Kool Whip	Herself
2014	Home Sweet Home	Justin Moore ft. Vince Neil	Herself
2014	Tennessee Honey	Babi Mac	Herself
2012	Wanted You More	Lady Antebellum	Girlfriend
2012	Take a Little Ride	Jason Aldean	Herself
2012	"Let's Don't Call it a Night"	Casey James	Herself taking a bath
2011	"Take it Off"	Joe Nichols	Herself
2011	"Take a Back Road"	Rodney Atkins	Bass Player
2011	"Finally Free"	Micah Brown	Herself

== Film Festivals ==
=== Premieres and screenings ===
"Pocket Full of Hope" is a music video for a song that Gin composed and produced herself with the most nominal, obsolete equipment in rural West Tennessee. It is directed by indie film maker Jeff Wyatt Wilson and was an Official Selection and "Royal Reel Award" winner at the 2013 Canada International Film Festival in Vancouver, Canada. Gin plays herself in the video."Pocket Full of Hope" also screened as an Official Selection at the 2013 Memphis International Film and Music Festival at Purple Haze on Beale Street in Memphis, Tennessee.

"Oval Room" is a musical short which Cooley co-directed by Jeff Wyatt Wilson, world premiered at the 2015 Mykonos Biennale on July 4 in Mykonos, Greece. Gin recorded and produced the song herself with "yardsale electronics" in rural West Tennessee. "Oval Room" was originally written by Blaze Foley. She plays herself in the video. "Oval Room"'s Canadian premier was held on September 10 at the 2015 Toronto Independent Film Festival at the Carlton Cinema in Toronto, Canada. The U.S. premiere of "Oval Room" took place at the Harlem International Film Festival on September 12, 2015 at the Maysles Cinema in New York City. Oval Room screened at the San Pedro International Film Festival on October 11, 2015 in San Pedro, Los Angeles at the legendary Warner Grand Theatre. In February 2016, "Oval Room" was an Official Selection in the Honorable Mentioned category at the 11th Annual Socal Film Festival in Huntington Beach, California.

== Discography ==
Title	Release	Label	Band
Breathing to the Rhythm feat. Gin Cooley	2011	Abstract Logic Recordings	Charlie P.
Dollar Signs feat. Gin Cooley	2018	CMCP	Ya Boi Fade
Sad Song Sunday: Veneration	2018	Gin Cooley	Gin Cooley
Fire Burning feat. Gin Cooley (single)	2019	Smith Avenue Music	Jaaz
Gin (EP)	2020	Gin Cooley	Gin Cooley
Death of a friend	2020	Gin Cooley	Gin Cooley
You Know Me	2020	Gin Cooley	Gin Cooley
Unattainable (single)	2020	Gin Cooley	Gin Cooley
Paramour	2020	Gin Cooley	Gin Cooley
Grow	2020	Gin Cooley	Gin Cooley
Wolf (single)	2020	Gin Cooley	Gin Cooley
Wolf (Matiso Full Feeling Remix)	2020	Wechselstrom Music	Gin Cooley
Peace and Serenity feat. Gin Cooley (single)	2020	Smith Avenue Music	Jaaz
Death Before Dishonor (single)	2021	Gin Cooley	Gin Cooley
Pride (single)	2021	Gin Cooley	Gin Cooley
War March feat. Bjorth (single)	2021	Gin Cooley	Gin Cooley
Wanderer	2021	Hoppenfield Traxx	Bjorth

== Awards and nominations ==
Year	Type	Award	Result
2013	Canada International Film Festival	Royal Reel Award	Won

== Philanthropy ==
In 2016, Gin founded a child advocacy group "Gin Cooley's Fine Art Revival" which consists of a celebration and collaboration of visual arts through fine and expressive art mediums to raise funds, awareness and provide information to victims of child abuse, children in high risk situations and various children's charities.
