= SIMO (band) =

American rock band

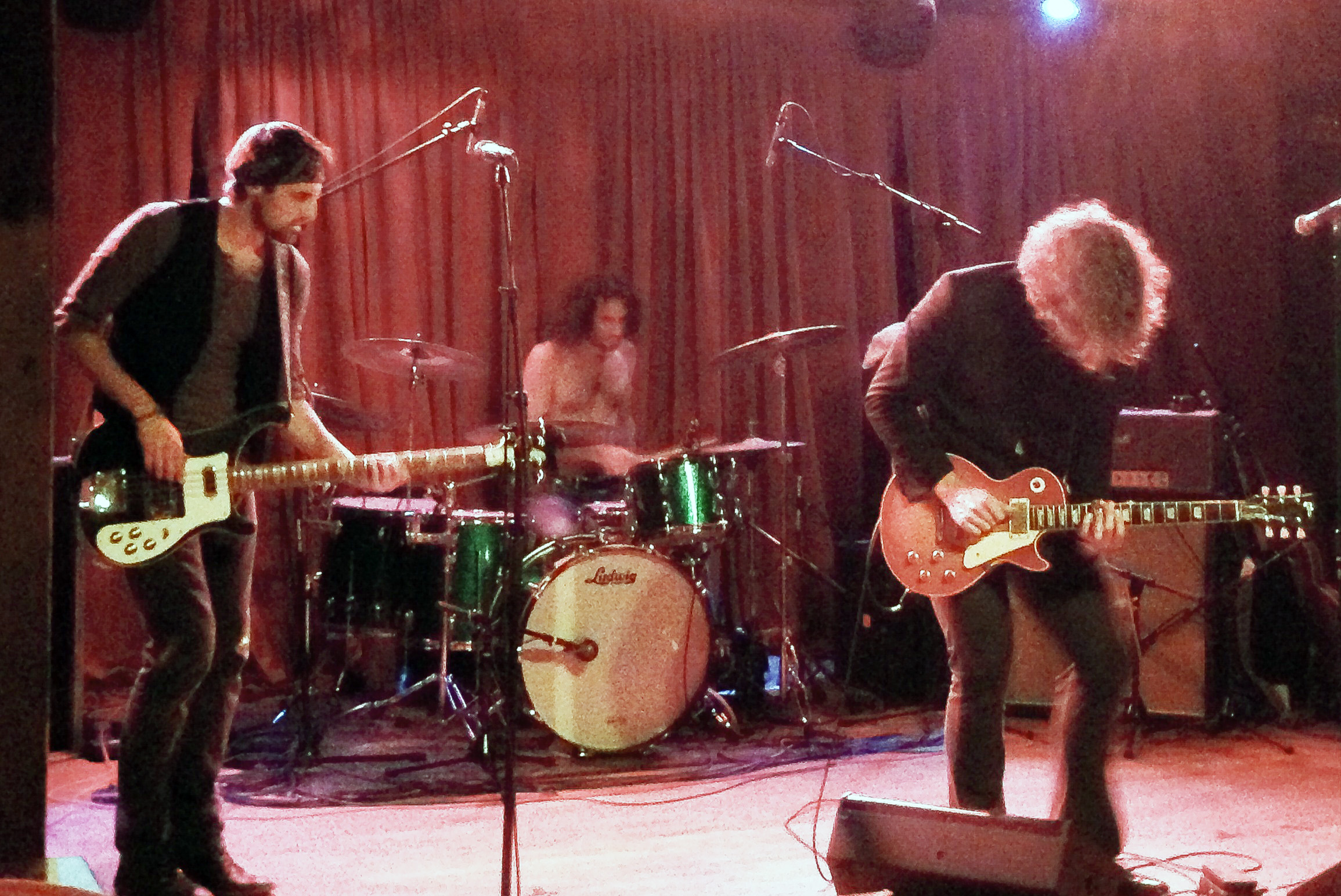
- Performing at the Mercy Lounge, Nashville TN (2014)

Background information
- Origin: Nashville, Tennessee, United States
- Genres: Psychedelic soul • Blues rock
- Years active: 2010–2017
- Labels: Mascot
- Past members: Frank Howard Swart; JD Simo; Adam Abrashoff; Elad Shapiro

SIMO was an American rock band which formed in Nashville, Tennessee, United States. The group was notable for having guitarist JD Simo, and is a psychedelic soul modern rock band that also incorporated extended improvisation into its live sets. They released one self-released album as well as a live EP and two studio albums for the Mascot Label Group.

== History ==
In December 2010, bassist Frank Howard Swart contacted guitarist Simo about setting up a jam session with drummer Adam Abrashoff, with whom he had played with extensively. After growing dissatisfied with session work and backing other groups, Simo agreed to the jam session. They played for three hours without stopping, after which the group decided to form a band.

After recording and releasing their first album in 2011, SIMO toured regionally around the south as well as frequent shows in Nashville. They also garnered some slots at music festivals including Mountain Jam, the Warren Haynes Christmas Jam, and Bonnaroo.

2015 brought the band its first tours out of the south. They opened shows for Gregg Allman and Deep Purple, and participating in Joe Bonamassa's inaugural cruise. Also Elad Shapiro joined in early 2015 solidifying the lineup. The group received standing ovations on the two occasions they played the Ryman Auditorium in Nashville opening for both Allman and Deep Purple respectively. As well as opening shows, JD also frequently became a guest on stage with Blackberry Smoke, Joe Bonamassa, Trigger Hippy, and Jack Pearson, a former member of The Allman Brothers Band. JD also participated in the 100th Birthday celebration for Les Paul in Paul's hometown of Waukesha in August.

On the success of their live show, growing fan base and a word of support from their friend Joe Bonamassa, the group ended up signing with Mascot Label Group in June 2015. They finished their second record entitled Let Love Show the Way at the Allman Brothers former residence in Macon, Georgia which was released January 29, 2016 on CD, vinyl, and digital download.

The album debuted at number 4 on the Billboard Blues chart in January 2016. The album garnered positive reviews and numerous national and international press coverage from music journals such as No Depression, Rolling Stone, Guitar Player, Relix, Guitar World and NPR. The band was featured on NPR's World Cafe which was broadcast nationally after the initial broadcast in late January on Philadelphia's WXPN. As a result, the band was featured at the annual Non Comm Festival the following June, which garnered positive reviews from their closing set for the convention. The band started its first full national tour in January 2016. Bringing them to over 37 states in just under 4 months, playing over 80 shows. However, in the middle of the tour, they returned a second time to Europe where JD sustained a dislocated knee the first night of the tour in Paris. The show was postponed but the tour resumed the following day with JD having to sit for the rest of the performances. JD finally healed by late May and was able to perform standing again. US touring resumed with opening dates for Blackberry Smoke as well as headline dates including the NYC sell out show at the Mercury Lounge.

The group returned to Europe yet again at the end of June to start their third European tour in Italy with two shows with Blackberry Smoke. Then their first festival headline slot at Puisto Blues Festival in Finland for over 6,000 fans. Festival slots at Cornbury Music Festival and Ramblin' Man Fair in the UK, Bospop in the Netherlands, The Guitarra Festival in France and Burg Herzberg Festival in Germany followed. More positive reviews and national press followed as a result of their performances at all these national festivals.

The group started another American tour in August, 2016, while starting work on the follow-up to "Let Love Show the Way". The wrapped up their last American tour of 2016 in mid October, closing out 128 domestic dates for the year. They embarked on their fourth tour of Europe, their first headlining, on October 28 with a taping of the German television show Rockpalast. They finished the tour with sell-out shows in London and Helsinki. At the London show they received the "Best Live Act of 2016" award from Bluebird Reviews Music Awards. At the close of 2016 they had performed 215 shows, in nine countries. Sessions for the follow-up album to "Let Love Show The Way" where due to start in January 2017 in Nashville. Interviews leading up to the break in December hinted at a more Pysch Soul approach, citing Alabama Shakes Sound and Color, Isaac Hayes Hot Buttered Soul and Funkadelic's Maggot Brain as group favorites at the time.

The group spent over four months total to make their sophomore album Rise and Shine. Taking a completely different approach than any of their previous work, they experimented and stretched to make a highly detailed loosely based concept piece. JD claimed that much of the lyrical content was autobiographical and was hard for him to listen to at times because of its revealing nature. The album was released on September 15, 2017.

At the beginning of 2018 JD did his first solo tour in support of Tommy Emmanuel. In the months following, JD continued to perform in a solo capacity with a revolving cast of friends rounding out the lineup. Only Adam Abrashoff remained as the drummer. In August JD announced that his first solo album would be released in early 2019.

== Members ==
=== Former members ===
- Frank Swart – bass, backing vocals (2010-2014)
- JD Simo – guitar, vocals (2010–2017)
- Adam Abrashoff – drums (2010–2017)
- Elad Shapiro – bass, backing vocals (2015–2017)

== Discography ==
- SIMO (2011)
- Shake It/Aoh (Single, 2011)
- Love Vol. 1 (2015) (four song EP recorded live at Mercy Lounge, Nashville). Titles: 1 "Rather Die in Vain" 2 "What´s On Your Mind" 3 "Off at 11" 4 "Shake It"
- Let Love Show The Way (2016)
- Rise & Shine (2017)
