= Love, Save the Empty =

Studio album by Erin McCarley
- Released: December 30, 2008
- Studios: Little Big Sound and Big Studios (Nashville, Tennessee); The Galt Line (Hollywood, California)
- Genres: Pop rock, alternative rock, acoustic rock
- Length: 45:38
- Label: Universal Republic
- Producer: Jamie Kenney

Erin McCarley chronology
Love, Save the Empty (2008)	My Stadium Electric (2012)

Singles from Love, Save the Empty
- 1. "Pony (It's OK)" Released: February 2, 2008; 2. "Love, Save the Empty" Released: June 8, 2008; 3. "Pitter-Pat" Released: November 17, 2008

Professional ratings
Review scores
Source	Rating
AllMusic	3/5 stars
American Songwriter	3.5/5 stars
Artistdirect	3.5/5 stars
Hartford Courant	(Positive)
New York Times	(Positive)
Scripps Howard News Service	4/5 stars
Times Herald-Record	B
Ultimate Guitar	(8.3/10)

Love, Save the Empty is the 2008 debut album by American pop rock singer Erin McCarley. It was released digitally through Universal Republic Records on iTunes on December 30, 2008. The hard copy was released on January 6, 2009. Jamie Kenney, McCarley's musical partner, produced the album and also arranged, played, and co-wrote most of the songs.

McCarley toured throughout January to promote her release. Love, Save the Empty peaked at No. 5 on iTunes "Top Albums" chart on January 2, 2009, resulting in a No. 86 debut on the Billboard 200 in the issue dated January 17, 2009. The following week, the album rose ten spots to a new peak of 76.

In addition, all three of her singles released from the album charted. The song "Love, Save the Empty" is the song featured mostly in He's Just Not That Into You and is the only track featured in the film with has a music video. Both "Love, Save the Empty" and "Pitter-Pat" were featured on the fifth season of Grey's Anatomy. "Love, Save the Empty" was included in the first season of the CW's show Privileged. "Pony (It's OK)" and "Pitter-Pat" were featured in One Tree Hill.

Both "Pony (It's OK)" and "Pitter-Pat" have been on the Triple A (Adult Album Alternative) chart, and "Love, Save the Empty" made the Hot Adult Top 40 (or Hot AC) chart as well as VH1's Top 20 Video Countdown, where it peaked at No. 17.

== Track listing ==
All tracks are written by Erin McCarley and Jamie Kenney except where noted.

Love, Save the Empty track listing
No.	Title	Writer(s)	Length
1.	"Pony (It's OK)"		3:26
2.	"Blue Suitcase"		3:28
3.	"Sticky-Sweet"		3:27
4.	"Lovesick Mistake"		4:15
5.	"Love, Save the Empty"		3:16
6.	"It's Not That Easy"	McCarley; Kenney; David Rolfe	4:22
7.	"Hello/Goodbye"	McCarley	3:58
8.	"Pitter-Pat"		4:19
9.	"SleepWalking"	McCarley; Kenney; Wayne Rodrigues	3:32
10.	"Bobble Head"	McCarley; Kenney; Greg Laswell; Shaun Shankel	3:22
11.	"Gotta Figure This Out"	McCarley	4:48
12.	"Pony (It's OK)" (acoustic bonus track)		3:25
Total length:			45:38

== Personnel ==
- Erin McCarley – vocals, backing vocals (2–10), acoustic guitar (3, 8)
- Jamie Kenney – keyboards, programming, all brass and string orchestration, backing vocals (1–3, 6, 8–11), glockenspiel (1, 4), finger snaps (1), acoustic guitar (7)
- Chris Graffagnio – guitars
- Paul Moak – guitars (1, 9)
- Brandon Waters – guitars (1–6, 10, 11)
- Mike Payne – guitars (5, 7)
- Tony Lucido – bass, Moog bass (7)
- Jeremy Lutito – drums
- Max Abrams – brass (3)
- Roy Agee – brass (3)
- Steve Patrick – brass (3)
- Claire Indie – cello (4, 8, 9), additional cello (5), strings (11)
- David Angell – strings (4, 5)
- Monisa Angell – strings (4, 5)
- John Catchings – strings (4, 5)
- David Davidson – strings (4, 5)

=== Production ===
- Nate Albert – A&R
- Tom Mackay – A&R
- Jamie Kenney – producer, arrangements, recording (1–10)
- Tim Craven – recording (1, 9)
- Steve Lotz – recording (2–8, 10)
- Billy Whittington – string recording (4, 5)
- Craig Alvin – mixing, additional engineer (3), recording (11)
- Geoff Piller – mix assistant, additional engineer (3)
- Eric Robertson – additional engineer (11)
- George Marino – mastering at Sterling Sound (New York, NY)
- Gillian Russell – A&R administration
- Dave Huyoung – production coordinator
- Jeri Heiden – art direction, design
- Amy Martin – design
- Reid Rolls – booklet front and back cover photography
- Kurt Iswarienko – inlay card photography
- Justin Eshak – management
- Michael McDonald – management
