= Joe Robinson (musician) =

Australian musical artist

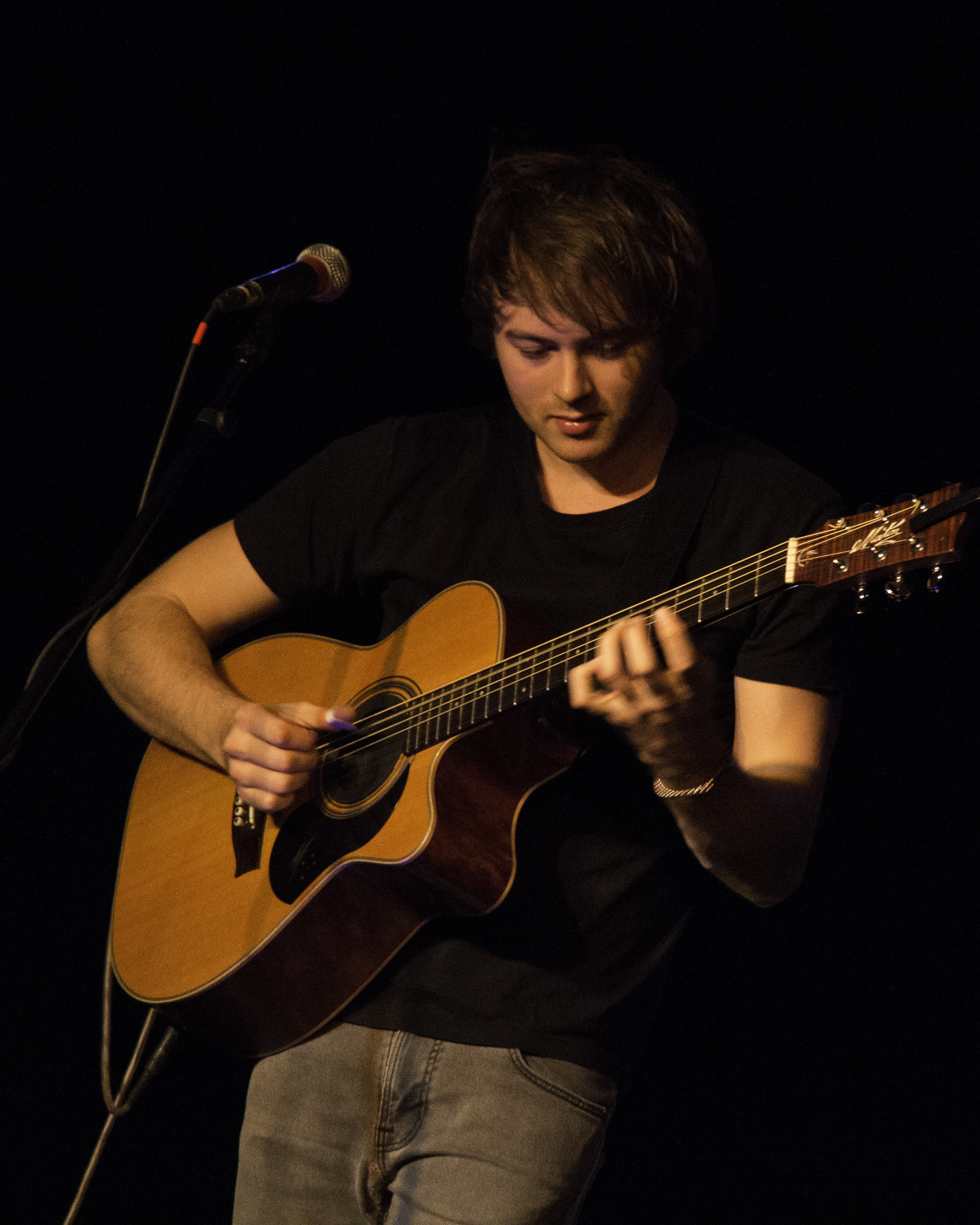

Background information
- Also known as: "Smokin' Joe"
- Born: Joseph Robert Robinson; 25 May 1991 (age 35); Temagog, New South Wales, Australia
- Genres: Rock; blues; jazz; jazz fusion; folk; fingerstyle guitar; experimental
- Occupations: Musician; songwriter; composer; guitar teacher; producer
- Instruments: Guitar; vocals
- Years active: 2000–present
- Labels: Joe's Garage, MGM Distribution/Australia, ABC Music, P-Vine, The Riff Ranch
- Website: www.joerobinson.com

Joseph Robert Robinson (born 25 May 1991) is an Australian guitar player and vocalist. A largely self-taught musician from Temagog, New South Wales, he is best known for his virtuoso guitar abilities and for winning the 2008 season of Australia's Got Talent.

== Early life ==
Robinson was born in Temagog, a rural locality near Kempsey, New South Wales. He started playing piano at the age of 6, only because he was told his fingers were too small to play the guitar. Aged 10, he quit piano and began to play the guitar. He outgrew his guitar teacher in less than 12 months, and started to teach himself from the internet.

== Career ==
When he was 11 years old, Joe Robinson began touring with different Australian artists, including Tommy Emmanuel, who became his mentor.

When Robinson was 13, he won the Australian National Songwriting Competition.

In 2006, Robinson recorded his debut album, titled Birdseed, produced by Parris Macleod at Cloud Studios in Wyong, New South Wales.

At the age of 17, Robinson won the Australia's Got Talent grand finale on 1 July 2008, performing a fingerstyle cover of "Classical Gas."

In August 2008, Joe travelled to Nashville, Tennessee, and recorded his second album "Time Jumpin" with producer Frank Rogers. "Time Jumpin'" was released in 2009.

On 19 July 2009, Robinson was awarded the 2009 Senior Grand Champion Performer of the World at the World Championships of Performing Arts in Los Angeles and also won the instrumental category among seniors in the same competition, as well as the male instrumental categories Contemporary, Jazz, Open and Original Works in the class of 16 to 24-year-old contestants.

In September 2009, he formed the Joe Robinson Electric Project with Sam Marks on drums and Chris Haigh on bass, embarking on an Australian national tour. Joe was the opening act for Australian music icon John Farnham in a series of six consecutive shows at the Burswood Theatre in Perth in October 2009 as part of Farnham's comeback tour.

After moving to Nashville, Tennessee at the age of 18 he was invited to perform at the prestigious Bonnaroo Music Festival in June 2010.

Robinson was named "Best New Talent" in Guitar Player magazine 2010 Reader's Poll. Lenny Breau and Tommy Emmanuel have inspired him to develop his own harmonic technique.

In September 2010, he performed at Live on the Green in Nashville, Tennessee, alongside "The Wailers." Then in November, Robinson began "The Houdini tour" in Europe, traveling through Germany, Czech Republic, Croatia, Slovakia, Austria, Hungary, Serbia and Italy. From the beginning, Robinson's concept of this tour was to "escape the expectations" of him as a performer. He added vocal selections and brought along two musicians from the United States, bassist Bernard Harris and drummer Marcus Hill. After the month-long acclaimed European performances, Robinson continued on to Japan for a stint of highly anticipated solo appearances in Tokyo and Osaka through mid-December. His first time in Japan proved to be widely lauded and well received for the 19-year-old musician. From those shows he landed a recording contract with P-Vine Records. Returning to his Australian homeland for the holidays, Robinson resumed his tour on 5 January in Eumundi and ended it on 29 January in Melbourne.

He spent much of 2011 in the studio recording his third album featuring vocal bass material and a rhythm section Keith Carlock and Michael Rhodes bass. The first single, "Out Alive," was released in Australia on 2 December 2011 with the full CD Let Me Introduce You released through Australian label ABC on 20 January 2012. Robinson toured Australia to promote the release, including a five performances at the Woodford Folk Festival in late December 2011.

In 2012, Robinson released the "Toe Jam" EP on which he wrote, produced and played most of the instruments. Upon completion of the EP, Joe and his two musicians, Sam Marks (drums) and Marcelo Bakos (bass guitar) toured the US, headlining shows in New York, Chicago, DC, and Boston. While in Boston, Joe gave a seminar at the prestigious Berklee College of Music.

He returned to Australia in late 2012 for a series of headline dates and festivals, which included the Festival of the Sun in Port Maquarie, NSW. Robinson released his new EP through the independent distributor MGM to coincide with the tour.

Robinson spent the majority of 2013 touring North America. Headlining clubs all over the North East, as well as stints in Texas and the West Coast. After a short headlining run in China and Japan, he spent most of the summer playing festivals, including Canada's Ottawa Bluesfest (alongside The Black Keys and Dixie Chicks), Nashville's Live on the Green with Robert Randolph and Fender's celebration event leading up to the Eric Clapton Crossroads Guitar Festival at Madison Square Garden.

In 2014, he released the "Gemini Vol. 1" EP. Although a strong vocal performance carries the EP, it is his driving guitar - a mix of blues, rock, jazz, and R&B all his own - that ties it to his previous releases. Robinson played almost every instrument on the self-produced EP, lending a level of intimacy to the album.

Following up "Gemini Vol. 2" was released 31 October 2015. Joe Robinson played all the instruments, produced and mixed the 4 song EP.

Touring extensively with his solo show in 2016, Robinson also collaborated with 'Guitar Army', a trio of triple threat guitar players, writers and singers; Robinson, Robben Ford and Lee Roy Parnell.

In 2019, Robinson performed at Eric Clapton's Crossroads guitar festival in Dallas, and also toured Europe and China. He released his 12-week online guitar course, featuring guest mentors, Robben Ford, Steve Vai, Tommy Emmanuel, Eric Johnson, Keb' Mo', John Jorgenson, Rodney Crowell, Fred Gretsch, Rory Hoffman, Brent Maher, Gary Nicholson, Joe Glaser, Don Peake, Andy Allen, Ray Kennedy, Daniel Levitin, and more.

In 2020, Maton guitars announced the JR Signature guitar, available worldwide. Built to his own specifications, the guitar features an ultra playable neck, stainless steel frets, and Tasmanian Myrtle back and sides.

During the COVID-19 pandemic, Robinson began a livestream series titled Live From Home, which consistently ranked in Pollstar’s top 100 livestream charts. He also performed a handful of shows as lead guitarists in Americana Icon, Emmylou Harris' "Red Dirt Boys". He also released his Borders album, which was written about not being able to visit his fiancée during the pandemic due to Canadian and U.S. border closures.

In 2021, Robinson released his Christmas au Chalet album, which was recorded in a remote, solar powered chalet in Quebec, Canada. The New York Times selected the album as one of “13 New Christmas Albums That Revisit (And Redefine!) Holiday Classics”. He also was an instructor at rock guitar legend Steve Vai’s ‘Vai Academy 6.0’ in Las Vegas, Nevada.

After creating some of the most popular guitar courses for TrueFire and Udemy, Robinson launched his own online guitar teaching academy, ‘Invisible Technique’.

Robinson released his seventh studio album, The Prize, in 2022, produced by 7-time Grammy winner Brent Maher, and featuring legendary session musicians Nir Z, Glenn Worf, Tim Lauer, and Wendy Moten. Acoustic Guitar magazine describes his playing as "a laid-back, smooth soulfulness that's jazzy without being cerebral, played with an effortlessness that makes all this incredible technique look easy".

Robinson and his wife, illustrator Genevieve Viel-Taschereau moved to rural Montana, United States, where their son was born in 2023. Robinson built a recording studio on their property called ‘The Riff Ranch’.

== Discography ==
=== Studio albums ===
Release date	Title	Recording date	Label	Formats
2007	Birdseed	2007	Sunball Records	CD
2009	Time Jumpin	2008	Joe's Garage	CD
2012	Let Me Introduce You	2011	Joe's Garage	CD
2019	Undertones	2019	Joe's Garage	CD, Vinyl, DD
2020	Borders	2020	Joe's Garage	CD, Vinyl, DD
2021	Christmas au chalet	2020	Joe's Garage	CD, Vinyl, DD
2022	The Prize	2022	Joe's Garage	CD, Vinyl, DD

=== Singles and EPs ===
Release date	Title	Recording date	Label	Formats
2012	Toe Jam	2012	Joe's Garage	CD
2014	Gemini Vol. 1	2014	Joe's Garage	CD
2015	Gemini Vol. 2	2015	Joe's Garage	CD
2019	Reputation	2019	Joe's Garage	DD
2019	(Do You Want It) To Be Me	2019	Joe's Garage	DD

=== Appearances ===
Release date	Title	Song titles	Recording date	Label	Formats
2010	Lee Ritenour's 6 String Theory	Daddy Longlicks	2010	Concord	CD, DVD-A

=== Compilations ===
Release date	Title	Song titles	Recording date	Label	Formats
2009	While My Guitar Gently Weeps Vol.2	It's Not Easy	2009	Universal Music	2xCD, Comp
2010	Byron Bay Bluesfest 2010	Strutting It	2009	Universal	2xCD, Comp
2013	Le Grand Bleu Taormina	Adelaide, Skyline, Keep It Together	2011	Double Standard Clothing	CD, Comp + DVDr, Single
2011	Best Of Blues & Roots 2011	Strutting It	2009	Universal, ABC Music	2xCD, Comp

=== Credits ===
Release date	Performer	Title	Recording date	Label	Formats
2014	Russell Morris	Dexter's Big Tin Can	2014	Fanfare Records	CD, LP
2018	Rodney Crowell	Acoustic Classics	2018	RC1 Records	CD
2018	Dami Im	I Hear A Song	2018	Sony Music	CD

== See also ==
- Kempsey, New South Wales
- St Paul's College, Kempsey
- Australia's Got Talent
- Chet Atkins
- Jerry Reed
- Tommy Emmanuel

Preceded by Bonnie Anderson	Winner of Australia's Got Talent; 2008	Succeeded by Mark Vincent
