= WRLT =

Coordinates: 36.035°N 86.848°W

- Franklin, Tennessee; United States
- Broadcast area: Nashville, Tennessee
- Frequency: 100.1 MHz
- Branding: Lightning 100

Programming
- Format: Adult album alternative

Ownership
- Owner: Tuned-in Broadcasting, Inc (Sale pending to Sevens Network.)

History
- First air date: December 1986; 39 years ago
- Former call signs: WIZO-FM (1979-1987); WWRB (1987-1988); WWRB-FM (1988)
- Call sign meaning: Lite 100 (Previous Format)

Technical information
- Licensing authority: FCC
- Facility ID: 24427
- Class: A
- ERP: 200 watts
- HAAT: 360 meters (1,180 ft)

Links
- Public license information: Public file; LMS
- Webcast: Listen Live
- Website: lightning100.com

WRLT (branded "Lightning 100") is an adult album alternative-formatted FM radio station in the Nashville, Tennessee market and located at 100.1 MHz. The station is licensed to Franklin, Tennessee, some 20 miles south of Nashville. The station is owned by Tuned-in Broadcasting.

Previously failing in modern country and rock formats, the current format was adopted in the mid-1980s under the leadership of Ned Horton. Since then, the format has been "tweaked" on numerous occasions.

WRLT's playlist is an eclectic mix of artists, up-and-coming singer/songwriters, and other current music. Artists as varied as My Morning Jacket, Led Zeppelin, Beck and Brett Dennen can be heard on the station. Lightning 100 was the first station in the Music City to play artists such as Jason Mraz, John Mayer, Sheryl Crow and Dave Matthews Band. The station, highly unusual for contemporary-era commercial stations in the U.S., has demonstrated a considerable dedication to live programming.

Programming highlights include the "Lightning Request" lunch hour, the615 each Monday evening (featuring unsigned bands that call Nashville home), the Indie Underground Hour on Thursday nights, and Lightning 100 Unplugged on Sunday mornings.

In 2006, WRLT launched the syndicated talk radio show Music Business Radio, hosted by music marketing expert, consultant, and author David Hooper, and features interviews with various industry professionals giving the listener their insight and expertise into the recording business, particularly Nashville's segment of it.

WRLT is also home to community outreach and special events through Team Lightning (rebranded from Team Green Adventures in late 2017), an outdoor adventure group with a mission to increase awareness about the environment, health, and community through adventure, and Live on the Green, a free music festival on the plaza at the Metro Nashville Courthouse during September, highlighting local artists and businesses.

On November 10, 2026, Tuned In Broadcasting announced its intent to sell Lightning 100 to the Sevens Network, owned by country singer Garth Brooks. The station will flip to a full service country music format upon closing, while the Lightning programming will move to Cromwell Radio's W292ED and an HD subchannel of WPRT-FM.

== Full-time DJs ==
- Jayson Chalfant (6 a.m.-10 a.m.)
- Melissa Summitt (6 a.m.-10 a.m.)
- Stephanie Lesher (10 a.m.-12.p.m Weekdays; 6 a.m.-12 p.m. Saturday; 2 p.m.-7 p.m.)
- Dan Buckley (12 p.m.–3 p.m.)
- Lightning Casey (3 p.m.- 7 p.m.)

== Other DJs ==
- Keith Coes
- David Hooper (Music Business Radio)
