= Bailen (band) =

American band

BAILEN
- Origin: New York City, United States
- Genre: Alternative
- Instruments: Vocals, bass guitar, synthesizer, guitar
- Labels: Formerly Fantasy Records, now independent
- Members: Daniel Bailen, David Bailen, Julia Bailen
- Website: bailentheband.com

BAILEN is an American alternative music group based in New York City. The band consists of fraternal twins Daniel Bailen (vocals/bass/synth/guitar) and David Bailen (vocals/drums), as well as younger sister Julia Bailen (vocals/guitar). The band performed a Paste Session on February 5, 2019 and had their single "I Was Wrong" featured as Song of the Day by The Current on March 14, 2019. Their single "I Was Wrong" was featured by NPR World Cafe in "Heavy Rotation: 10 Songs They Can't Stop Listening To" on March 30, 2019. The band was featured in Billboard just a few weeks later on April 18, 2019.

The band's Fantasy Records debut album, Thrilled To Be Here, produced by GRAMMY-Award winner John Congleton (St. Vincent, The War on Drugs), was released on April 26, 2019. On January 25, 2019, the band released "I Was Wrong", the first song off "Thrilled To Be Here."

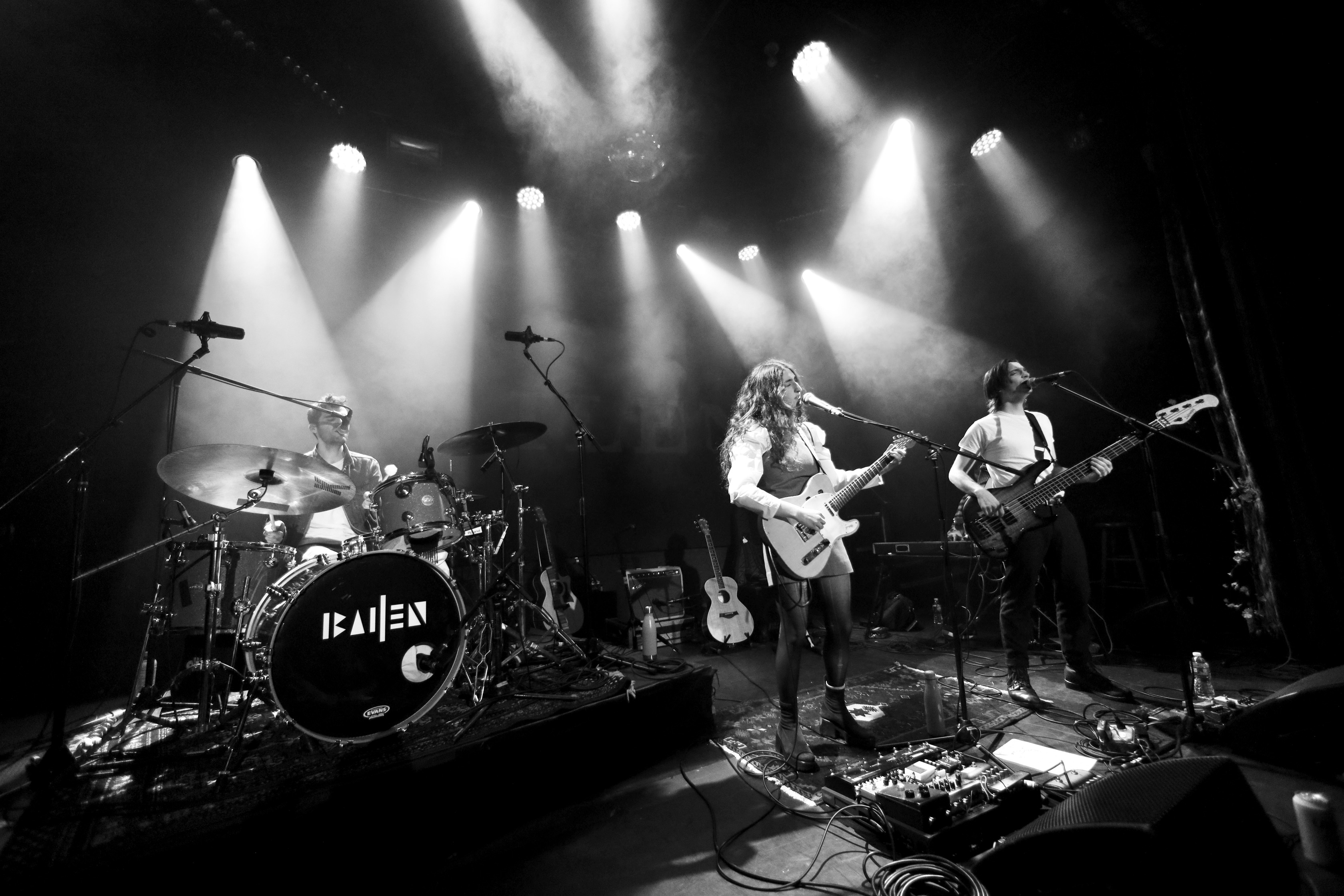
Bailen performing at the Bowery Ballroom, 2019

On August 7, 2019, BAILEN performed their song "Something Tells Me" on TODAY.

Moving into 2020, the band's song "Your Love Is All I Know" was featured on XPN’s Top 100 Songs of 2019 list.

On February 14, 2023, BAILEN announced their next studio album release on Fantasy Records, Tired Hearts, accompanied by the first single released from the album, "Call It Like It Is." Available May 5, 2023, the album was produced by Brad Cook and BAILEN, and mixed by Lars Stalfors.

BAILEN released their first post-Fantasy Records single "SWIM!!!", along with a music video, on June 24, 2026. Their third album, also titled SWIM!!!, was released September 25, 2026.
