= J. D. Simo =

American singer-songwriter

JD Simo
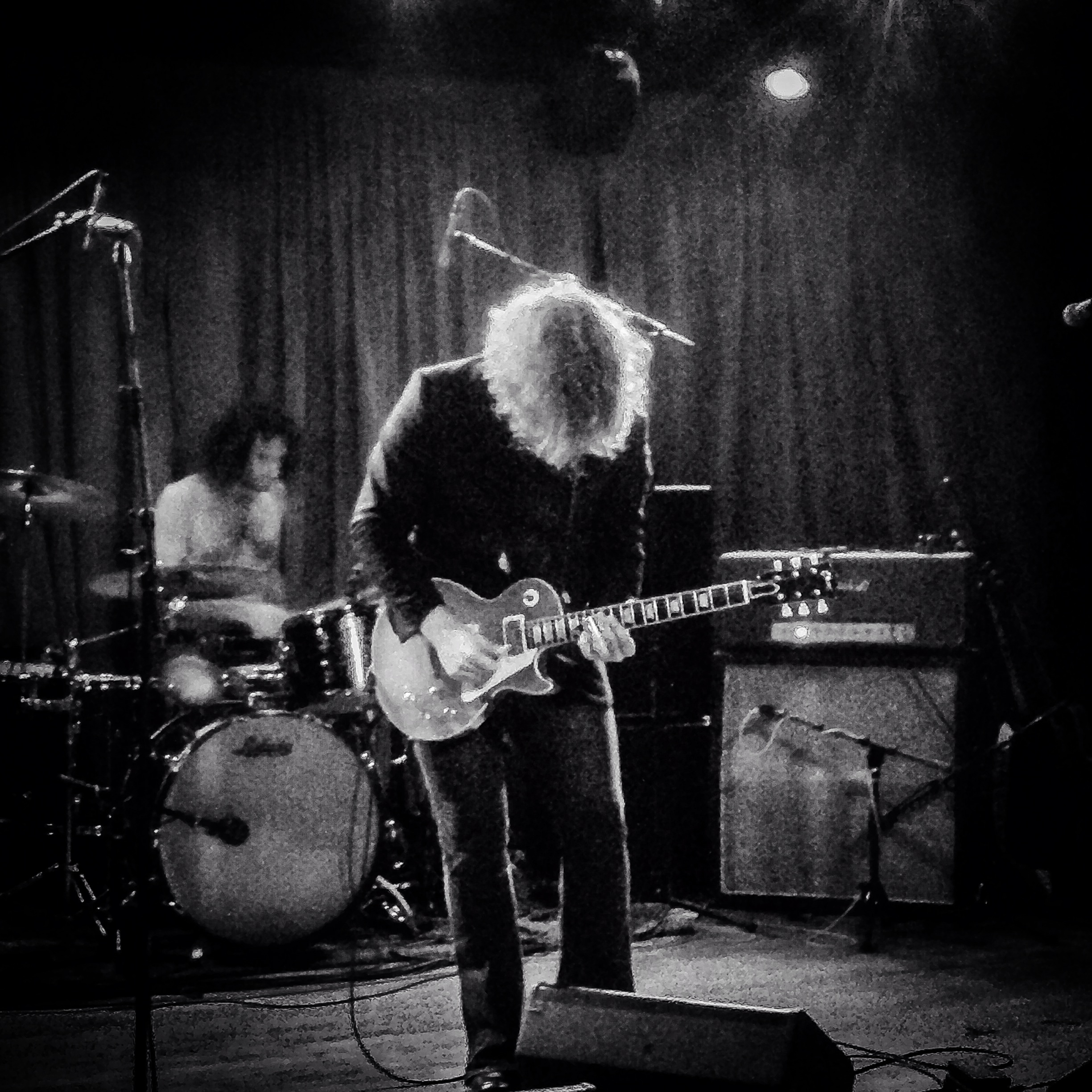
- JD Simo performing with SIMO in 2014

Background information
- Born: Chicago, Illinois, United States
- Occupations: Musician, singer, songwriter, producer
- Instruments: Vocals, guitar, keyboards
- Years active: 2000–present
- Labels: Mascot Label Group; Crowesfeet Music Group
- Website: simo.fm

JD Simo is an American guitarist, singer-songwriter and producer.

== Biography ==
Simo was born in Chicago in 1985.

As a session guitarist, Simo has worked with Jack White (Beyoncé Lemonade sessions), Dolly Parton, Phil Lesh, James McCartney, Tommy Emmanuel, David Kahne, Cowboy Jack Clement, Dave Cobb, Paul Worley, George Porter, Anson Funderburgh, Peter Collins, Joe Bonamassa, Chris Isaak, Stevie Nicks, Kid Rock, Kirk Fletcher, Duane Betts, War and Treaty, Cody Johnson and Jay Buchanan among many others.

Baz Luhrmann used him on the soundtrack and score of the Elvis biopic as well as the live documentary EPIC. For the Bruce Springsteen biopic “Deliver Me From Nowhere”, Simo played on the soundtrack as well as parts of the score and all of the on screen music portions. He also served as the on set music script supervisor and guitar coach to Jeremy Allen White.

He is a former member of the Don Kelley Band (2007–2012), a historic house band at Robert's Western World in Nashville, Tennessee; other alumni include Brent Mason, Troy Lancaster, Redd Volkaert, Johnny Hiland, Guthrie Trapp, Kenny Vaughan, Daniel Donato, Luke McQuery and bassist Dave Roe (Johnny Cash, Dwight Yoakam, John Mellencamp, John Prine), who recommended Simo for the guitar slot.

He was a member of the psychedelic rock band SIMO from 2012-2018. He has released four solo albums to date.

Announced in 2024, Simo joined a new band with Luther Dickinson and Adam Abrashoff. An album titled Do The Rump was released in fall 2024.

He resides in Nashville with his wife and daughter.

== Discography ==
- Off at 11 (2019)
- JD Simo (2020)
- Mind Control (2021)
- Songs from the House of Grease (2023)
- & Luther Dickinson - Do The Rump (2024)

with SIMO:

- SIMO (2011) (album)
- Let Love Show The Way (2016) (album)
- Rise & Shine (2017)
