= Kesang Marstrand =

American folk singer, songwriter and guitarist (born 1981)

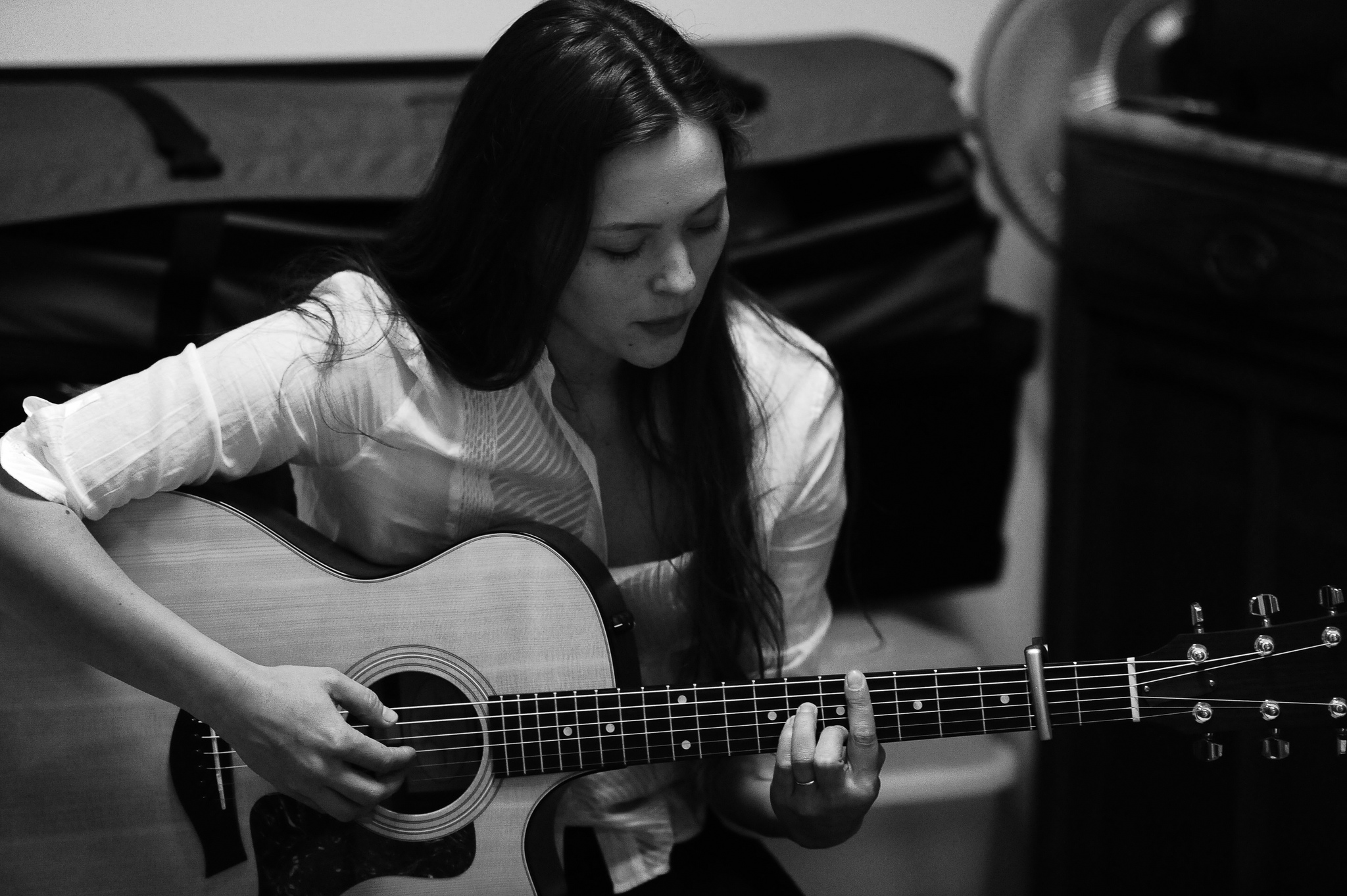

Background information
- Born: October 31, 1981 (age 44); Woodstock, New York, U.S.
- Genres: Folk
- Occupations: Singer-songwriter, producer, musician
- Instruments: Guitar, vocals
- Years active: 2008–present
- Website: kesangmarstrand.com

Kesang Marstrand (born October 31, 1981) is an American folk singer, songwriter, and guitarist. She is best known for the single "Tibet Will Be Free" that she wrote after March 2008 unrest in Tibet, in support of the non-violent resistance of the Tibetan people, and for her debut album, Bodega Rose, which was released November 21, 2008.

== Early life ==
Born in Woodstock, New York, to a Danish mother and Tibetan father. She grew up in Colorado and she later moved to New York City . Her interest in music began at an early age, as she discovered her passion for music via a piano in the common room of a schoolhouse in Colorado. Marstrand started to study and practice meditation when she was 16, and had the opportunity to spend time at Bokar Monastery in India, as well as the chance to visit Bodhgaya and Dharamshala.

== Career ==
Kesang Marstrand has been writing and performing for the past decade. In November 2008, she released her debut album, Bodega Rose, a contemplative, acoustic work that includes accompaniment by renowned musician and composer, Karl Berger. The album, in addition to eleven original tracks, also includes a cover song, a sparse, down-tempo version of Paul McCartney and Michael Jackson's collaboration, "Say Say Say".

In August 2009, Kesang Marstrand released her second Album, Hello Night, an album of lullabies mostly appropriate for children aged between 0 and 4.

Kesang Marstrand moved to Tunis, Tunisia from 2010 to 2013, where she was active on cultural scene. During the heights of 2011 Tunisian Revolution which toppled the president Zine el-Abidine Ben Ali, she had released her slow interpretation of the national anthem of Tunisia – Humat al-Hima with positive response.

Her third album, Our Myth, was released on May 15, 2011.

Marstrand produced her newest album For My Love entirely at home in New York City. The result is ten songs that mark her debut as a producer, already have been called "an unusually gifted singer and composer," according to Michael Erlewine, founder of AllMusic. In support of the album, Marstrand performed on SiriusXM's Coffee House Live, with her performance airing on June 23, 2016.

In 2016, Marstrand supplied vocals for electronic act Tiger Mountain's single, My Heart Is A War.

== Albums ==
Release	Album	Cover
November 2008	Bodega Rose	
August 2009	Hello Night	
May 2011	Our Myth	
June 2014	Karmapa Khyenno	The CD cover is an exclusive artistic production of the 17th Gyalwang Karmapa Ogyen Trinley Dorje leader of the Karma Kagyu.
December 2015	For My Love	For My Love
