= Humming House =

American folk band

- Origin: Nashville, Tennessee
- Genres: Folk, americana, folk rock
- Years active: 2011–2017
- Labels: Soundly Music, Sony Red, Humble Mouse
- Members: Justin Wade Tam; Bobby Chase; Joshua Wolak; Benjamin Jones
- Website: www.humminghouse.com

Humming House was an American folk band from Nashville, Tennessee.

== Career ==
Humming House began in 2011. The group released their first full-length album the following year. In 2014, Humming House released a live album titled Humming House Party!. In 2015, Humming House released their second full-length album titled Revelries. In 2017, Humming House released their third full-length album titled Companion.

== Band members ==
- Justin Wade Tam
- Bobby Chase
- Joshua Wolak
- Benjamin Jones

== Discography ==
Studio albums

- Humming House (2012, Humble Mouse)
- Revelries (2015, Humble Mouse)
- Companion (2017, Soundly Music, Sony Red)

Live albums

- Humming House Party! (2014, Humble Mouse)
