= The Weeks =

Blues/Rock band from Mississippi, transplanted to Nashville, TN

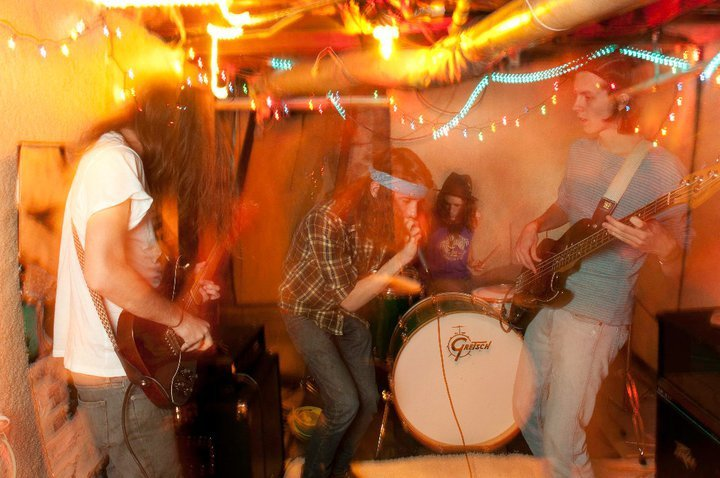

Background information
- Origin: Florence, Mississippi, United States
- Genres: Southern rock, alternative rock
- Years active: 2006–present
- Labels: Esperanza Plantation; Dine Alone Records (Canada); Serpents and Snakes Records; Crooked Letter Records
- Members: Cyle Barnes; Samuel Williams; Cain Barnes; Damien Bone
- Website: http://theweeksmusic.com/

The Weeks are an American rock band originating from Florence, Mississippi, United States.

The band was formed by Cain Barnes, Chaz Lindsay, Cyle Barnes, Damien Bone and Samuel Williams in March 2006 when they were between 14 and 16 years old. The band signed to the Esperanza Plantation label, with the debut album, Comeback Cadillac, released in July 2008. The album blended southern rock and alternative, and featured a duet with labelmate Allie Peden on "Sailor Song". Their debut EP, Rumspringa, followed in 2009.

After some lineup changes that left them with a four-piece of the Barnes twins, Bone and Williams, the band relocated to Nashville, Tennessee. In March 2011, they returned to Water Valley, Mississippi, to work with Winn McElroy at his Black Wings Studio on the eight songs that encompass a 12" EP entitled, "Gutter Gaunt Gangster", out October 11, 2011, on Esperanza Plantation. They spent the next six months touring with Junior Astronomers, Local H, North Mississippi All-Stars, Sol Cat, and The Meat Puppets. After signing with Kings of Leon's new record label Serpents and Snakes, they re-released Gutter Gaunt Gangster September 25, 2012. Their second full-length, Dear Bo Jackson, was released in the spring of 2013. This was followed by the release of Easy in 2017, and, most recently, Two Moons in the summer of 2019.

== Discography ==
=== Studio albums ===
- Dog Days (2006), Olympic Records (Out of print)
- Comeback Cadillac (2008), Esperanza Plantation
- Gutter Gaunt Gangster (2012), Serpents & Snakes Records
- Dear Bo Jackson (2013), Serpents & Snakes Records
- Easy (2017), Lightning Rod
- Two Moons (2019), Crooked Letter Records
- Twisted Rivers (2020), Crooked Letter Records

=== Extended plays ===
- Rumspringa EP (2009), Esperanza Plantation
- Buttons EP (2014), Serpents & Snakes Records

== Members ==
Current

- Cyle Barnes - Lead Vocals
- Samuel Williams - Guitar, Vocals
- Cain Barnes - Drums
- Damien Bone - Bass

Former

- Chaz Lindsay - Rhythm Guitar (2006–2009)
- Alex Collier - Piano, Organ, Vocals (2011-2015)
