= The Delta Saints =

American rock band

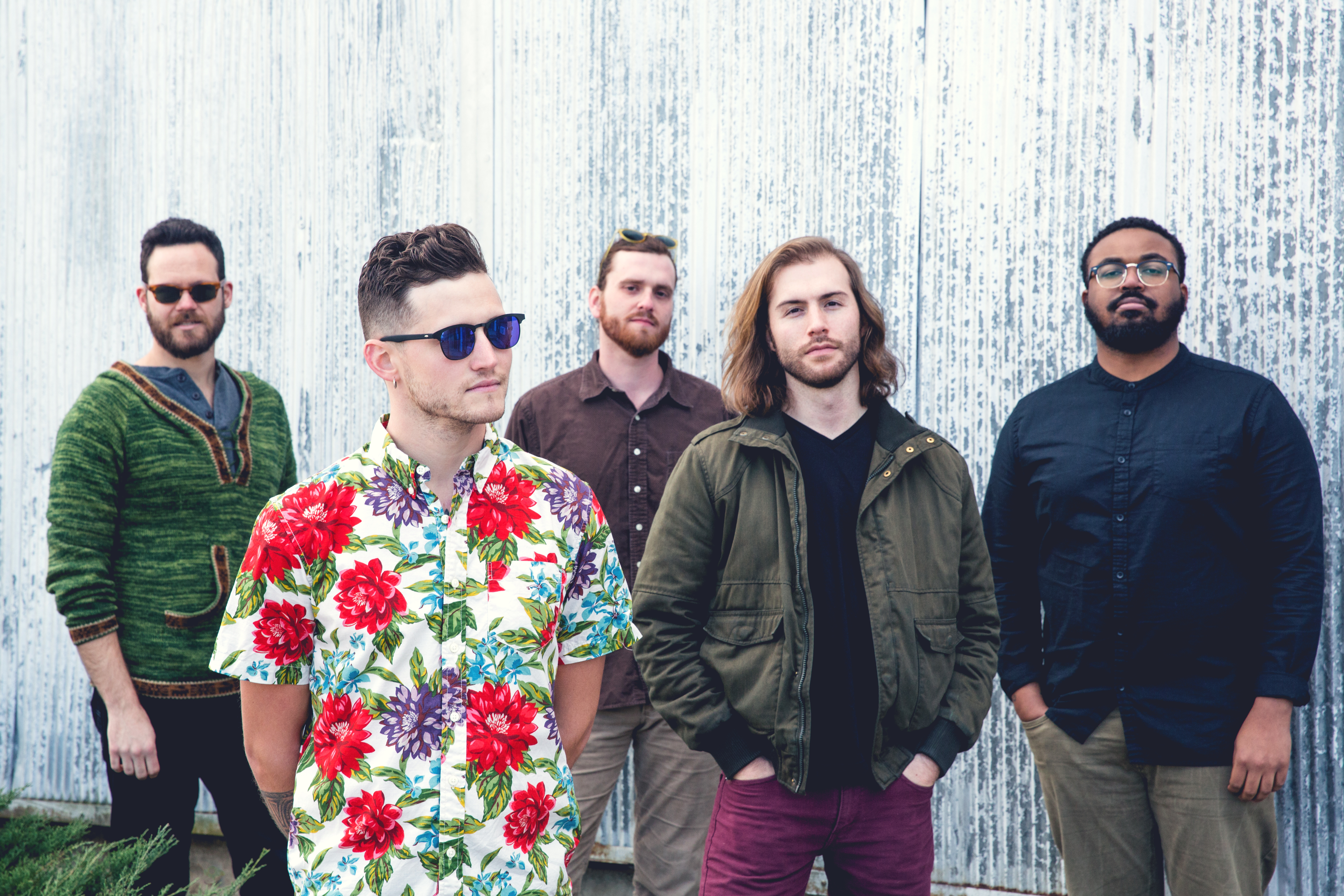
- Band in 2017

Background information
- Origin: Nashville
- Genre: Rock
- Years active: 2007–2018
- Members: Ben Ringel – Vocals, guitar; Nate Kremer – Keyboards, guitar; Dylan Fitch – Guitar; David Supica – Bass; Vincent Williams – Percussion
- Past members: Greg Hommert – Harmonica; Stephen Hanner – Harmonica; Ben Azzi – Percussion; Matt Bray – Guitar; John Shaw – Guitar
- Website: www.thedeltasaints.com

The Delta Saints was an American rock band from Nashville, Tennessee. The band consisted of Ben Ringel (vocals and guitar), Dylan Fitch (guitar), David Supica (bass), Vincent Williams (percussion), and Nate Kremer (keyboards).

== History ==
The band was formed in 2007 after Ben Ringel and David Supica met at Belmont University and began creating music together.

The band independently produced their first work, the EPs Pray On (in 2009) and A Bird Called Angola (in 2010).

Despite their increased success, the band decided to go on a little hiatus to pursue “other muses” that they’ve been wanting to chase, and other life stuff outside of music, like having kids and enjoying their marriages. Musically, Ringel hopes to work on more indie rock projects. Their drummer is working on producing a project with electronic/hip hop-type music.

=== European tour ===
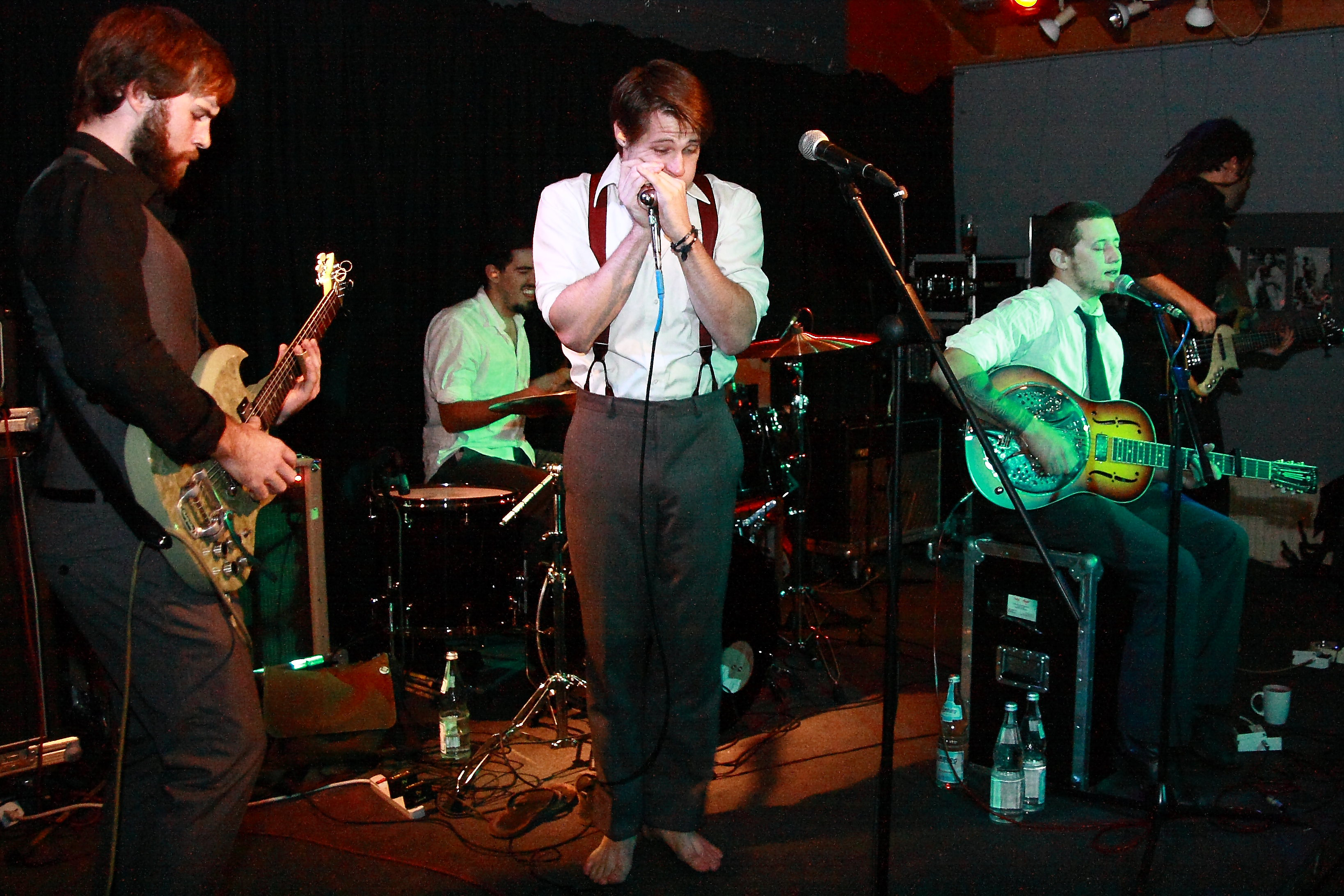
The Delta Saints at Club W71 (Weikersheim, Germany) in 2011.

The band began touring internationally throughout North America and Europe in 2011. They appeared on German television in October 2011 in Rockpalast, performing in Bonn. A DVD of their concert in Bonn was later released in 2012.

The France-based blues label Dixiefrog Records combined the two EPs into one self-titled album, The Delta Saints, released in 2011.

=== Crowdfunding ===
The band released Death Letter Jubilee in February 2013. The album was financed through crowdfunding using Kickstarter.

The Delta Saints played as the opening band for Blackberry Smoke in 2014, whilst promoting the Death Letter Jubilee album. The tour with Blackberry Smoke included Orlando, Florida (USA).

=== Loud and Proud records ===
In 2014, they released another EP, called Drink it Slow, and a live record, Live at Exit/In, which was recorded in two days at Exit/In in Nashville. In 2015, the band released the studio album Bones through Loud & Proud Records.

In September 2015 they toured Europe again.

=== Monte Vista ===
The band independently released the album Monte Vista on April 28, 2017. Monte Vista was recorded in six days at the Sound Emporium in Nashville and was produced by Eddie Spear. The band also partnered with PledgeMusic for the release.

== Discography ==
- 2009: Pray On
- 2011: A Bird Called Angola
- 2011: The Delta Saints
- 2012: Rockpalast "Live from Bonn, Germany" (DVD)
- 2013: Death Letter Jubilee
- 2015: Bones
- 2017: Monte Vista

== Reception and music style ==
Andreas Schiffman from musikreviews.de wrote: "the music of these young men sounded positively old". During a 2015 interview on the CBC program Studio Q, singer-songwriter Chrissie Hynde praised the group after touring with them in the USA, describing them as "the best band I've heard in ten years".

Jochen v. Arnim (Rock Times) describes their style as blues, soul and roots.

The band says their style is influenced by Led Zeppelin and the Allman Brothers.
