= Erin McCarley =

American singer-songwriter

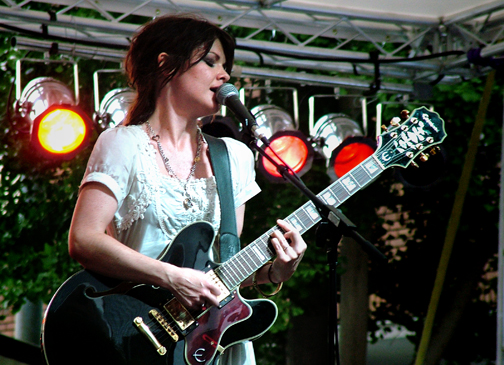

Background information
- Born: January 8, 1979 (age 47); Garland, Texas, United States
- Genres: Adult alternative
- Occupations: Musician, singer-songwriter
- Instruments: Vocals, guitar, omnichord
- Labels: Universal Motown, Universal Republic, Republic
- Website: erinmccarley.com

Erin Elizabeth McCarley (born January 8, 1979) is an alternative music singer-songwriter. McCarley attended college at Baylor University, and is now based in Nashville, Tennessee. She has been compared to Sara Bareilles, Regina Spektor, and Sheryl Crow. Erin released her follow-up to 2009's Love, Save the Empty on August 28, 2012, titled My Stadium Electric.

== Biography ==
=== Beginning of Musical Career ===
McCarley began her musical career in San Diego, where she'd moved after college to pursue a non-musical career. It was during this time that McCarley met producer/writer/keyboardist Jamie Kenney and the two began recording the songs that would become her debut album, Love, Save the Empty.

=== Love, Save the Empty ===
In 2008, McCarley performed at the annual SXSW Music Festival where she was discovered by Universal Republic Records. Love, Save the Empty, was released digitally on December 30, 2008 via iTunes, debuting #86 on the Billboard Top 200 Album Chart. A physical album followed on January 6, 2009. The first single from the album, "Pony (It's OK)" was the iTunes Single of the Week for the first week of 2009.

During 2008, she was part of the "Hotel Café Tour" playing across the United States. She was also part of the "Ten Out of Tenn" tour in Winter 2008/2009. McCarley spent 2009 on the road with various musicians including Brett Dennen, James Morrison, Paolo Nutini and Mat Kearney. In May 2013, she performed the song "Re-arrange Again" with K.S. Rhoads at the Oslo Freedom Forum in Oslo, Norway.

=== My Stadium Electric ===
On August 28, 2012, McCarley's second album, My Stadium Electric, was released exclusively to iTunes. "Amber Waves" was promoted as the iTunes Single of the Week.

=== Influences ===
Near the top of the list of McCarley's favorite artists are names like Fiona Apple, Patty Griffin and Greg Laswell (the latter of whom co-wrote "Bobblehead").

== Discography ==
=== Albums ===
- Love, Save the Empty – January 6, 2009 (iTunes, December 30, 2008)

No.	Title	Length
1.	"Pony (It's OK)"	3:26
2.	"Blue Suitcase"	3:28
3.	"Sticky-Sweet"	3:27
4.	"Lovesick Mistake"	4:15
5.	"Love, Save the Empty"	3:16
6.	"It's Not That Easy"	4:22
7.	"Hello/Goodbye"	3:58
8.	"Pitter-Pat"	4:19
9.	"SleepWalking"	3:32
10.	"Bobble Head"	3:22
11.	"Gotta Figure This Out"	4:48
12.	"Pony (It's OK)" (acoustic bonus track)	3:25
Total length:		45:38

- My Stadium Electric – September 4, 2012 (iTunes, August 28, 2012)

No.	Title	Length
1.	"Elevator"	3:33
2.	"You're Not That Someone"	3:22
3.	"What I Needed"	3:38
4.	"Pop Gun"	2:45
5.	"Vertigo"	3:17
6.	"Re-Arrange Again"	4:04
7.	"Fever"	3:32
8.	"There's No Holding You Down"	3:29
9.	"Survey"	3:45
10.	"Amber Waves"	4:14
11.	"Just Another Day"	3:03
12.	"Hush Hush"	3:47
Total length:		42:29

- Yu Yī – September 8, 2017

No.	Title	Length
1.	"G O O D"	3:57
2.	"Diediedie"	3:17
3.	"Cherry Tree" (featuring RUSLAN)	3:58
4.	"Dignity"	3:12
5.	"Send Me on My Way"	3:38
6.	"Sexy. Electric. Respected."	3:50
7.	"We Got the World"	3:33
8.	"Sexicon"	3:47
9.	"Out of the Fog"	4:19
10.	"I Can Be Somebody"	4:16
Total length:		37:47

=== Singles ===
- "Pony (It's OK)" – 2008
- "Love, Save the Empty" – 2009
- "Pitter-Pat" – 2009
- "In My Veins Feat. Andrew Belle" (Andrew's Album The Ladder) – February 2010
- "Every Subway Car Feat Barenaked Ladies" (Barenaked's Album All in Good Time) – March 2010
- "Amber Waves" – 2012
- "Out Of The Fog" – 2015
- "G O O D" – 2016
- "DieDieDie" – 2017
- "DIGNITY" – 2017
- "Blackout" – 2017
- "I Won't Let You Down" – 2017
- "Everywhere Ghosts Hide" – 2018
- "Fight to Feel Alive" – 2020

=== Guest appearances ===
- Trent Dabbs – Off We Go (Transition, Ready. Set. Records! | August 6, 2010)
- Joshua Radin – They Bring Me To You (Simple Times, Mom & Pop Music Co. | September 9, 2008)

=== Music videos ===
- "Love, Save the Empty" – Watch the Video Here

=== Compilations ===
- Ten Out of Tenn Vol. 2 (2008) – "Pony (It's Ok)"
- Ten Out of Tenn Christmas (2008) – "Little Drummer Boy"
- He's Just Not That Into You (2009) – "Love, Save the Empty"
- Post Grad (2009) – "Pony (It's Ok)"

== Television performances ==
- Late Show with David Letterman – January 6, 2009
- The Tonight Show with Jay Leno – February 12, 2009
- The Late Late Show with Craig Ferguson – May 29, 2009 and April 20, 2010
