= Rayland Baxter =

American singer-songwriter

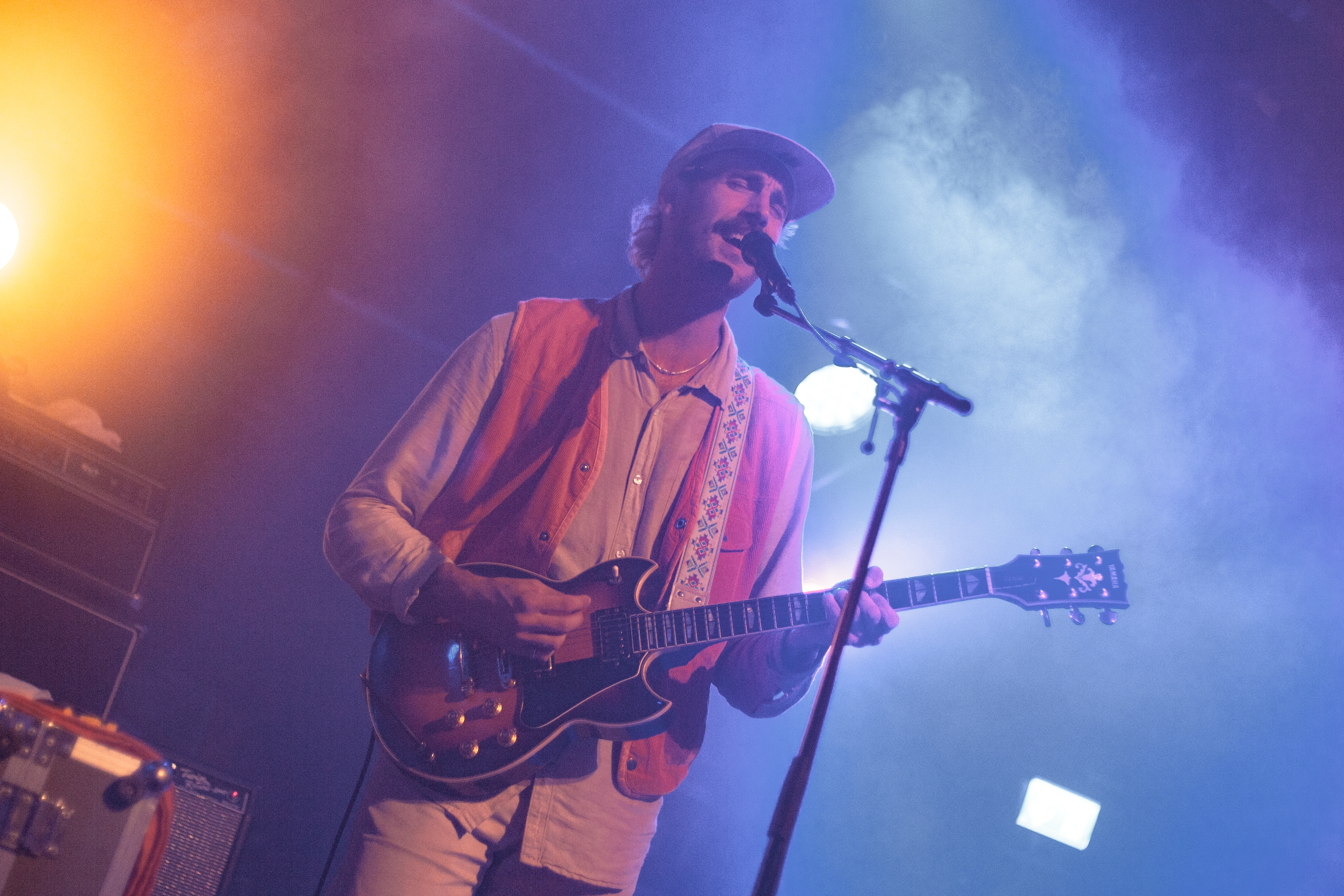
- Baxter in 2019

Background information
- Born: Rayland Baxter; September 26, 1983 (age 43)
- Origin: Nashville, Tennessee
- Genres: Alternative country, Americana
- Occupation: Musician
- Years active: 2010–present
- Website: www.raylandbaxter.com

Rayland Baxter (stylized as rayLand baxter) is an American alternative country musician from Nashville, Tennessee. He is currently signed to ATO Records. Baxter is the son of musician Bucky Baxter.

== Early life ==
Baxter excelled as a lacrosse player in high school as a midfielder. He attended the Severn School in Maryland and later Suffield Academy in Connecticut. He played Division I Lacrosse at Loyola University in Maryland before a knee injury ended his playing career. He was expelled from Loyola his sophomore year for getting in a fight on campus. In Baltimore, Baxter worked as a bartender at Jerry's Belvedere before moving to Colorado to work as a snowboard instructor in Breckenridge. There he began playing open mics at Gold Pan Saloon, starting his music career before eventually moving back to his hometown of Nashville to pursue music full time.

== Career ==
Baxter began performing in 2010, when he was featured on the song "Shanghai Cigarettes" by country musician Caitlin Rose. In 2012, Baxter released his debut full-length album, Feathers & Fishhooks (stylized as feathers & fishHooks), via ATO Records. In 2013, Baxter released his first extended play, Ashkelon (stylized as ashkeLON) also via ATO Records. The title is named after the town Ashkelon in Israel where he spent a pivotal time of his life. On August 14, 2015, Baxter released his second studio album, Imaginary Man. In 2018, Baxter released his third full-length album, Wide Awake. In 2019, Baxter released Good Mmornin, an album of seven covers of Mac Miller songs. The record was released the day before he played the Newport Folk Festival, where he performed several of the songs live for the first time. Baxter's fourth studio album, If I Were A Butterfly, was released on November 4, 2022. Baxter's fifth studio album, True Violet, was released on October 23, 2026, on ATO Records.

== Discography ==
=== Albums ===
| Title | Release details |
|---|---|
| Feathers & Fishhooks | Released: August 28, 2012; Label: ATO Records; Formats: LP, CD, digital download, streaming |
| Imaginary Man | Released: August 14, 2015; Label: ATO Records; Formats: LP, CD, digital download, streaming |
| Wide Awake | Released: July 13, 2018; Label: ATO Records; Formats: LP, CD, digital download, streaming |
| Good Mmornin | Released: July 26, 2019; Label: ATO Records; Formats: LP, CD, digital download, streaming |
| If I Were a Butterfly | Released: November 4, 2022; Label: ATO Records; Formats: LP, CD, digital download, streaming |
| True Violet | Released: October 23, 2026; Label: ATO Records; Formats: LP, CD, digital download, streaming |

=== EPs ===
| Title | Release details |
|---|---|
| Ashkelon | Released: August 20, 2013; Label: ATO Records; Formats: Vinyl, digital download, streaming |
| Soho | Released: February 5, 2016; Label: ATO Records; Formats: Vinyl, CD, digital download, streaming |
