= Griffin House (musician) =

American singer-songwriter

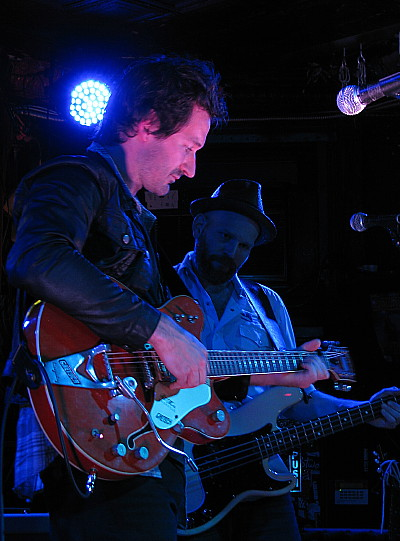
- Griffin House performing at The Saint in Asbury Park, New Jersey, in April 2013

Background information
- Born: April 21, 1980 (age 44)
- Origin: Springfield, Ohio, U.S.
- Genres: Folk, pop/rock, acoustic, adult alternative
- Occupation(s): Musician, songwriter
- Instrument(s): Singing, guitar
- Years active: 2001-present
- Labels: Nettwerk America, Evening
- Website: www.griffinhousemusic.com

Griffin House (born April 21, 1980) was born and raised in Springfield, Ohio. His father worked in a tire shop and his mother helped place children with foster families. In high school, the athletically gifted House landed a role in a musical and was surprised to learn that he had a natural talent for singing. House bought his first guitar for $100 from a friend, turned down a golf scholarship to Ohio University and instead went to Miami University in Oxford, Ohio and started to teach himself how to play the guitar and write songs.

House began writing and recording and issued his first independent release, Upland, in 2003. His music attracted attention from Nettwerk, a Vancouver-based management company and record label, and House partnered with the label's American branch to issue Lost & Found in 2004. In August 2004, on CBS Sunday Morning, music journalist Bill Flanagan (MTV/VH1) raved about Lost and Found, putting the newcomer on his short list of the best emerging songwriters in the U.S. “I bought House’s CD after a show in New York City,” said Flanagan, “and this never happens: I took it home and must have listened to it 20 times that weekend. I was knocked out.”

Several self-released albums followed, and in 2007 House released Flying Upside Down, produced by Jeff Trott and featuring Mike Campbell and Benmont Tench. House has released the majority of his records on his imprint label, Evening Records. House has toured extensively, opening for artists such as Ron Sexsmith, Patti Scialfa, Josh Ritter, John Mellencamp, Mat Kearney, and The Cranberries. Since 2007, House has been a national headliner.

He lives in Darien, Connecticut.

== Discography ==
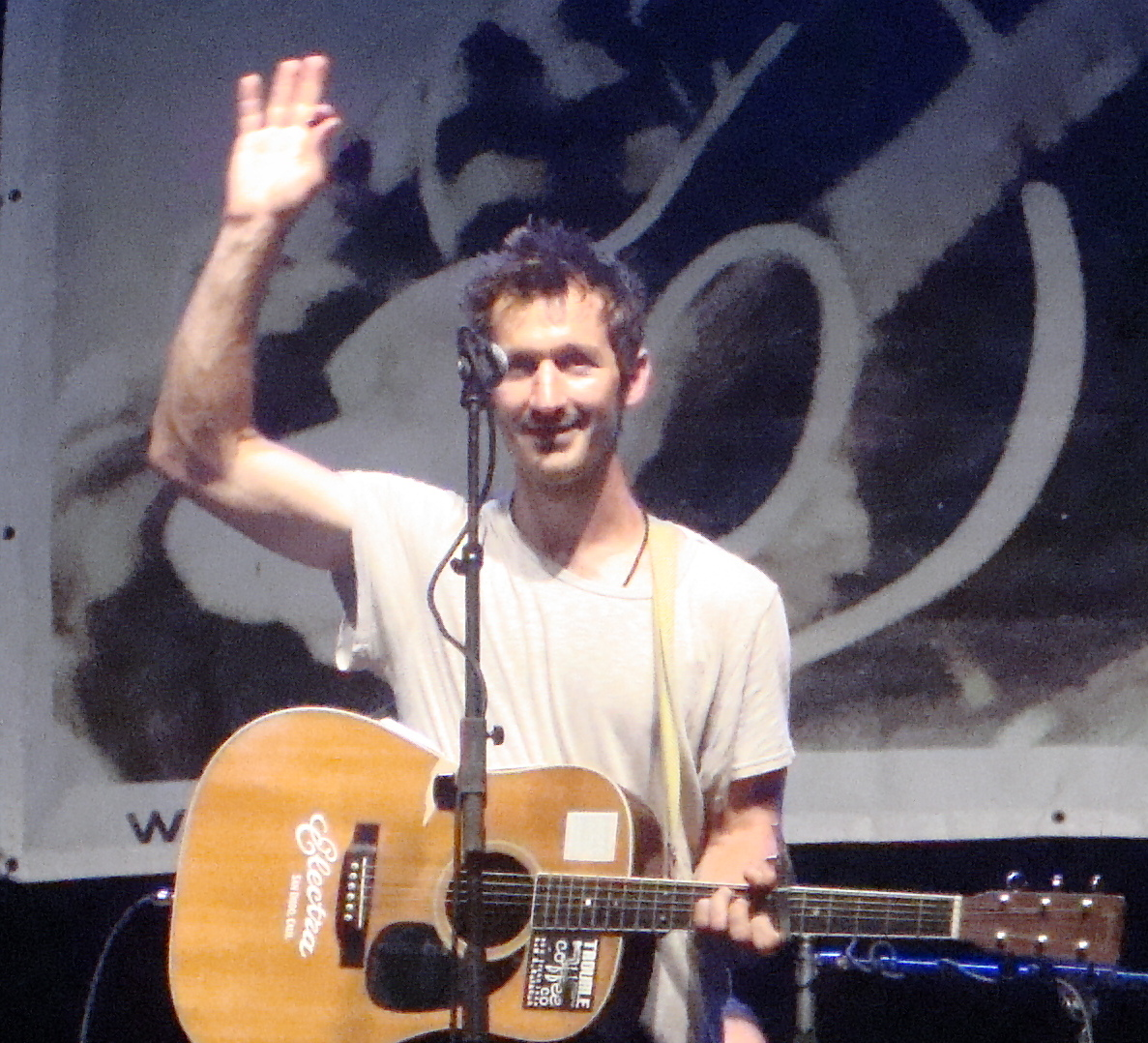
House performing at the Woody Guthrie Folk Festival in July 2013

- No More Crazy Love Songs (2002)

1. "Need Love in the Middle of the Day"
2. "Tom's Song"
3. "No More Crazy Love Songs"
4. "Now I Feel Fine"
5. "Heaven Now"
6. "Emma Bee"
7. "Kate"
8. "Miner"
9. "Just in Time"
10. "Rosemary Blue"
11. "Thee"

- Upland (2003, Evening Records)

1. "Waiting on Rain"
2. "No Instructions"
3. "The Way I Was Made"
4. "Tell Me a Lie"
5. "Waste Another Day"
6. "Broken"
7. "Volkswagon"
8. "Outside My Mind"
9. "Judas"
10. "Lay Down in Your Fields"
11. "Missed My Chance"

- Lost & Found (2004, Nettwerk America)

1. "Amsterdam"
2. "Ah Me"
3. "Tell Me a Lie"
4. "Waste Another Day"
5. "Waterfall"
6. "Liberty Line"
7. "The Way I Was Made"
8. "Why Won't You Believe?"
9. "Just a Dream"
10. "Missed My Chance"
11. "New Day"

- House of David, Volume One EP (2005)

1. "Crazy for You"
2. "Sinner"
3. "Say I Never"
4. "Traveling Thru America"
5. "One at a Time"
6. "Only Love Remains"

- House of David, Volume Two EP (2005)

1. "To You Someday"
2. "Skin"
3. "Lay Down in Your Fields"
4. "New York Times"
5. "Show Me Yourself"

- Homecoming (2006, Evening Records)

1. "Dance with Me"
2. "Never Again"
3. "Downtown Line"
4. "Czech Republic"
5. "Mirage"
6. "Burning Up the Night"
7. "Live to be Free"
8. "Ordinary Day"
9. "Lead Me On"
10. "The Guy That Says Goodbye to You is Out of His Mind"
11. "'Cause I Miss You"
12. "Only If You Need Me"
13. "Go Out on My Own"

- Flying Upside Down (2007)

1. "Better Than Love"
2. "I Remember (It’s Happening Again)"
3. "Let Me In"
4. "One Thing"
5. "The Guy That Says Goodbye to You Is Out of His Mind"
6. "Live To Be Free"
7. "Lonely One"
8. "Heart of Stone"
9. "Hanging On (Tom’s Song)"
10. "Flying Upside Down"
11. "When the Time Is Right"
12. "Good for You"
13. "Waiting for the Rain to Come Down"

- 42 and a half minutes with Griffin House (2009)

(B-sides and Commentary)

1. "Hudson Ohio"
2. "All I’ve Ever Known"
3. "Thalweg"
4. "So Wrong, So Right"
5. "An Uninspiring Stretch of Road"
6. "Parliament Lights"
7. "San Quentin"
8. "Murder in the First"
9. "The Waiting"
10. "Time"
11. "Covenant"
12. "I Won’t Leave"
13. "Self Diagnosis"
14. "Damn Day in My Shoes"
15. "No Deal Devil"
16. "Not For Sale"
17. "Hangin’ At The Studio"
18. "Give a Little Love"
19. "Last Thought"

- The Learner (2010)

1. "If You Want To"
2. "River City Lights"
3. "Standing at the Station"
4. "Just Another Guy"
5. "She Likes Girls"
6. "Never Hide"
7. "Rule the World"
8. "Gotta Get Out"
9. "Feels So Right"
10. "Let My People Go"
11. "Native"
12. "Coming Down the Road"

- Balls (2013)

1. "Fenway"
2. "Vacation"
3. "Go Through It"
4. "Guns, Bombs, and Fortunes of Gold"
5. "Real Love Can't Pretend"
6. "Woman With The Beautiful Hair"
7. "Colleen"
8. "Haunted House"
9. "The Passage"

- So On and So Forth (2016)

1. "Yesterday Lies"
2. "Games"
3. "Played the Fool"
4. "Straight in the Night"
5. "Paris Calling (Sweet Sensation)"
6. "Further"
7. "Stop and Rest"
8. "Easy Come Easy Go"
9. "A Painting by Hieronymus Bosch"
10. "Wrecking Ball"
11. "Silver Line"
12. "Omaha"

- Rising Star (2019)

1. "Rising Star"
2. "15 Minutes of Fame"
3. "Mighty Good Friend"
4. "When the Kids Are Gone"
5. "Hindsight"
6. "Hung Up On You"
7. "Cup of Fulfillment"
8. "Tell Me What You’re Made Of
9. "Natural Man"
10. "Crash And Burn"
11. "Change (Featuring Joy Williams)"

== Popular culture ==
- He recorded a cover of the Jackson Browne song, "These Days" for the Everwood soundtrack album. Both that song and "Amsterdam" were later featured in the show. He also is featured as a contributor to the Jackson Browne tribute album, "Looking Into You," singing "Barricades of Heaven."
- Nettwerk, House's sometimes-label, released a compilation called Love Is A Mixtape as a free internet download for Valentine's Day of 2007, featuring other artists such as Barenaked Ladies and Chantal Kreviazuk. His contribution was the Homecoming cut, "The Guy That Says Goodbye To You Is Out Of His Mind".
- His song "Waterfall" was featured in 2007 Rembrandt Oral Health commercial, nationally aired.
- His song "Just a Dream" appeared in Rescue Me.
- His song "The guy that says Goodbye to you.." is featured in the final scene of Brad Leong's 2007 Indie-gem "Palo Alto (2007 film)"
- His song "Better than Love" was featured in Season 5 of One Tree Hill and in the film Not Since You (2009) and the Japanese/American movie Memoirs of a Teenage Amnesiac
- His song "When the Time Is Right" was featured in the sixth episode of A Gifted Man and in the 4x22 episode of Brothers & Sisters.
