= Matthew Perryman Jones =

American singer and songwriter (born 1973)

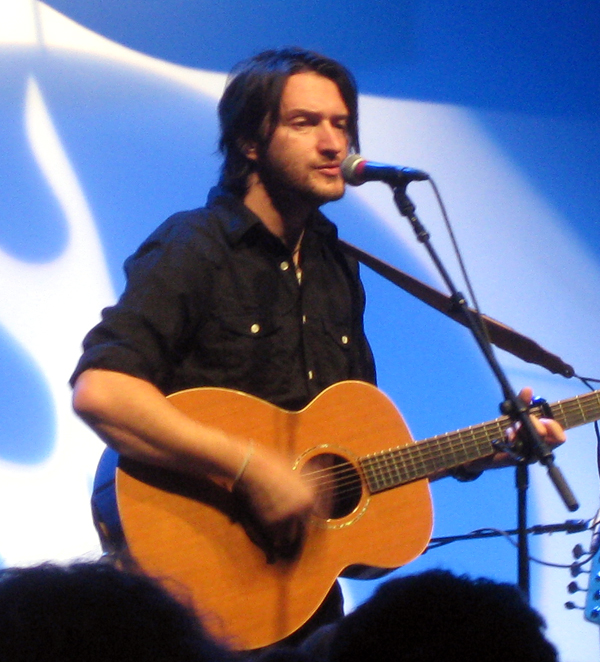
- Matthew Perryman Jones performing in 2008

Background information
- Born: December 25, 1973 (age 52)
- Origin: Levittown, Pennsylvania
- Genres: Pop rock, folk rock, indie
- Occupations: Singer, songwriter
- Years active: 1997–present
- Label: Independent
- Website: www.mpjmusic.com

Matthew Perryman Jones (born December 25, 1973) is an American singer and songwriter.

== Career ==
Jones began his music career in 1997, playing his first public performances at Eddie's Attic in Decatur, Georgia. In 2000, Jones issued his first solo release, Nowhere Else but Here, after moving to Nashville to pursue music full-time.

In 2006, he released the album Throwing Punches in the Dark. Produced by Neilson Hubbard, the album was a departure from his folk/Americana sound, instead moving toward pop rock.

In 2007, Jones performed at the Alabama Theatre in Birmingham, Alabama for the 10-year celebration of the syndicated radio program, Reg's Coffee House, sharing the stage with Stoll Vaughan, Jim James, and Patty Griffin. At this show, Jones first performed his song "Save You", which later brought Jones a high-profile after it appeared in an episode of Kyle XY.

In 2008, Jones teamed up with producer Neilson Hubbard to produce the album Swallow the Sea. Released August 19, 2008, the album included the single "Save You", gained traction in television and saw a growing number of placements in North American prime time television through 2012. The song's 2009 music video features Jaimie Alexander.

In 2010, Jones released two EPs: The Distance in Between, and Crash, Boom, Bang, which was released exclusively through NoiseTrade. Crash, Boom, Bang was a collection of songs either that did not make the cut on Swallow the Sea or were not finished enough to be included.

Jones released his third full-length record, Land of the Living, on May 29, 2012. According to American Songwriter, the album was funded through Kickstarter by fans and was inspired by high art and philosophy, such as "Vincent van Gogh's letters to his brother, Theo van Gogh; Federico García Lorca's idea of Duende (a heightened sense of emotion, expression, and authenticity in music), and the writings of Persian poet and philosopher Rumi."

Jones released The Waking Hours in September 2018. The album was inspired by considering the time when his daughters will leave out on their own as adults.

In 2019, Jones's 2016 single "Living in the Shadows" was used in "Beyond the Aquila Rift", the seventh episode in the first season of the Netflix adult animated anthology web television series, Love, Death & Robots.

== Discography ==
=== Albums ===
- Nowhere Else But Here, 2000
- Throwing Punches in the Dark, March 7, 2006
- Swallow the Sea, August 19, 2008
- Until the Dawn Appears, March 8, 2011
- Land of the Living, May 29, 2012
- Cold Answer, July 22, 2015
- The Waking Hours, September 2018

=== EPs ===
- For the Road, 2003
- Crash, Boom, Bang (digital only release), 2010
- The Distance in Between, April 13, 2010

=== Singles ===
- "Where the Road Meets the Sun", May 15, 2009
- "Out of Reach", September 14, 2009
- "Until The Last Falling Star", October 12, 2010
- "Only You", October 21, 2010
- "Looking for You Again", November 1, 2011
- "Living in the Shadows", 2016
