= Railbird Festival =

Annual music festival in Lexington, Kentucky

- Genre: Bluegrass, country, Americana, folk, rock
- Locations: The Grounds at Keeneland, Lexington, Kentucky (2019, 2021); The Infield at The Red Mile, Lexington (2023–present)
- Years active: 2019, 2021, 2023–present
- Organizer: AC Entertainment (2019); C3 Presents (2020–present)
- Website: railbirdfest.com

Railbird Festival is a music festival that takes place in Lexington, Kentucky, United States. The event, held on either of two racetracks through the years (Keeneland and The Red Mile), is also known for its unique bourbon selections.

== History ==
The first Railbird Festival was held on August 10–11, 2019, at Keeneland.

In 2020, a lineup was announced for August, before the event was cancelled because of the COVID-19 pandemic.

2021 saw the return of Railbird to Keeneland, but also a substantial increase in ticket sales. A ban of outside drinks led to festival attendees' waiting in lines for water for over an hour in "miserably hot" conditions. These issues led to a one-year hiatus and change of venue for the festival.

In 2023, the third Railbird Festival was held at The Red Mile.

== Lineups ==
=== 2019 ===
Saturday, August 10
- The Raconteurs
- Brandi Carlile
- Old Crow Medicine Show
- Mandolin Orange
- Mavis Staples
- Robert Earl Keen
- Grace VanderWaal
- Ruston Kelly
- Billy Strings
- Low Cut Connie
- The Dip
- Devon Gilfillian
- Lillie Mae
- Lucie Silvas
- Justin Wells
- Ian Noe
- Joslyn & The Sweet Compression
Sunday, August 11
- Hozier
- Tyler Childers
- Gary Clark Jr.
- St. Paul and The Broken Bones
- Lucinda Williams
- I'm with Her
- Drew Holcomb and the Neighbors
- Jade Bird
- Blackfoot Gypsies
- The Wooks
- Susto
- Futurebirds
- Fruit Bats
- Yola
- Johnny Conqueroo
- Kelsey Waldon
- Ona

=== 2021 ===
Saturday, August 28
- My Morning Jacket
- Leon Bridges
- Billy Strings
- Black Pumas
- Midland
- Margo Price
- Japanese Breakfast
- Joy Oladokun
- Sarah Jarosz
- John Moreland
- Briston Maroney
- Sierra Ferrell
- The Brook & The Bluff
- Bendigo Fletcher
- Magnolia Boulevard
- Nicholas Jamerson
Sunday, August 29
- Dave Matthews Band
- Jason Isbell and the 400 Unit
- Khruangbin
- The Revivalists
- Band of Horses
- Tanya Tucker
- Colter Wall
- The War and Treaty
- Pinegrove
- Zach Bryan
- Liz Cooper & The Stampede
- Cedric Burnside
- Cha Wa
- S.G. Goodman
- Southern Avenue
- Grayson Jenkins

=== 2023 ===
Saturday, June 3
- Zach Bryan
- Weezer
- Marcus Mumford
- Whiskey Myers
- Sheryl Crow
- Charley Crockett
- Jenny Lewis
- Lucius
- Morgan Wade
- Valerie June
- Dehd
- Neal Francis
- The Heavy Heavy
- Madeline Edwards
- The Local Honeys
- Wayne Graham
Sunday, June 4
- Tyler Childers
- Nathaniel Rateliff and The Night Sweats
- The Head and the Heart
- Goose
- Nickel Creek
- Amos Lee
- Ricky Skaggs & Kentucky Thunder
- Sierra Ferrell
- Charles Wesley Godwin
- Molly Tuttle & Golden Highway
- 49 Winchester
- Town Mountain
- Cole Chaney
- Flipturn
- Calder Allen
- Brit Taylor

=== 2024 ===
Saturday, June 1
- Noah Kahan
- Turnpike Troubadors
- Counting Crows
- Wynonna Judd
- Marcus King
- Trampled by Turtles
- Flatland Cavalry
- Benjamin Tod & Lost Dog Street Band
- Sam Barber
- Josiah & The Bonnevilles
- Katie Pruitt
- Ryan Beatty
- Brittney Spencer
- Kaitlin Butts
- Abby Hamilton
- Brother Smith
Sunday, June 2
- Chris Stapleton
- Hozier
- Lord Huron
- Dwight Yoakam
- Elle King
- The Red Clay Strays
- Johnnyswim
- Allison Russell
- The Infamous Stringdusters
- Nolan Taylor
- Hailey Whitters
- Kip Moore
- Brent Cobb
- Tanner Ursey
- Stephen Wilson Jr.
- Buffalo Wabs & The Price Hill Hustle

=== 2025 ===
Saturday, May 31
- Lainey Wilson
- Bailey Zimmerman
- Shaboozey
- Cody Jinks
- Sierra Ferrell
- Wyatt Flores
- Luke Grimes
- Larkin Poe
- Richy Mitch & The Coal Miners
- Ruston Kelly
- Josh Meloy
- Maggie Antone
- Sierra Hull
- Infinity Song
- Rattlesnake Milk
- Mama Said String Band
Sunday, June 1
- Jelly Roll
- Riley Green
- The Red Clay Strays
- Ryan Bingham & The Texas Gentlemen
- Treaty Oak Revival
- Gavin Adcock
- Blackberry Smoke
- Thee Sacred Souls
- Max McNown
- Ole Go
- Jesse Welles
- The Castellows
- Christone "Kingfish" Ingram
- Chaparelle
- Bendigo Fletcher
- Noeline Hofmann
- Mojo Thunder

=== 2026 ===
Saturday, June 6
- The Lumineers
- Caamp
- Mt. Joy
- Sam Barber
- Stephen Wilson Jr.
- Watchhouse
- The Wallflowers
- Robert Earl Keen
- Waylon Wyatt
- Mountain Grass Unit
- Hazlett
- Ken Pomeroy
- Laci Kaye Booth
- Sons of Habit
- John R. Miller
- Colton Bowlin
Sunday, June 7
- Tyler Childers
- Zach Top
- Ella Langley
- Muscadine Bloodline
- Houndmouth
- Shane Smith and The Saints
- Shakey Graves
- Margo Price
- Evan Honer
- Willow Avalon
- Braxton Keith
- The Creekers
- Kashus Culpepper
- Carter Faith
- Nicholas Jamerson & The Morning Jays
- Tyce Delk

=== Cancelled festivals ===
==== 2020 ====
Saturday, August 22–Sunday, August 23
- Jason Isbell and the 400 Unit
- Maren Morris
- The Head and the Heart
- Young the Giant
- The Decemberists
- Tanya Tucker
- Trampled by Turtles
- Colter Wall
- Whiskey Myers
- Shovels & Rope
- City and Colour
- The Dead South
- Cat Power
- The War and Treaty
- Hayes Carll
- Sarah Jarosz
- Lost Dog Street Band
- Cedric Burnside
- Bonny Light Horseman
- John Moreland
- Town Mountain
- Liz Cooper & The Stampede
- Paul Cauthen
- The New Respects
- Magnolia Boulevard
- Southern Avenue
- Caitlyn Smith
- The Brook & The Bluff
- Senora May
- Bendigo Fletcher
- Nicholas Jamerson
- Grayson Jenkins
