= Hinterland Music Festival =

Annual music festival held in Iowa

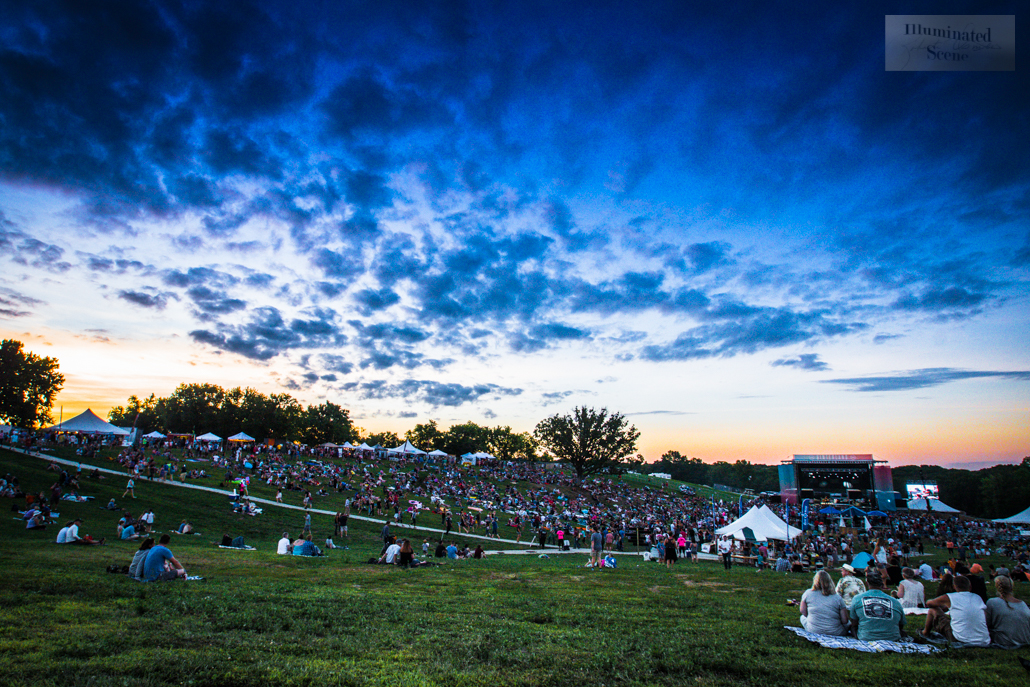
- Hinterland 2016
- Dates: Late July and Early August
- Frequency: Annually
- Locations: St. Charles, Iowa
- Coordinates: 41.2979°N 93.7873°W
- Years active: 2015–present
- Founders: Sam Summers
- Most recent: August 2025
- Website: Official Festival Website

Hinterland Music Festival is a multi-day music festival held at the Avenue of the Saints Amphitheater in St. Charles, Iowa, which was first held in 2015. The festival occurs annually in August and is the largest music festival in Iowa. In addition to live music, Hinterland features art, craft vendors, and camping.

== Background ==
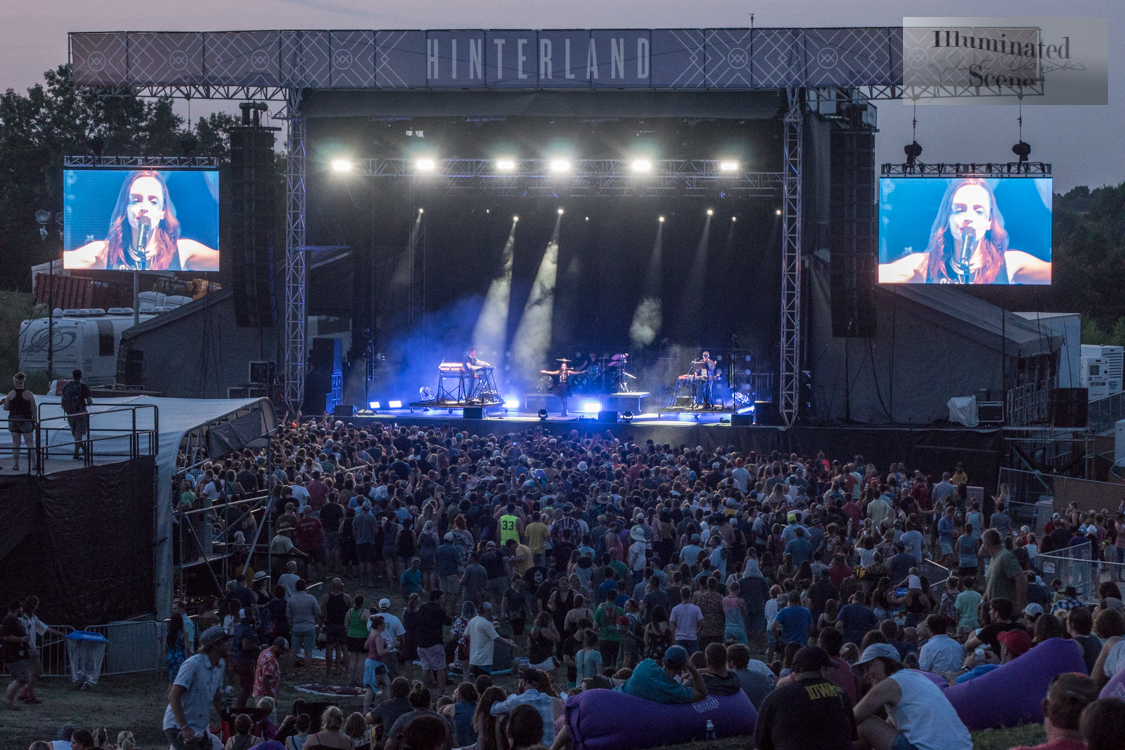
Hinterland 2016

The festival is organized by Sam Summers, co-owner of a local music venue and booker for a concert series. Water Works Park, located along the Raccoon River four miles southwest of Downtown Des Moines, was set to host for the first year. Its inaugural edition, however, was moved to St. Charles, twenty miles to the south, due to flooding concerns at the park. It drew a crowd of 14,000 over the two days. For 2016, the festival announced plans to return to St. Charles.

The festival expanded to three days in 2019.

Hinterland was canceled in 2020 due to the COVID-19 concerns.

The 2022 festival added a fourth day before scaling back to three days in 2023 until 2026 where they returned to a four day schedule.

== Lineups ==
=== 2015 ===
- Friday, July 31: The Envy Corps, TV on the Radio, Future Islands, Edward Sharpe and the Magnetic Zeros
- Saturday, August 1: Madisen Ward and the Mama Bear, Joe Pug, Justin Townes Earle, St. Paul and The Broken Bones, Lucius, Yonder Mountain String Band, Brandi Carlile, Old Crow Medicine Show

=== 2016 ===
- Friday, August 5: San Fermin, Houndmouth, Cold War Kids, Ray LaMontagne
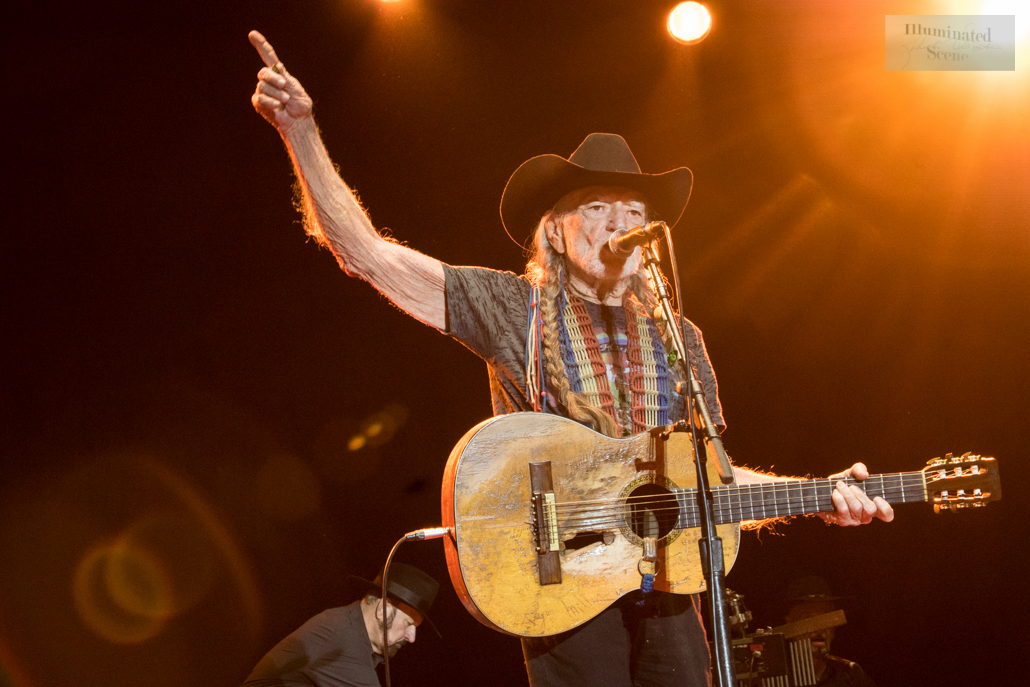
- Willie Nelson at Hinterland 2016
  Saturday, August 6: Field Division, William Elliott Whitmore, Pokey LaFarge, Hayes Carll, Turnpike Troubadours, Shovels & Rope, Lake Street Dive, Grace Potter, Willie Nelson

=== 2017 ===
- Friday, August 4: Annalibera, Foxygen, The Head and the Heart, alt-J
- Saturday, August 5: Max Jury, The Cactus Blossoms, JD McPherson, Nikki Lane, Shakey Graves, Dwight Yoakam, Gary Clark Jr., Ryan Adams

=== 2018 ===
- Friday, August 3: Ancient Posse, Tash Sultana, Chvrches, Band of Horses
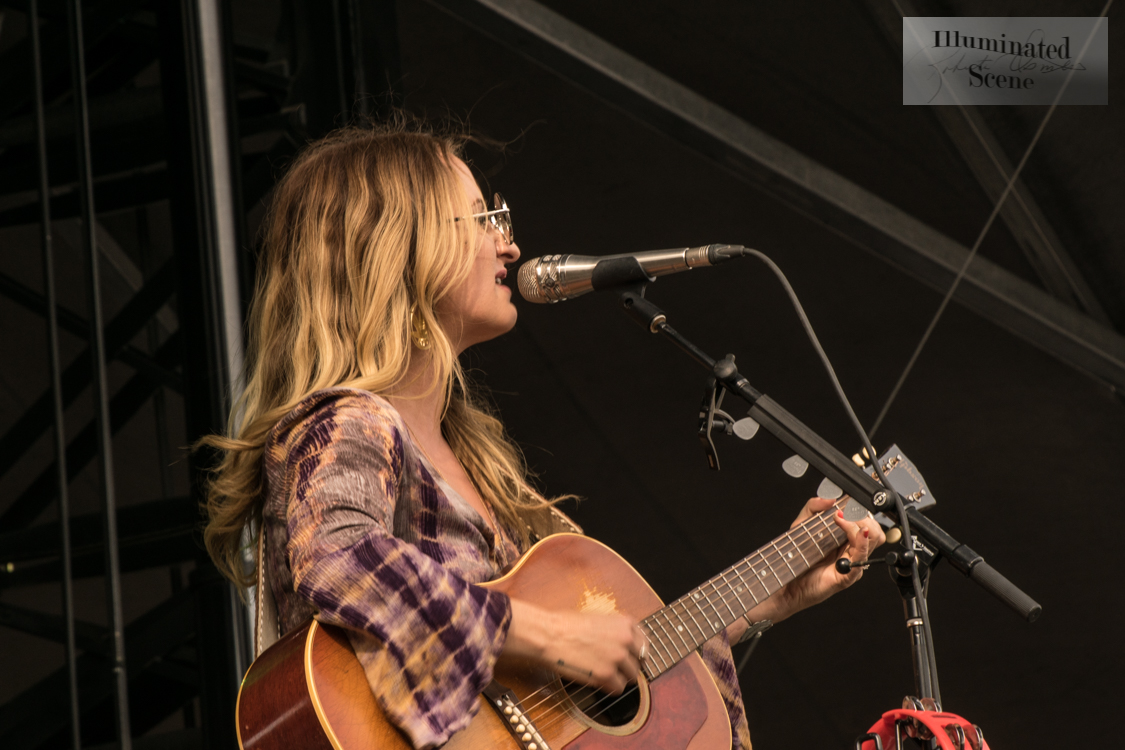
- Margo Price at Hinterland 2018
  Saturday, August 4: The Nadas, Joshua Hedley, Tyler Childers, J Roddy Walston and the Business, Anderson East, Margo Price, Blackberry Smoke, Nathaniel Rateliff and The Night Sweats, Sturgill Simpson

=== 2019 ===
- Friday, August 2: Keuning, Jade Bird, Hippo Campus, Kacey Musgraves, Hozier
- Saturday, August 3: Adam Bruce, The Maytags, John Moreland, Ron Gallo, The Dead South, Colter Wall, The Wood Brothers, St. Paul and The Broken Bones, Jason Isbell and the 400 Unit
- Sunday, August 4: Elizabeth Moen, The Nude Party, Ruston Kelly, The War and Treaty, Brent Cobb, Dawes, Maggie Rogers, Brandi Carlile

=== 2021 ===
- Friday, August 6: Hex Girls, Shura, Yola, Caamp, Old Crow Medicine Show, The Avett Brothers
- Saturday, August 7: Lillie Mae, Kelsey Waldon, The Dip, Paul Cauthen, Shooter Jennings, Zach Bryan, The Marcus King Band, Tanya Tucker, Black Pumas, Tyler Childers
- Sunday, August 8: Vincent Neil Emerson, Bendigo Fletcher, Charley Crockett, Hamilton Leithauser, Orville Peck, Elle King, Mt. Joy, Khruangbin, Leon Bridges

=== 2022 ===
- Thursday, August 4: Nick Shoulders, Riddy Arman, The Texas Gentleman, Sierra Ferrell, Billy Strings
- Friday, August 5: Yoke Lore, Petey, Goth Babe, Briston Maroney, The Aces, Turnstile, Glass Animals
- Saturday, August 6: Miko Marks, TK & The Holy Know-Nothings, Jesse Daniel, Mat Kearney, Durand Jones & The Indications, Jenny Lewis, Trampled by Turtles, Lake Street Dive, Nathaniel Rateliff & The Night Sweats
- Sunday, August 7: Hayden Pedigo, The Kernal, Tré Burt, Liz Cooper, Muna, Lucy Dacus, Kurt Vile & The Violators, Phoebe Bridgers

=== 2023 ===
- Friday, August 4: Skegss, The Regrettes, Houndmouth, Sylvan Esso, Bon Iver
  - Campfire Stage: Thomas Dollbaum, Marijuana Deathsquads
- Saturday, August 5: Pony Bradshaw, Riley Downing, Wilderado, Joy Oladokun, The Teskey Brothers, Angel Olsen, Noah Kahan, Zach Bryan
  - Campfire Stage: Sunny War, Richy Mitch & The Coal Miners
- Sunday, August 6: Yot Club, Spill Tab, Tomberlin, Del Water Gap, Faye Webster, Alex G, Wallows, Maggie Rogers
  - Campfire Stage: Savannah Conley, Field Medic

=== 2024 ===
- Friday, August 2: Debbii Dawson, Odie Leigh, Josiah and the Bonnevilles, Sam Barber, Hippo Campus, Orville Peck, Hozier
  - Campfire Stage: Model/Actriz, Molly Martin
- Saturday, August 3: Hans Williams, Blondshell, Richy Mitch & The Coal Miners, Madison Cunningham, The Red Clay Strays, Charley Crockett, Lizzy McAlpine, Vampire Weekend
  - Campfire Stage: Billy Woods, Waylon Wyatt
- Sunday, August 4: Palehound, Kate Kirby, The Last Dinner Party, Flipturn, The Japanese House, Chappell Roan, Ethel Cain, Mt. Joy, Noah Kahan
  - Campfire Stage: Jeremie Albino

=== 2025 ===
- Friday, August 1: Tyler, The Creator, Clairo, Remi Wolf, Royel Otis, Rebecca Black, Good Neighbours (duo), INJI, Scowl (band)
  - Campfire Stage: Rebecca Black (DJ Set), cdisiac
- Saturday, August 2: Kacey Musgraves, The Marías, Still Woozy, Role Model (musician), Glass Beams, Gigi Perez, Willow Avalon, Hey, Nothing
  - Campfire Stage: Nordista Freeze, Hembree, Little Engines Presents
- Sunday, August 3: Lana Del Rey, Bleachers (band), Sierra Ferrell, Wyatt Flores, Michael Marcagi, Evan Honer, Orla Gartland, Sam Austins
  - Campfire Stage: Gordi, Haffway

=== 2026 ===
- Thursday, July 30: KATSEYE, beabadoobee, ASHNIKKO, Audrey Nuna, Oklou, Jane Remover, Frost Children, Porch Light
  - Campfire Stage: Nourished by Time, Pixel Grip
- Friday, July 31: Lorde, MUNA, Snow Strippers, Paris Paloma, SOFIA ISELLA
  - Campfire Stage: Between Friends, Ninajirachi
- Saturday, August 1: Mumford & Sons, Jessie Murph, The Format, Santigold, CMAT, Waylon Wyatt, Amble, Julia Wolf (musician)
  - Campfire Stage: The Brook & The Bluff, Buffalo Traffic Jam
- Sunday, August 2: Kali Uchis, Young Miko, Geese (band), Wet Leg, Suki Waterhouse, Audrey Hobert, Samia, Haute & Freddy
  - Campfire Stage: Die Spitz, Gouge Away

=== 2027 ===
- Friday, July 30: Slayyyter, Remi Wolf, Ashe, Caroline Polachek, Tiffany Day, Florence Road, Violet Grohl, judith
- Saturday, July 31: Phoebe Bridgers, Malcolm Todd, The Backseat Lovers, underscores, Joshua Slone, Emma Ogier, Westside Cowboy, Kinji
- Sunday, August 1: Billy Strings, Zach Top, Stephen Wilson Jr., Avery Anna, Mon Rovîa, Medium Build, Wade Forster
