= Bowling Green station (Louisville and Nashville Railroad) =

Former railway station in Bowling Green, Kentucky

Bowling Green, KY
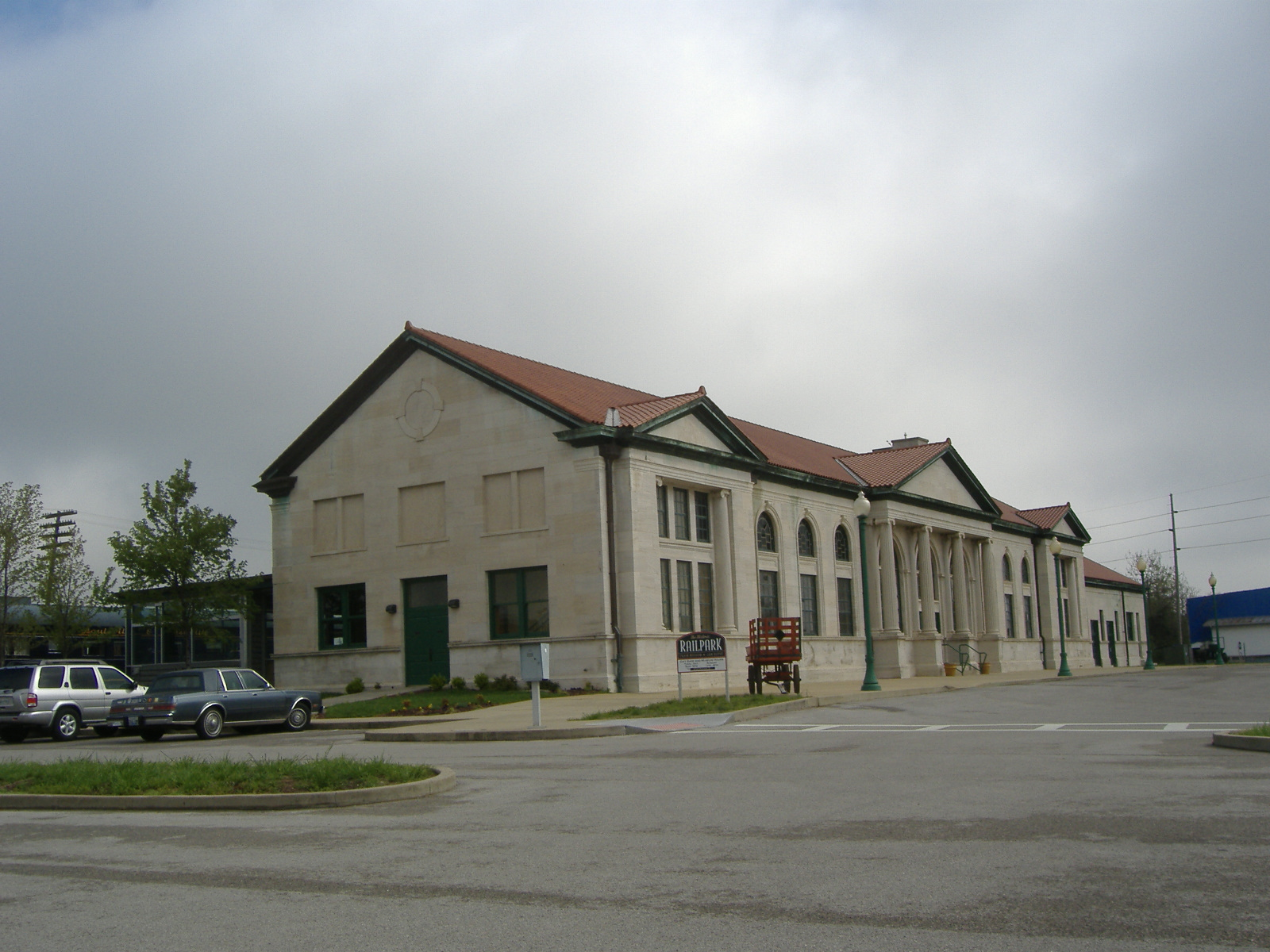
- The historic Louisville and Nashville Railroad station in 2008

General information
- Location: 401 Kentucky Street, Bowling Green, Kentucky; USA
- Coordinates: 37°0′0″N 86°26′17″W

History
- Opened: 1925
- Closed: 1979

Former services
Preceding station	Amtrak	Following station
Nashville toward St. Petersburg or Miami	Floridian	Louisville toward Chicago
Preceding station	Louisville and Nashville Railroad	Following station
Rich Pond toward New Orleans	Main Line	Bristow toward Cincinnati
Memphis Junction toward Memphis	Memphis – Bowling Green	Terminus
- Louisville and Nashville Railroad Station
- U.S. National Register of Historic Places
- Architectural style: Late 19th And 20th Century Colonial Revival
- MPS: Warren County MRA
- NRHP reference No.: 79003519
- Added to NRHP: December 18, 1979
Location

Bowling Green station is a former railroad station in Bowling Green, Kentucky. Opened in 1925, the standing depot is the third Louisville & Nashville Railroad depot that served Bowling Green.

== History ==
The first Bowling Green railroad depot was built in 1858 prior to the L&N's rails reaching Bowling Green. The rail line from Nashville reached Bowling Green on August 10, 1859. The line between Louisville and Nashville was complete on October 18, 1859, and was celebrated by 10,000 Nashvillians.

During the Civil War, the young L&N found itself to be a point of contention between the North and South. Kentucky was integral to the war and President Lincoln summed up the situation in this manner: "I think to lose Kentucky is nearly the same as to lose the whole game". Bowling Green was critical to both sides with its proximity to the Confederate state of Tennessee. The L&N branched just south of Bowling Green with routes to Clarksville, TN, and the line to Memphis, TN, opening the path to the Western war plans. By 1863 the L&N was the only railroad to cross both Union and Confederate Territories. The actions of L&N President James Gutherie resulted in a contentious relationship with the U.S. War Department, after the Battle of Perryville sealed Kentucky's alliance, but saved the L&N's future.

When the Confederates were forced to retreat from the city in February 1862, they burned downtown and all the supplies they could not carry, as well as the depot and trains. The Union troops occupying the city set about building a new depot. It was a wooden building and served the railroad and people of Bowling Green into the 20th century.

In 1878 malaria broke out from New Orleans to Memphis, Tennessee. Residents of Memphis wishing to escape the epidemic boarded the L&N trains, but residents from other towns refused to let them leave the train at their towns. Bowling Green's station was the first place they could leave the train, but enormous bonfires were built in order to deter infection. The evacuation of Memphis lasted a few days, until Memphis was quarantined.

By the 1880s, the depot was becoming too small to adequately serve all those who used it, and was in dire need of repair. However, the president of the L&N, Milton H. Smith refused to build a new station in Bowling Green after the citizens chartered a competing railroad, the Bowling Green & Ohio, that was to run east to Scottsville and connect with the Chattanooga & Ohio out of Gallatin, Tennessee. In retaliation, Milton Smith moved the railroad operations to Paris, TN, causing economic hardships for Bowling Green. Milton Smith died in 1921 and the current depot was opened with much fanfare October 2, 1925. It was constructed of limestone from the former White Stone Quarry located in southern Warren County, KY.

The L&N Railroad signed an exclusive contract with a taxicab company to pick up riders at the station so a rival company sued claiming an illegal monopoly in 1928. In Black and White Taxicab and Transfer Company v. Brown and Yellow Taxicab and Transfer Company, the United States Supreme Court upheld the contract.

By the early 20th century, local agricultural goods, such as strawberries and tobacco, were shipped from Bowling Green's depot, as well as locally mined building stone and oil. This made Bowling Green's L&N station the largest employment center in Warren County. During the 1930s and 1940s, the Bowling Green station was a stop for over 30 passenger trains, plus freight trains, on a daily basis. The L&N and other railroads operated the South Wind, which made a stop in Bowling Green.

=== Major named trains making stops at the station ===
- Azalean (Cincinnati to New Orleans, with Pennsylvania Railroad connection to New York City); one branch of the line split west to serve Memphis
- Humming Bird (Cincinnati to New Orleans)
- Pan-American (Cincinnati to New Orleans, with PRR connection to New York City); one branch of the line split west to serve Memphis

=== Decline ===
With the signing the Transportation Act in 1957 to create a national interstate road system and the burgeoning popularity of air travel, passenger service began to decline in the 1960s. Amtrak took over intercity rail service in 1971, and cut back service to a single train, the Chicago-Miami/St. Petersburg Floridian. and the last passenger train left the depot on October 6, 1979.

The building was placed on the National Register of Historic Places on December 18, 1979.

== Preservation ==
Left abandoned for many years and ownership passing through the hand of several private owners, the depot was saved from the wrecking ball by a group of concerned citizens. They transferred ownership to Warren Fiscal Court and the City of Bowling Green in 1997. Funding for renovations was acquired through the federal Transportation Enhancement program. The Depot Development Authority (DDA) was organized by the local government to oversee the twelve year, five phase, renovation process. Daily operations were under the oversight of Operation P.R.I.D.E., Bowling Green's beautification organization.

In 1999, the Bowling Green Public Library (now the Warren County Public Library) opened Kentucky's first Digital Library in the former train platform area. In 2002, the newly formed Historic Rail Committee located its first railcar on display tracks behind the depot. In 2007, the library relocated its services, Operation P.R.I.D.E. joined the City offices, and the Friends of L&N Depot (formerly the Historic Rail Committee) opened its museum and retail operations.

The Friends of L&N Depot, Inc., a 501(c)3 organization, manages the building operations through an agreement with the Warren Fiscal Court and City of Bowling Green, KY. The DDA was dissolved in 2008 having completed their assigned task of depot restoration.

== Museum ==
The L&N depot currently serves as the home for the Historic RailPark & Train Museum, with a two-story museum in the old colored waiting room, and special events venue space in the original white waiting room. Museum docents provide behind the scenes guided tours of the railcars, including several very rare railroad equipment. Current vintage cars on site include:

- L&N #796 locomotive - E8A replication the 4 locomotives ordered by the L&N from General Motors
- L&N #1107 Railway Post Office car - one of only two remaining L&N RPOs and one of only four complete RPOs in the US
- "Duncan Hines" Dining Car - originally a Southern Pacific dining car but renamed for the original L&N dining car
- L&N #3467 "Towering Pine" Pullman - one of only two remaining of the L&N's Pine sleeper series
- L&N #353 Office Car - built in 1911 and the oldest remaining intact L&N equipment
- Hospital Car #89456 - one of only four remaining of the original 200 commissioned by the US Army in 1942
- L&N #109 - pre-1911, one of only five known 3-section Jim Crow segregation cars; operated by the Glasgow Railway Company of Glasgow, KY
- L&N #6497 - formerly a Chessie System caboose

The museum is home to the award-winning sHOw Modular Model Railroad Club permanent model railroad exhibit. It also hosts the two-day "Festival of Trains" in first weekend in December.
