= Louisville and Nashville Railroad Office Building =

- U.S. National Register of Historic Places
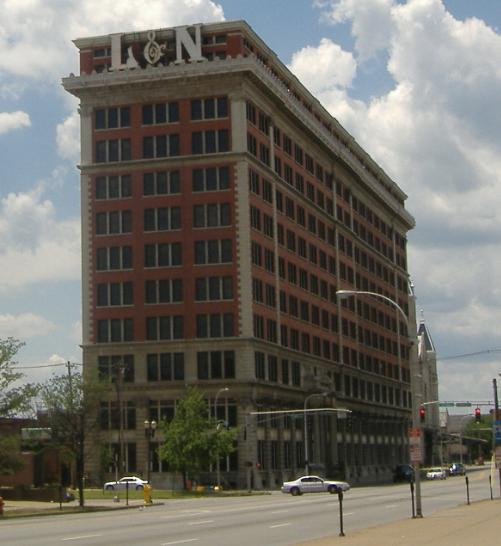

- Location within Kentucky Location within the United States
- Location: 908 W. Broadway; Louisville, Kentucky
- Coordinates: 38°14′48″N 85°46′02″W
- Area: less than one acre
- Built: 1907
- Architect: Haley, J. C. (architect or builder?) Courtenay?
- Architectural style: Beaux Arts
- MPS: West Louisville MRA
- NRHP reference No.: 83002696
- Added to NRHP: September 8, 1983

The Louisville and Nashville Railroad Office Building, at 908 W. Broadway in downtown Louisville, Kentucky, is a historic skyscraper building, built in 1907, which is listed on the National Register of Historic Places. It was once the headquarters of the Louisville and Nashville Railroad, a prominent railroad company from the mid-19th century to the 1970s.

== Architecture ==
The structure is eleven stories tall. The first three stories are made of stonework of rusticated ashlar, with capital-topped pilasters in a series. Floors four to ten have ashlar pilasters framing a finish of red brick. Windows of the building are done in series of three. The attic is 1.5 stories tall, and features the distinctive initials of the Louisville and Nashville Railroad.

It was designed by W. H. Courtenay, the chief architect of the Louisville and Nashville Railroad, in a Beaux Arts style; one of the largest commercial buildings in that architectural style still standing.

In 1930, an eight-bay western addition which duplicated the look of the original 10-bay building was added, built by then-current chief architect of the Louisville and Nashville Railroad J. C. Haley.

== History ==
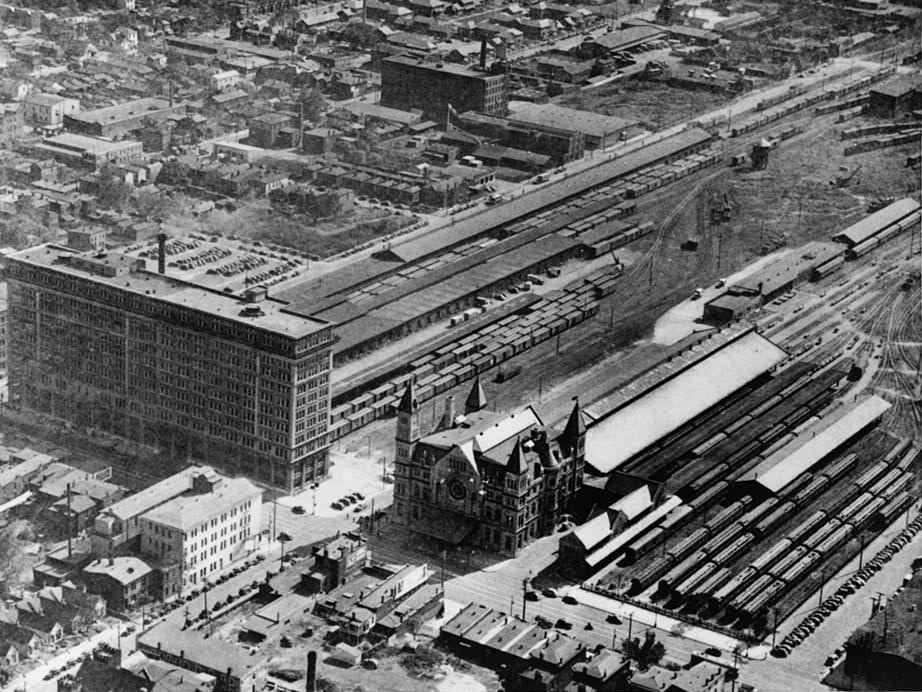
Aerial view of the L&N freight (left) and passenger (right) stations in the first half of the 20th century, showing the L&N Office Building and Union Station.

The original Louisville and Nashville Railroad offices in Louisville were at Second and Main in Louisville, by the entrance of present-day George Rogers Clark Memorial Bridge. By 1890, it had become obvious that the building was too overcrowded. It was decided that the office building should be located next to Louisville's Union Station. Construction began in 1902, but its completion was delayed until January 1907, due to difficulties with organized labor in a 1905 steel workers strike. Its total cost was $650,000. It was large enough that after decades of separation, all of the main administrative staff could be in the same building.

In the 1970s, about 2,000 L&N employees worked in the building. After L&N was purchased by CSX nearly all of the jobs were moved from Louisville to Jacksonville, Florida, in 1980. However, a 6-person CSX claims department stayed in the building until 1988.

Along with many other buildings, it was listed on the National Register of Historic Places in 1983 as result of a study of historic resources in West Louisville.

In 1984, the state of Kentucky spent $15 million to purchase and renovate the property, retaining the L&N name and neon lights on its upper stories.

In August 2009, the building was closed due to the 2009 Kentuckiana Flood, but would reopen as soon as deemed safe.

The building is currently the Louisville offices for the Kentucky Cabinet for Health and Family Services.
