= Josiah Leming =

American singer-songwriter (born 1989)

- Born: Josiah Donald Leming; March 26, 1989 (age 37)
- Genres: Folk; country; alternative
- Instruments: Vocals; guitar; piano; harmonica
- Years active: 2006—present
- Labels: Warner Bros.; Vagrant; Yucatan Records
- Website: josiahandthe.com

Josiah Leming (born March 26, 1989), also known by his stage name Josiah and the Bonnevilles, is an American singer-songwriter originally from Morristown, Tennessee. At the age of 17, Leming dropped out of high school and began traveling across the United States to play shows while living out of his car. After a brief stint on American Idol, he eventually caught the eye of executives at Warner Bros. Records who signed him to his first major label record deal in 2008. Leming recorded in London with Warner Bros. and released Angels Undercover EP and Punk Ass Rain EP before his debut album, Come On Kid, was released on September 13, 2010. Shortly after the release of his album, Leming and Warner Bros. went their separate ways. Leming continues to release music independently as Josiah and the Bonnevilles, and in 2024 completed his first ever sold out headlining tour.

== Biography ==
Josiah Leming was born in Morristown, Tennessee. He was raised by his mother and stepfather alongside four brothers and four sisters, six of whom are adopted. Leming first learned the piano when he was eight years old, after his mother purchased a Casio keyboard for nothing. He also played his grandmother's piano during visits to her house, and participated in school musicals and choirs. Described as "self-taught", he also credits an "elderly piano instructor" for his early musical education.

By 13, Leming was writing his own music. A friend introduced him to the music of DC Talk, Coldplay and Travis, Neil Young, Bob Dylan, Ryan Adams, and The Smiths at 15. They had some influence on Leming's musical style. When he was 16, Leming began to perform locally. He dropped out of high school and left Morristown at 17, in an attempt to both make it as a musician and find a way to support his large and struggling family. Leming played in clubs and coffeehouses throughout the Southeast while working at restaurants and temp agencies to pay for food and gas. He traveled to Atlanta, Georgia in late 2007 when he heard American Idol would hold auditions there.

== On American Idol ==
Leming is the only contestant in the history of American Idol to not make the 'Top 24' yet still land a major label record deal. He was a contestant on Season 7 of American Idol; the producers were interested in his life as a traveling musician living out of his car. In an interview with MTV News, Leming said he was disappointed with how they portrayed his life as a "sob story". "I wanted to stand on my voice, and my own two feet," he explained, "but they wanted to know about the story and they wanted to use it. I definitely wasn't going for the sympathy vote."

He became a popular contestant after singing his rendition of "Grace Kelly" by English singer Mika. However, Leming did not make it to the top 24 for his performance of "Stand by Me" by Ben E. King; Randy Jackson and Paula Abdul refused to side with Simon Cowell in his wish to see Leming advance to the semi-finals.

Leming later admitted the performance was poor. "I didn't know that song, so I was trying to make it my own, and I focused more on the words than the melody. And that's why it was kind of all messed up." He wanted to sing "Take Me Out" by Franz Ferdinand, but was not allowed to—Leming did not know why.

Cowell is on record saying that he feels it was a mistake not to put Leming through to the next round, having stated: "We should have put him through. I was all for it. I wanted him in the competition." Leming's controversial ouster is widely believed to be one factor behind the return of wild cards to the selection process in Season 8.

Leming's popularity grew after returning to Tennessee. He gained more followers on MySpace. In addition, many label representatives called him, and producers of The Ellen DeGeneres Show invited Leming to make a guest appearance, which he accepted. Leming signed a record deal with Warner Bros.

Leming's "To Run" is the only song written by an American Idol contestant to be covered in the Kidz Bop series.

== Musical career ==
In 2007, before his appearance on American Idol, Leming self-released The Paperplain EP and Her EP on his MySpace page for digital download. While unavailable on major streaming platforms for several years, Leming re-released these songs under First Demos in 2024.

=== 2008-2010: Record deal and first album ===
Leming signed a record deal with Warner Bros. in 2008 and began work on his debut album Come on Kid. To promote the album, Warner Bros. released Angels Undercover EP in 2008 and Punk Ass Rain EP in 2009. Meanwhile, Leming recorded Come on Kid in London and Los Angeles, with the help of producers Jesse Owen Astin, Martin Terefe, Warren Huart and David Kosten. "To Run" and "Arctic Outcry Wind", both songs from Angels Undercover EP, are featured with slightly different mixes on the album.

Come on Kid was released on September 13, 2010, after some delays. "It was emotional, and it took a long time," Leming tells Billboard.com. "In order to make an album that everybody was happy with, and also that I felt good about, it took the good part of two years to kind of wrangle that in." While these delays were rumored to have been caused by contract disputes with 19 Entertainment, both Leming and 19 now say that the "disputes" were simply a misunderstanding.

Come on Kid flopped commercially, which prompted Warner Bros. to drop Leming from the label in late 2010.

=== 2011: Another Life ===
Leming recorded music independently in Burbank, California before returning to Tennessee in early Fall 2011. He released a new single "What You've Taken" on February 6, 2011, in conjunction with the launch of his official website. The single was available on his website for free download until March 6, 2011.

Now an independent artist, Leming would play in different venues across the country to promote his music. In addition, Leming would perform a live internet broadcast on Stickam, performing songs and keeping his followers updated on the progress of his musical career.

During a live Stickam broadcast on July 24, 2011, Leming announced he would independently release his second album in September 2011; however, he later pushed the release date to November 2011.

In anticipation of his second album, Leming released three singles. One of Leming's most popular songs, "One Last Song" was selected as the debut single, after Leming had initially intended to release a version of the song on Come On Kid. One Last Song was released on September 24, 2011. The second single, "Too Young", was released on October 24, 2011, followed by "Another Life" on November 10, 2011.

Leming's independently-released second album, Another Life, was released on November 29, 2011.

=== 2013-2016: Josiah and the Bonnevilles and Cold Blood EP ===
In the summer of 2013, Leming completed the Listen Close tour. A live album from this tour was released on August 30, 2013. The album was a compilation of live renditions of old songs, new songs, and covers as performed by Leming on the Listen Close North America tour. Leming moved to Las Vegas.

On September 16, 2014, Leming released "Long Gone", the first single to come from this new material, and the first single under his new moniker Josiah and the Bonnevilles. Cold Blood EP was released on March 3, 2016.

Speaking about the new music, Leming told Pepperdine University's Graphic publication, "The content's kind of dark. All the songs came from the same period of time when I lived in Vegas alone. I was kind of withdrawn; I had gone through a breakup."

=== 2018-2021: Yucatan Records; On Trial and Motel Mayday ===
Josiah and the Bonnevilles did not release their debut album with Vagrant Records as anticipated, and instead signed with indie British label Yucatan Records in 2018, Their debut album, On Trial, was released on March 28, 2018. The follow-up album, Motel Mayday, was released on April 2, 2021 (with a commentary version released on April 30, 2021).

=== 2021-2022: Taking a break, Patreon, and Independent success ===
After Motel Mayday's release, Leming departed Yucatan Records and began working as a bartender in Nashville, Tennessee and later worked in an Amazon warehouse in Lebanon, Tennessee. During this time, Leming released demos of unheard music on Patreon, where he secured enough of a following to quit his job and once again pursue music as an independent artist.

Utilizing the popular social media platform TikTok, Josiah and the Bonnevilles was able to expand his following with covers of popular songs, such as Creed's "One Last Breath", Taylor Swift's "Anti-Hero", and Justin Bieber's "Ghost". Capitalizing on his reclaimed popularity, Leming announced he was working on new music, which he continued to preview for contributors of his Patreon.

On December 14, 2022, Josiah and the Bonnevilles released 2022, a compilation of singles that Leming released throughout 2022. Some of these tracks would later find their way onto future projects.

=== 2022-2025: Country Covers and Endurance ===
Country Covers was released on January 27, 2023. Josiah and the Bonnevilles' long-awaited next album Endurance was released on October 25, 2023. In November 2023, Josiah and the Bonnevilles sold out a three night run at 3rd and Lindsley in Nashville, Tennessee, which would catapult Leming into a North American-wide tour. The album's deluxe edition with seven new tracks was released on February 14, 2024.

Josiah and the Bonnevilles made their debut at the Grand Ole Opry on April 13, 2024, playing alongside country music stars such as Vince Gill and Carrie Underwood.

As of April 2024, Leming is back in his home studio in Nashville, Tennessee working on his follow-ups to Country Covers and Endurance.

On October 25, 2024, Leming released Country Covers II. The album includes collaboration with Trampled by Turtles, Wilderado and Richy Mitch & The Coal Miners.

== Discography ==
Album	Year of release
First Demos	2007
Angels Undercover (EP)	2008 (reached 26 on Top Heatseekers)
Punk Ass Rain (EP)	2009
Come On Kid	2010
Another Life	2011
Listen Close Live	2013
Cold Blood (EP)	2016 (as Josiah and the Bonnevilles)
On Trial	2018 (as Josiah and the Bonnevilles)
Motel Mayday	2021 (as Josiah and the Bonnevilles)
2022	2022 (as Josiah and the Bonnevilles)
Country Covers	2023 (as Josiah and the Bonnevilles)
Endurance	2023 (as Josiah and the Bonnevilles)
Endurance (Deluxe)	2024 (as Josiah and the Bonnevilles)
Country Covers II	2024 (as Josiah and the Bonnevilles)
As Is	2026 (as Josiah and the Bonnevilles)
