= Copper Changes Color =

Studio album by Caamp
- Released: June 6, 2025
- Studios: Sonic Ranch (Tornillo, Texas); Sear Sound (New York City); Flora Recording Studios (Portland, Oregon)
- Length: 35:40
- Labels: By and By; Mom + Pop
- Producers: Caamp; Beatriz Artola; Tucker Martine

Caamp chronology
Somewhere (2025)	Copper Changes Color (2025)

Copper Changes Color is the fifth studio album by the American folk band Caamp. It was released on June 6, 2025, by the band's own label By and By Music with distribution handled by Mom + Pop Music.

== Background ==
Copper Changes Color is Caamp's first studio album since the release of Lavender Days in 2022. This album was produced by the band themselves with additional production contributions by Beatriz Artola and Tucker Martine. The band recorded the album at Sonic Ranch in Tornillo, Texas, Sear Sound in New York City, and Flora Recording Studios in Portland, Oregon.

== Promotion ==
The album was preceded by the release of the lead single "Drive" on April 8, 2025. Mystic Sons wrote in their review of the song: "If Copper Changes Color promises to explore the passage of time and the inevitability of change, then 'Drive' is its ignition. It invites us in gently, without drama or fanfare, but with all the gravity of lived experience and a deepening artistic maturity. This is Caamp, not reinvented, but grown—seasoned by time, loss, and the slow turning of the seasons." The double second singles, "Mistakes" and "Fairview Feeling", were released on May 9, 2025.

== Critical reception ==
The Daily Northwestern was positive in their review of Copper Changes Color, and concluded their review by writing that the album's thesis statement was to "[remind] their listeners of the highs of falling in love, the hurt of heartbreak and the beauty that undergoing such changes can bring."

== Track listing ==
All tracks are written by Taylor Meier.

No.	Title	Length
1.	"Millions"	4:12
2.	"One True Way" (featuring Madi Diaz)	2:47
3.	"Brush"	2:25
4.	"Porchswing"	3:10
5.	"Fairview Feeling"	3:18
6.	"Shade"	3:37
7.	"Waiting Up (For You)"	2:37
8.	"Mistakes"	3:18
9.	"Ohio's Ugly"	3:38
10.	"Living & Dying In Between"	3:11
11.	"Drive"	3:27
Total length:		35:40

== Personnel ==
Credits and personnel for Copper Changes Color adapted from Tidal.

=== Caamp ===
- Taylor Meier - lead vocals (all tracks), background vocals (2-5, 9), composer, lyricist, acoustic guitar (1-6, 8, 9, 11), electric guitar (2, 6-8), piano (10)
- Evan Westfall - acoustic guitar (1), background vocals (5, 6, 9), banjo (1-5, 9), sampler (11)
- Matt Vinson - bass (1-9, 11), background vocals (2-7, 9)
- Joe Kavalec - organ (1), piano (2), keyboard (3-9, 11), background vocals (9)
- Nick Falk - drum kit (1, 4, 6-9), vibraphone (11), background vocals (7, 9), percussion (1, 4, 6, 7, 9)

=== Additional musicians ===
- Madi Diaz - vocals (2)
- Josh Block - drum kit (2, 3, 5), percussion (3, 5)
- Jay (Note: The identity of "Jay" is not specified in the album credits per Tidal.) - electric guitar (3, 4), background vocals (4)

=== Technical ===
- Caamp - production (all tracks)
- Beatriz Artola - production (1-3, 5, 8-10), co-production (4), engineering (1-5), mixing engineering (all tracks)
- Tucker Martine - production (2, 4, 6, 7), engineering (4, 6, 7, 11)
- Joe LaPorta - mastering engineering (all tracks)
- Steve Sacco - recording engineering assistance (1, 9, 10)
- Diego Mendoza - recording engineering assistance (2, 3, 5)
