= Lavender Days =

Studio album by Caamp
- Released: June 24, 2022
- Studio: Sylvan Esso's home studio (North Carolina); Caamp's home studio (Columbus, Ohio)
- Length: 39:26
- Label: By and By; Mom + Pop

Caamp chronology
Live from Newport Music Hall (2020)	Lavender Days (2022)	Copper Changes Color (2025)

Lavender Days is the fourth studio album by American folk band Caamp. It was released on June 24, 2022, independently by By and By Records with distribution handled by Mom + Pop Music.

== Background ==
The album was announced by Caamp on March 14, 2022 simultaneously with the release of lead single "Believe". The album was recorded in February 2021 at Sylvan Esso's private recording studio near Durham, North Carolina and the band's own recording studio in Columbus, Ohio.

== Singles ==
Lavender Days has been supported by three singles. The lead single, "Believe", was released on March 14, 2022. The song topped Billboard's Adult Alternative Airplay chart in June 2022. Caamp further promoted the song by performing it on ABC's Jimmy Kimmel Live! on July 11, 2022. The second single, "Apple Tree Blues", was released on April 14, 2022. The third and final single, "Lavender Girl", was released on May 20, 2022.

== Critical reception ==
Writing for AllMusic, James Christopher Monger rated the album three out of five stars, and wrote that the album "provides copious amounts of affirmation and comfort, even at its most wistful."

== Track listing ==
Lavender Days track listing
No.	Title	Length
1.	"Come with Me Now"	2:39
2.	"Believe"	3:15
3.	"The Otter"	2:58
4.	"Apple Tree Blues"	3:32
5.	"All My Lonesome"	4:03
6.	"Light"	3:38
7.	"Found (Forever)"	3:58
8.	"Lavender Girl"	3:23
9.	"Garden Song"	3:03
10.	"Fever"	3:25
11.	"Snowshoes"	3:24
12.	"Sure Of"	2:08
Total length:		39:26

== Charts ==
Chart performance for Lavender Days
Chart (2022)	Peak position
US Billboard 200	83
US Independent Albums (Billboard)	9
US Top Alternative Albums (Billboard)	6
US Top Rock Albums (Billboard)	15
