= Milton H. Smith =

American railroad executive

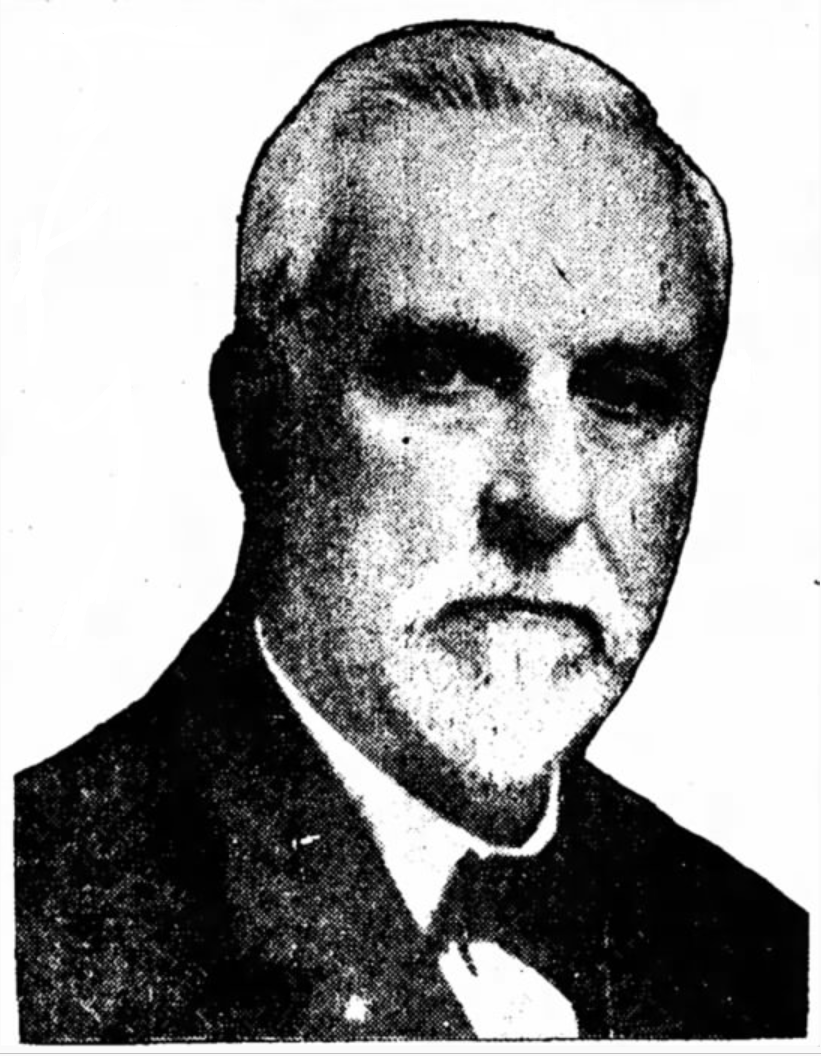
- Born: Milton Hannibal Smith; September 12, 1836; Chautauqua County, New York
- Died: February 22, 1921 (aged 84); Louisville, Kentucky
- Occupation: Businessman
- Employer: Louisville and Nashville Railroad

Milton Hannibal Smith (September 12, 1836 – February 22, 1921) was an executive of the Louisville and Nashville Railroad in the late 19th century, and was president of the road from 1891 to 1921.

== Biography ==
According to the 1896 Biographical Directory of the Railway Officials of America Smith was born in Chautauqua County, New York, on September 12, 1836.

Previous to 1868 he was successively telegraph operator and clerk, superintendent's office, Mississippi Central Railroad, Holly Springs, Mississippi, and with military railways in northern Alabama during the American Civil War, at the close of which he was appointed local freight agent, Louisville and Nashville, Louisville, Kentucky. About 1868 became general freight agent, same road, which position he held until October, 1878, from which time to October, 1881, was general freight agent Baltimore and Ohio Railroad; October, 1881, to January, 1882, general agent, Pennsylvania Railroad; January, 1882, to July, 1882, third vice-president and traffic manager, Louisville and Nashville; July, 1882, to 1884, first vice-president, same road; January, 1883, to August, 1884, general manager; August, 1884, to October 6, 1886, president; October 6, 1886, to March 9, 1891, vice-president, same road; March 9, 1891, to 1896, president, same road.

According to the New York Times, Smith was appointed master of transportation on all military railroads in the occupied South during the American Civil War. Smith was president of the "Old Reliable" from 1891 through 1921. During his thirty-year tenure, the Louisville and Nashville, according to the Times, became one of the greatest railroad systems in the South, a system encompassing five thousand track miles.

The Times notes that during an outbreak of Yellow Fever in Montgomery, Alabama, in 1878, the city quarantined all trains. In retaliation, Smith, as general freight agent, embargoed all traffic bound for Montgomery. "On appeal from Montgomery," Smith's Times obituary notes, "his superiors revoked the embargo order and Mr. Smith resigned." Thus began his service on two of the larger eastern trunk lines, first as general freight agent on the Baltimore and Ohio and then as general agent for the Pennsylvania Railroad in New York, New York.

Smith died of a heart attack at his home in Louisville after being ill for several weeks. He was 84 years old.

For his contributions to early American railroad management, Smith is listed by the Smithsonian Institutions' John H. White Jr., as one of America's most noteworthy railroaders.

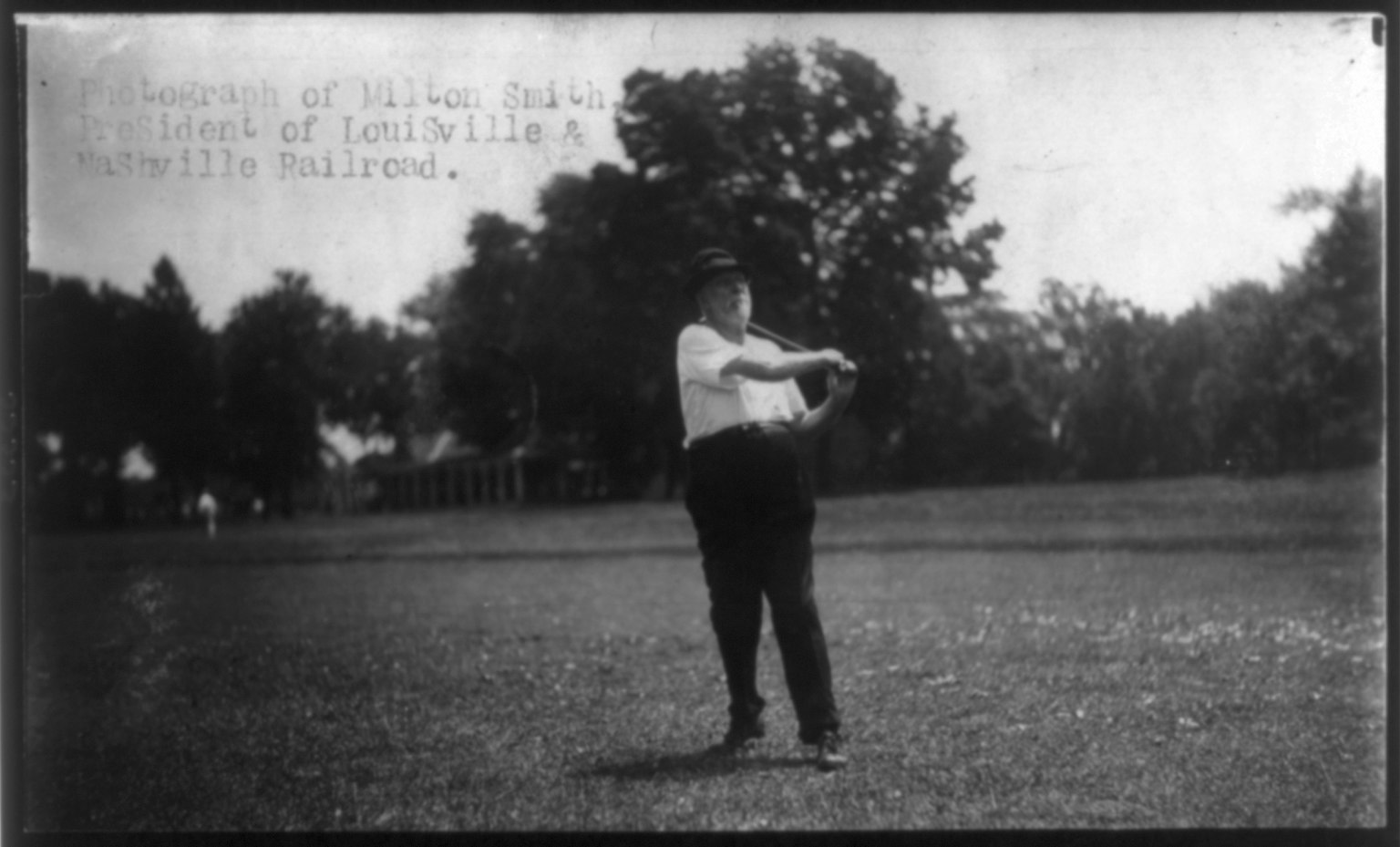
Smith playing golf
