= Nick Shoulders =

American country singer-songwriter (born 1989)

Background information
- Born: Nicklaus Robert Shoulders; August 19, 1989 (age 37); Little Rock, Arkansas, USA
- Origin: Fayetteville, Arkansas
- Genre: Progressive country
- Occupation: Singer-songwriter
- Instruments: Guitar, whistling, harmonica, drums, banjo, fiddle, mouth bow, vocals
- Label: Gar Hole

Nicklaus Robert Shoulders is an American country singer-songwriter from Fayetteville, Arkansas. After achieving local success with his punk rock band Thunderlizards in the early 2010s and playing harmonica and banjo with Shawn James and the Shapeshifters, in 2017 Shoulders began releasing country music as a solo artist.

== Early life ==
Nicklaus Robert Shoulders was born in Little Rock, Arkansas to parents Bob and Katherine (maiden name Riley). He grew up in Roland, Arkansas. Shoulders grew up in a music household, with both sides of his family being different types of musicians. He was a whistler as a boy. His father, also a whistler, taught him how to whistle. Shoulders' grandfather was also a whistler. His father taught him how to mimic the birds outside. His whistling helped him learn yodeling later on. Other than whistling and yodeling, he taught himself different instruments including drums, guitar, harmonica, and the violin.

He was raised Southern Baptist. His maternal grandpa, Pat M. Riley, was a gospel singer, which also inspired Shoulders. All of his grandparents on his mother and father's side were into music. He also learned warbling from a grandparent, and had a fiddle passed down to him.

== Career ==
He started in a local Fayetteville band called Thunderlizards, playing drums. The band was punk rock with some country elements and had a lot of political messages. After the band, he started working with Shawn James, another country singer and whistler, and played banjo for him. After touring with James, be began his solo work. His solo work has reached a much wider audience, beginning with a performance of his original song "Rather Low" gathering considerable momentum on YouTube. Shoulders has been praised for his distinctive vocal style, which incorporates influences from early country music in the form of yodelling and whistling.

In addition to his music, Nick is also an accomplished illustrator having attended Rocky Mountain College of Art and Design in Denver, Colorado. His artwork has been notably featured on beer cans of the Fossil Cove Brewing Company in Fayetteville, AR. He has created additional mural installations in Fayetteville at The Smoke and Barrel Tavern and The Little Bread Company.

== Politics ==
Shoulders has been outspoken in questioning the culture of modern country music: In a 2020 article for In These Times, he criticized "fake twang" – the imitation of the Southern accent by musicians who are not from the American South, considering this practice symptomatic of the close association between mainstream country music, whiteness, and Conservatism in the United States. This association, he argued, failed to "acknowledge the diverse and complicated origin of these uniquely American musical forms", as well as the diversity of the rural United States as a whole, and he expressed the aspiration to help make country music "more accessible and more welcoming to people outside of the white rural experience".

Shoulders was one of the few country singers to call out the racism Beyoncé faced when her country album Cowboy Carter came out.

== Discography ==
- Lonely Like Me (2018)
- Okay, Crawdad (2019)
- Home on the Rage (2021)
- Heart of Night (EP) (2022)
- All Bad (2023)
- Refugia Blues (2025)
