= 2009 Kentuckiana flash flood =

U.S. natural disaster in 2009

Coordinates: 38.254°N 85.760°W

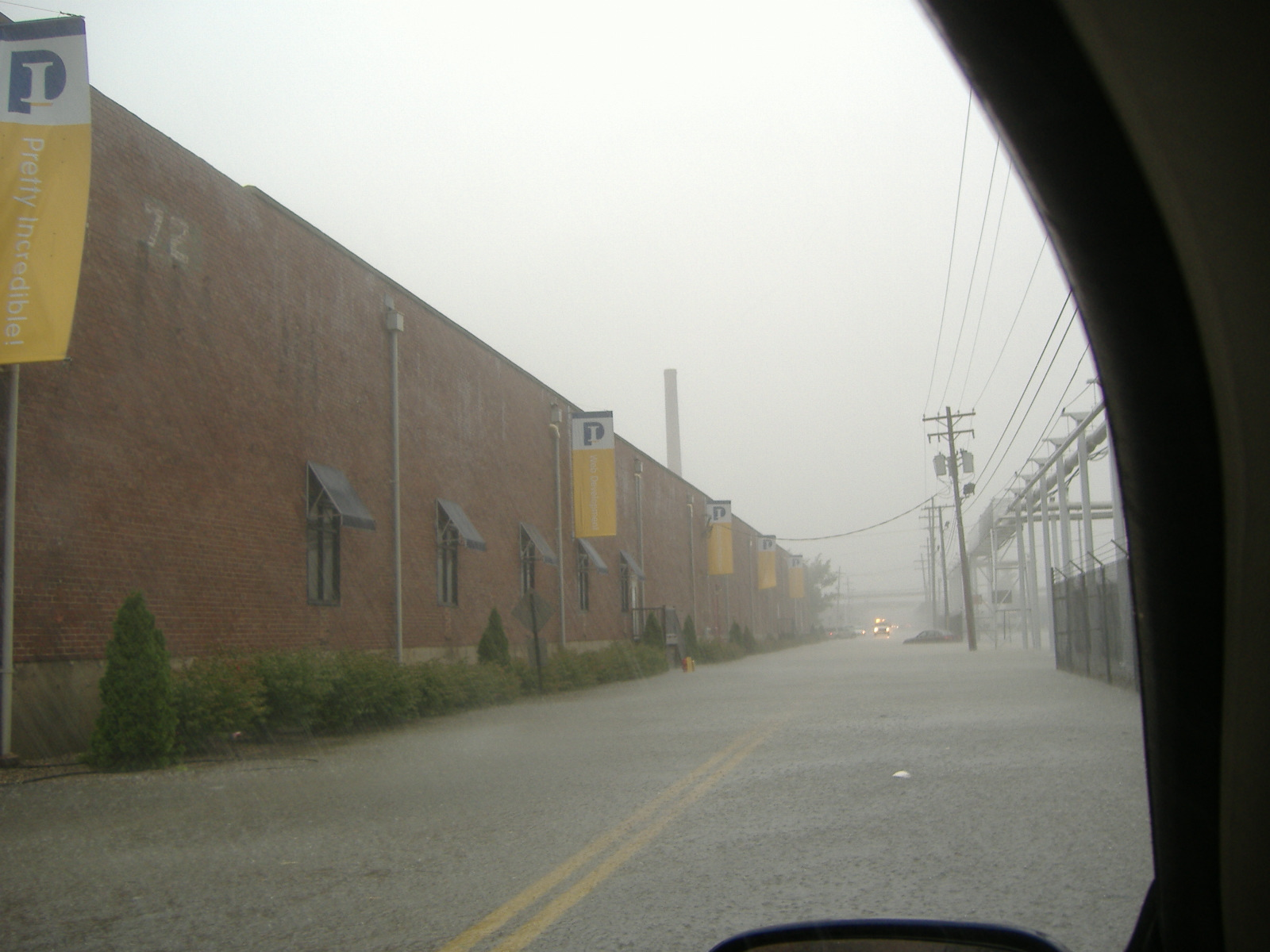
Flooding in Jeffersonville, Indiana during the 2009 Kentuckiana Flood

On August 4, 2009, a flash flood occurred and impacted Louisville and portions of the surrounding Kentuckiana region as a cold front and mesoscale convective system moved across the Midwestern United States. The National Weather Service estimated that between three and six inches (7.6 and 15.2 cm) of rain fell across the city in less than one hour, breaking all previous one-hour rainfall records in the area. Most of the downtown area was underwater, with the deluge reaching four feet (1.2 m) deep in places.

The University of Louisville and the Louisville Public Library's main branch each sustained millions of dollars in damage. On August 12, Governor of Kentucky Steve Beshear requested the federal government declare all of Jefferson County, Kentucky a major disaster area.

== Meteorological synopsis ==
A slow-moving cluster of thunderstorms descended from central Indiana into south-central Indiana and north-central Kentucky. As the storm moved into the Louisville Metropolitan Area, it continued to strengthen as a torrential downpour inundated the area. Downtown Louisville, New Albany, Jeffersonville, and Clarksville were particularly hard-hit with water depth surpassing four feet in some areas, resulting in the first-ever flash flood emergency being issued for those areas. Creeks and streams quickly flooded many neighborhoods, and flash floods rendered numerous streets and areas impassable. Severe lightning and wind that accompanied the storm led to more widespread damage. Rain continued throughout the day and ended in the afternoon hours of August 4.

== Impact ==
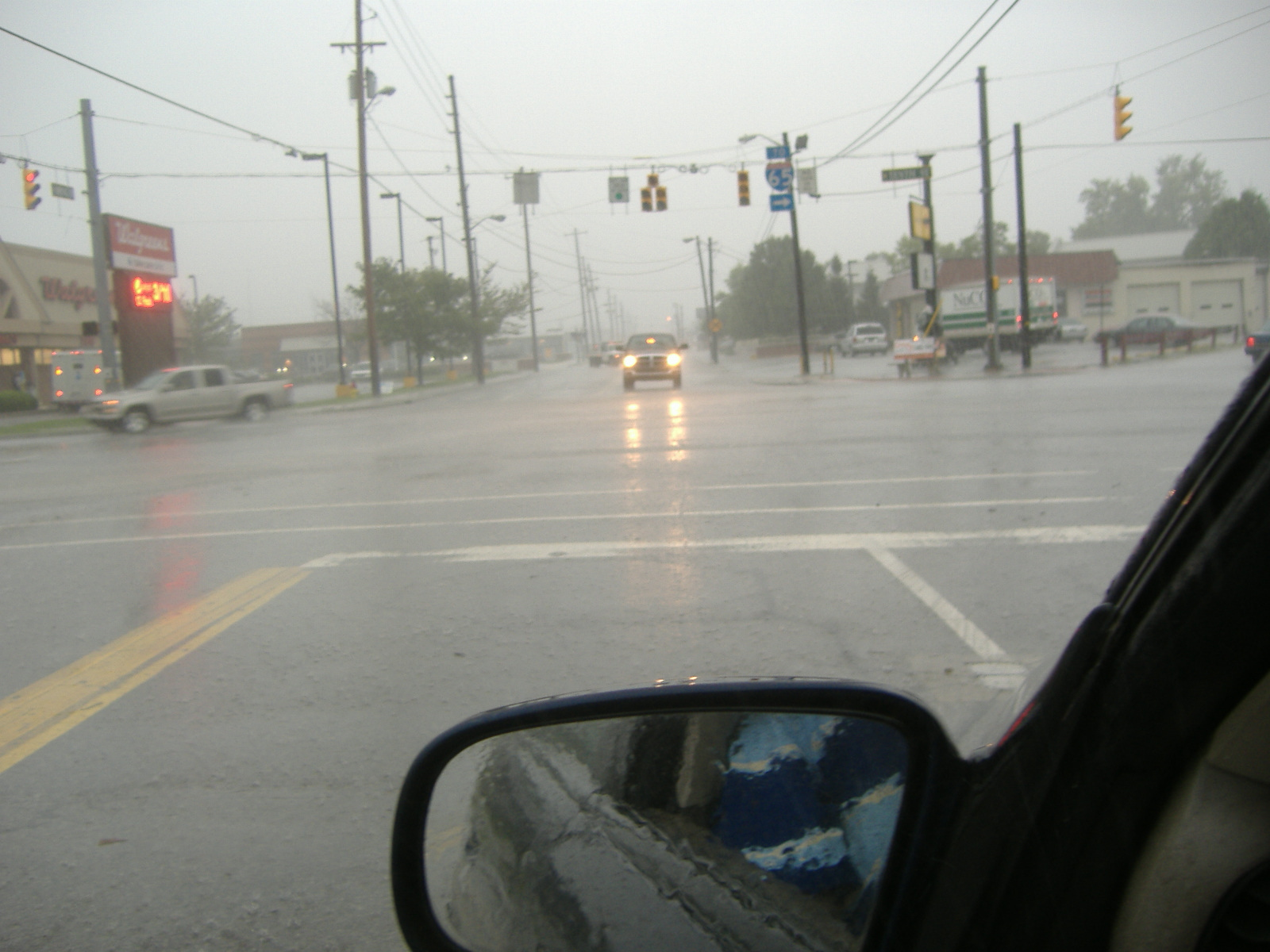
Heavy rainfall in Jeffersonville, Indiana causing power outages

In the morning hours of August 4, a severe thunderstorm watch was issued for far northern Kentucky, including Louisville, and central Indiana as a mesoscale convective system moved towards the Louisville area. The National Weather Service also issued a flash flood warning for the city and surrounding areas for several hours due to new and heavy bands of thunderstorms entering the area.

The Louisville International Airport was closed and flights were diverted to Lexington, Kentucky until 1 pm EDT. Northbound Northwest Airlines flight 2871, traveling from Knoxville to Minneapolis, passed through the storm over Louisville and experienced severe turbulence, injuring two passengers and forcing the plane to make an emergency landing at Lexington. Several city parking garages were completely underwater, submerging numerous vehicles. TARC, the city's public transportation system, was paralyzed with most buses abandoning their routes.

Debris, numerous automobile accidents, and abandoned vehicles caused I-71, I-64, I-65, and portions of I-264 and I-265 to shut down. Surrounding cities, including New Albany, Jeffersonville, and Sellersburg, Indiana were also affected. Additionally, most city streets were rendered impassable and several other important roadways were closed for hours. Across both Indiana and Kentucky, the massive amount of water entering the cities' underground viaducts caused a pressure build-up, blowing off a number of man-hole covers, which created dangerous road hazards.

The WDRB television news studio had water rise into the building during its newscast, prompting a makeshift water barrier to be erected during the broadcast. Lightning struck an apartment complex in the Hurstborne neighborhood, starting a fire that consumed most of the sixteen unit building. A second apartment in the west-end of Louisville was struck by lightning and destroyed by the fire caused by the strike.

The University of Louisville was among the worst hit, sustaining over $45 million in damages. The main branch of the Louisville Public Library was under three three feet (91 cm) of water, destroying tens of thousands of books and destroying dozens of computers which caused over $1 million in damage. The main branch sustained just over $5 million in damage and was closed for a month of repairs, outlying branches also sustained damage but to a lesser extent.

Numerous other buildings went underwater and had to be evacuated including the Cancer Society, Churchill Downs and horse barns were under three feet of water at various points. The trackside barns remained above the water level and 35 horses were moved there. Water rose so high on the south side of Louisville that most cars parked on the street were completely submerged. Three local animal shelters were flooded killing at least nine animals.

Most of downtown New Albany was under two to three feet (61 to 91 cm) of water. Water rescues occurred in the city.

== Response ==
Police and emergency responders began rescuing people trapped in cars and homes. No deaths or injuries were confirmed, and emergency responders from around the region were called in to assist in the relief efforts.

Over two hundred people were rescued from their cars during the course of the day, with about fifty people being rescued from their homes. Most people were able to escape rising waters to higher ground without emergency help. Assistance was also provided to the downtown area to help tens of thousands of people in leaving.

Kentucky Governor Steve Beshear requested Jefferson County be declared a major disaster area by the federal government on August 12, and also requested federal financial assistance. United States president Barack Obama approved federal assistance for flood victims.
