= Liz Cooper =

American rock band

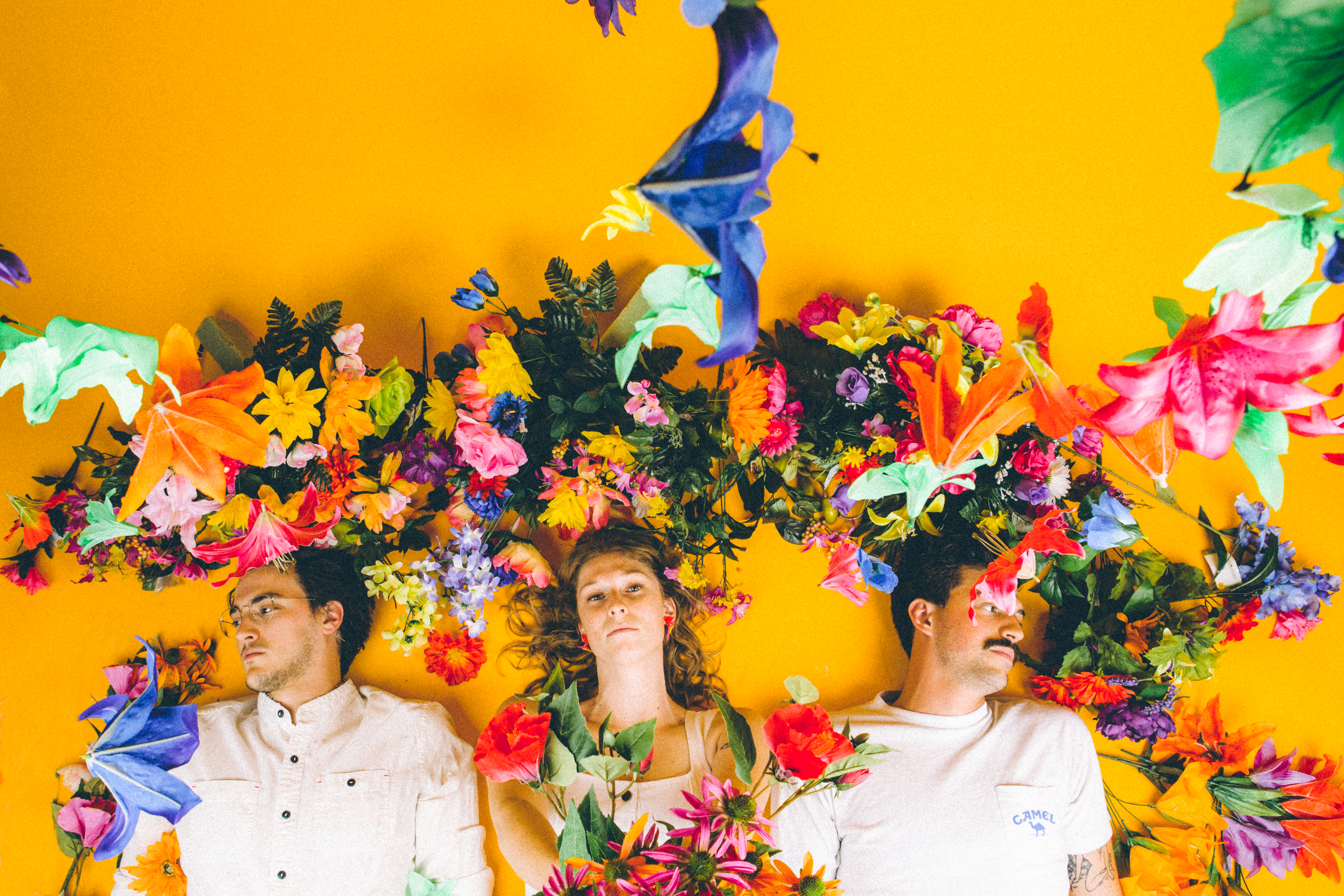
- Liz Cooper & The Stampede (courtesy of Kane Stewart)

Background information
- Origin: Brooklyn, New York, USA
- Genres: Rock; Psychedelia; Indie
- Years active: 2014-present
- Label: Sleepyhead Records
- Members: Liz Cooper
- Past members: Ky Baker; Grant Prettyman; Ryan Usher
- Website: Official website

Liz Cooper (born c. 1992) is an American singer-songwriter, guitarist, and visual artist. She first gained recognition as the front woman of the band Liz Cooper & The Stampede before launching her solo career in 2021. Her work incorporates elements of psychedelic and indie rock.

Cooper has released two studio albums and announced a third, New Day, scheduled for release in February 2026.

== Early life ==
Liz Cooper grew up in Baltimore, Maryland. She excelled as a high school golfer, earning a scholarship to Towson University. After one semester, she left school to pursue a musical career and relocated to Nashville in 2012 to focus on songwriting and performance.

== Career ==
=== Liz Cooper & The Stampede (2014–2019) ===
In Nashville, Cooper formed Liz Cooper & The Stampede with bassist Grant Prettyman and drummer Ky Baker, later replaced by Ryan Usher. The band’s self-released EP Monsters debuted in 2014, followed by Live at the Silent Planet in 2016 and two live Audiotree sessions in 2016 and 2017. The band toured widely, including performances at Austin City Limits, Newport Folk Festival, and BottleRock Napa Valley, and supporting acts including Lord Huron and Phosphorescent.

Their first studio album, Window Flowers, was released on August 10, 2018 through Sleepyhead Records in partnership with Thirty Tigers. Critics noted its blend of dreamy psychedelic textures, tight songwriting, and folk-rock arrangements.

=== Solo career and Hot Sass (2021) ===
After relocating to Brooklyn, New York, Cooper began releasing music under her own name. Her first solo album, Hot Sass, was released on September 3, 2021, via Thirty Tigers. The album was recorded primarily live in Burlington, Vermont, with producer Benny Yurco. Critics noted a stylistic shift toward garage rock and fuzz-driven textures.

In 2022, she released the EP Soft Sass, featuring reinterpretations of tracks from Hot Sass, as well as a cover of "Crazy Feeling" by Lou Reed. Reviews of her live performances emphasize her energetic stage presence and departure from Americana toward indie rock with garage-psych influences.

=== New Day (2026) ===
In October 2025, Cooper announced the release of her third studio album, New Day, in February 2026. The album's first single and title track, "New Day," was released the previous month. Cooper described the second single, "IDFK," as "a love song to a friend and myself," and the song received praise from critics for its "spellbinding" production, introspective lyrics, nostalgic vocal style, and "singular" sound.

Cooper stated that much of the record was written on the piano, in contrast to her earlier guitar-driven work, and explores her experiences coming out and navigating her first queer relationship and breakup.

== Musical style ==
Cooper’s early work blended folk-rock and psychedelic influences. Hot Sass introduced heavier guitar tones and garage rock elements, with critics describing the production as raw and the songwriting as experimental. Reviewers also noted her versatile vocal style. In a live review, she described the new sound as freeing her from genre constraints.

== Discography ==
=== Studio albums ===
- Window Flowers (2018) – with Liz Cooper & The Stampede
- Hot Sass (2021)
- New Day (announced for 2026)

=== Extended plays ===
- Monsters (2014) – with Liz Cooper & The Stampede
- Live at the Silent Planet (2016) – with Liz Cooper & The Stampede
- Live in Chicago (2019) – with Liz Cooper & The Stampede
- Soft Sass (2022)
