= Benjamin Tod =

American singer-songwriter

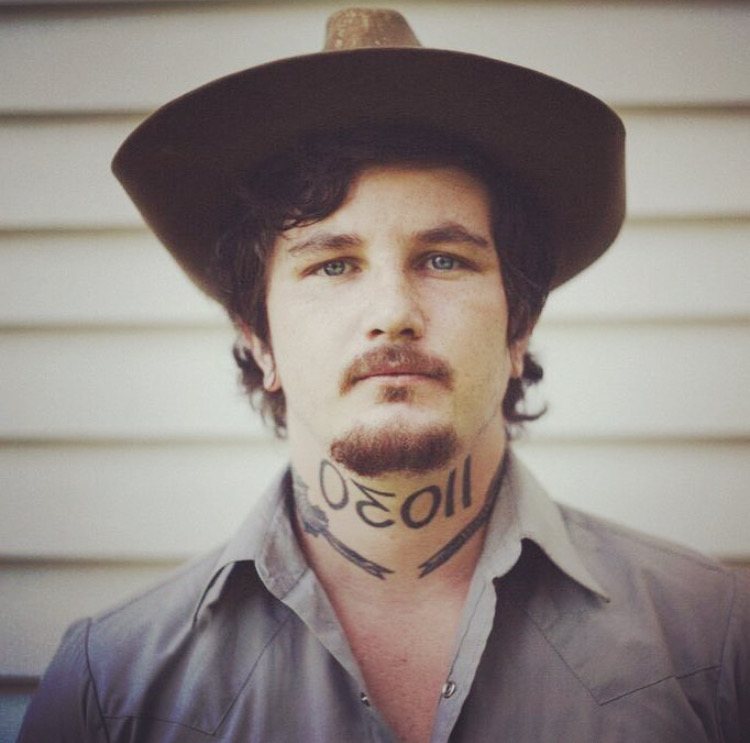

Background information
- Born: Benjamin Tod Flippo; November 11, 1990 (age 36)
- Genres: Country, folk
- Occupations: Musician, singer-songwriter
- Instruments: Guitar, banjo, harmonica, vocals
- Years active: 2008–present
- Label: Anti-Corp
- Website: www.benjamintodmusic.com

Benjamin Tod Flippo is an American singer-songwriter. He is lead singer and guitarist for the Lost Dog Street Band with his wife Ashley Mae (vocals, fiddle) and Jeff Loops (bass). The band has released several albums through crowdfunding platforms, with their album Weight of a Trigger reaching number five on the Billboard Bluegrass Albums chart in 2019.

== Biography ==
=== Early life ===
Tod grew up in Cottontown, Tennessee. He received his first guitar from his mother at the age of seven, but did not learn how to play until he was given a Fullerton Parlour guitar by a friend's father, at fourteen. The same year, he was expelled from school. Tod began hopping freight trains as a way to see the country.

=== Lost Dog Street Band ===
After being part of a music group called Barefoot Surrender, Tod and bandmate Ashley Mae formed the Lost Dog Street Band in 2010, named after their yellow Labrador, Daisy. Tod would do guitar and vocals while Mae would play the fiddle.

Tod and Mae met Nicholas and Shannon Jae Ridout. The two couples formed the street-quartet, Spitshine, and began touring together. In 2013 Nicholas Ridout committed suicide and Tod and Mae rekindled Lost Dog Street Band. The band has crowdfunded multiple albums through Indiegogo and Kickstarter, as well as self-publishing their music videos on the YouTube channel GemsOnVHS. Lost Dog Street Band toured and released their fifth studio album Weight of a Trigger in 2019, and in April of that year, the album reached number five on the Billboard Bluegrass Album chart.

=== Solo career ===
In 2017, Tod released the solo album I Will Rise which was recorded with "two mics and no overdubbing." In early 2019, Tod announced his second solo album, A Heart of Gold Is Hard to Find, which was released November 22, 2019. In June 2022, Tod announced his third solo album, Songs I Swore I'd Never Sing, which was released September 23, 2022.

== Personal life ==
Tod met his wife Ashley Mae when they were teenagers. While she was in college he hopped trains and busked to earn money. The couple has a homestead in Muhlenberg County, Kentucky.

== Discography ==
=== as Ben and Christian ===
- Human Divine: A Love Story (2007)

=== as Black Heart Rebellion ===
- I’ll Write To You In Better Days (2009)

=== as Never Say Surrender ===
- You Can’t Win (2011)

=== as Spit Shine ===
- S/T (2011)
- A Bottle & A Gun & A Troubled Mind (2013)

=== as Lost Dog Street Band ===
- Sick Pup(2011)
- Life's a Dog-gone Shame (2013)
- Homeward Bound (2015)
- Rage and Tragedy (2016)
- Weight of a Trigger (2019)
- The Magnolia Sessions (2021)
- Glory (2022)
- Survived (2024)
- Live From A Mile High (2025)

=== with Barefoot Surrender ===
- Barefoot Surrender (2013)

=== as The Teardrop Trio ===
- The Teardrop Trio (2014)

=== as Train Trestle Ramblers ===
- Lonesome and broken

=== Solo albums ===
- I Will Rise (2017)
- A Heart of Gold Is Hard to Find (2019)
- Songs I Swore I'd Never Sing (2022)
- Shooting Star (2024)
- Privilege Of A Man - Single (2024)
- Turn The Devil Away - Single(2024)
- Wyoming - Single (2024)
- Appalachia flood relief (w/ Matt Heckler, Jeff Loops) (2024)
- Goner - Single (2025)
- Kentucky Coal / Cry You A River (w/ Matt Heckler) - Single (2025)
- Outlaw Shit (w/ Shooter Jennings) - Single (2025)
- My Pride - Single (2025)
- Vengeance and Grace (2026)
