= Caamp =

American folk band

- Origin: Columbus, Ohio, U.S.
- Genre: Folk
- Label: Mom + Pop Music
- Members: Evan Westfall; Taylor Meier; Matt Vinson; Joseph Kavalec; Nicholas Falk
- Website: https://caamptheband.com/

Caamp (stylized as CAAMP) is an American folk band from Upper Arlington, a suburb of Columbus, Ohio.

== History ==
=== Formation and releases ===
The band began as a project between childhood friends Taylor Meier and Evan Westfall, who met at a summer camp while they were middle school students. Meier and Westfall graduated from Upper Arlington High School in 2012. In 2013, Taylor began playing in coffee shops around Athens while studying at the Ohio University. They later added bass player Matt Vinson, keyboardist Joseph Kavalec, and drummer Nicholas (Nick) Falk.

To date, Caamp has released four albums. Their first album, self-titled, was released in 2016 on Square Roots Records. In 2018, Caamp released a six-song EP. Their second album, By and By, was released in 2019 under Mom + Pop Music. "Peach Fuzz" is a single on the album.

In August 2019, Caamp made their debut on the Billboard Emerging Artists chart. By and By debuted at number one on the Heatseekers Albums chart.

The band's quarantine-era #PlayAtHome performance of the song "Wunderbar" was seen on The Late Show with Stephen Colbert on June 30, 2020.

On June 24, 2022, the band released their third studio album, Lavender Days. The release of the album was preceded by three singles: "Believe", "Apple Tree Blues", and "Lavender Girl". Their song Apple Tree Blues was featured on Barack Obama's summer playlist.

On February 18, 2022, Caamp collaborated with Paris Jackson on her The Lost EP, on the song "Lost".

Also in 2022, the band was nominated for 2023 Duo/Group of the Year by the Americana Music Association, performed the song "Believe!" on Jimmy Kimmel Live!, and performed on CBS Mornings' "Saturday Sessions".

On August 9, 2024, Caamp was featured on the remix of "Evergreen" by the folk rock band Richy Mitch & The Coal Miners.

In May 2025, their single "Let Things Go" hit No. 1 on the Americana Radio singles chart.

Another single, "And It's Gone," was featured as the main title theme song for Stick, which premiered on Apple TV+ in June 2025.

Their single, "All the Debts I Owe" was featured in episode 1 of Task (TV series).

=== Touring ===
Caamp performed at the 2019 Mo Pop Festival in Detroit. They also appeared at the 2019 Austin City Limits Music Festival.

In 2023, they were headliners at the Under the Big Sky festival in Whitefish, Montana.

Caamp has sold out large venues, including Nationwide Arena in their hometown of Columbus, OH, Red Rocks Amphitheatre, and (on their 2025 headlining tour) Radio City Music Hall (NYC), The Salt Shed (Chicago), the Anthem (Washington, D.C.), the Ascend Amphitheater (Nashville), and MGM Music Hall (Boston). The 2025 tour also includes dates in the UK and Ireland.

Caamp has been announced to appear at the Oceans Calling festival in Ocean City, Maryland in September 2026.

== Discography ==
=== Albums ===
Title	Year	Peak positions	
Title	Year	US	US Heat.
Caamp	2016	—	—
Boys	2018	—	—
By & By	2019	—	1
Live from Newport Music Hall	2020	—	—
Lavender Days	2022	83	—
Copper Changes Color	2025	176	—

=== Singles ===
Title	Year	Peak chart positions	Certifications	Album
Title	Year	US AAA	Certifications	Album
"Penny, Heads Up"	2019	—		By & By
"No Sleep"	2019	—		By & By
"Wolf Song"	2019	—		By & By
"Peach Fuzz"	2019	1		By & By
"By and By"	2019	12	RIAA: Gold	By & By
"Officer of Love"	2020	1		Non-album singles
"Square One"	2021	—		Non-album singles
"Believe"	2022	1		Lavender Days
"Apple Tree Blues"	2022	—		Lavender Days
"Lavender Girl"	2022	—		Lavender Days
"The Otter"	2022	3		Lavender Days
"Let Things Go"	2025	1		Somewhere EP
"Mistakes"	2025	1		Copper Changes Color

=== Other certified singles ===
Title	Year	Certifications	Album
"Vagabond"	2016	RIAA: Gold; RMNZ: Gold	Caamp
