= Bendigo Fletcher =

American indie folk rock band

- Origin: Louisville, Kentucky
- Genres: indie folk
- Years active: 2016–present
- Label: Elektra Records
- Members: Ryan Anderson; Andrew Shupert; Evan Wagner; Conner Powell; Chris Weis

Bendigo Fletcher is an American indie folk band from Louisville, Kentucky, formed in 2016, and led by songwriter Ryan Anderson.

== History ==
Formed in April 2016, Bendigo Fletcher soon attracted attention in Louisville and the surrounding region. In 2017, the band was nominated for Americana Artist of the Year at the Louisville Music Awards.

In 2018, Bendigo Fletcher released their first EP titled Consensual Wisdom. In 2019, Bendigo Fletcher released their second EP titled Terminally Wild. Bendigo Fletcher's third EP, Memory Fever, was released in 2019.

In May 2021, Bendigo Fletcher announced plans to release their debut full-length album. The album, Fits of Laughter, was released on August 13, 2021, via Elektra Records.

In 2024, Bendigo Fletcher released their second full-length album titled Two Things At Once, also on Elektra Records.

== Band members ==
- Ryan Anderson – lead vocals, guitar, banjo
- Andrew Shupert — backing vocals, lead guitar
- Evan Wagner — backing vocals, keyboards, guitar, percussion
- Conner Powell — bass
- Chris Weis — drums

== Discography ==
=== Studio albums ===
Title	Details
Fits of Laughter	Released: 2021; Label: Elektra Records
Two Things At Once	Released: 2024; Label: Elektra Records

=== Extended plays ===
Title	Details
Consensual Wisdom	Released: 2018; Label: Soul Step Records
Terminally Wild	Released: 2019; Label: Soul Step Records
Memory Fever	Released: 2019; Label: Soul Step Records
Wingding	Released: 2022; Label: Elektra Records
