= Evergreen (Richy Mitch & the Coal Miners song) =

2017 song by Richy Mitch & the Coal Miners

- Cover art for the remix featuring Caamp

Single by Richy Mitch & the Coal Miners

from the album RMCM
- Released: May 17, 2017
- Genre: Folk rock
- Length: 1:27
- Label: Band of Wolves
- Songwriters: Mitchell Cutts; Nicolas Haughn
- Producer: Haughn

Richy Mitch & the Coal Miners singles chronology
"Evergreen" (2017)	"Sierra Vista" (2024)

"Evergreen" is a song by American folk rock band Richy Mitch & the Coal Miners, originally released on May 17, 2017, from their debut studio album RMCM. It was a sleeper hit and gained widespread recognition in 2024 due to use on the video-sharing platform TikTok.

== Background ==
In January 2024, the song debuted at No. 15 on Hot Rock Songs and No. 20 on Hot Rock & Alternative Songs. TikTok has been crucial to the song's success; by August 2024, the song has soundtracked over 300,000 clips to date. It became the first song by Richy Mitch & the Coal Miners to enter the Billboard Hot 100, debuting at number 83. An official remix of the song featuring American folk band Caamp was released on August 9, 2024. The remix has further boosted popularity of the song.

== Charts ==
=== Weekly charts ===
Weekly chart performance for "Evergreen"
Chart (2017–2025)	Peak position
Austria (Ö3 Austria Top 40)	47
Canada Hot 100 (Billboard)	57
Global 200 (Billboard)	84
Netherlands (Single Top 100)	61
Norway (VG-lista)	38
Sweden (Sverigetopplistan)	73
Switzerland (Schweizer Hitparade)	44
UK Singles (Official Charts)	36
US Billboard Hot 100	83
US Hot Rock & Alternative Songs (Billboard)	9

=== Year-end charts ===
Year-end chart performance for "Evergreen"
Chart (2024)	Position
Global 200 (Billboard)	166
Netherlands (Single Top 100)	87
Sweden (Sverigetopplistan)	97
Switzerland (Schweizer Hitparade)	69
UK Singles (OCC)	88
US Hot Rock & Alternative Songs (Billboard)	27

== Certifications ==
Certifications for "Evergreen"
Region	Certification	Certified units/sales
Denmark (IFPI Danmark)	Gold	45,000^{‡}
Italy (FIMI)	Gold	50,000^{‡}
New Zealand (RMNZ)	2× Platinum	60,000^{‡}
Spain (Promusicae)	Gold	30,000^{‡}
United Kingdom (BPI)	Platinum	600,000^{‡}
United States (RIAA)	2× Platinum	2,000,000^{‡}
Streaming
Greece (IFPI Greece)	Gold	1,000,000^{†}
^{‡} Sales+streaming figures based on certification alone.^{†} Streaming-only figures based on certification alone.
