= Folk Music Club (North Texas) =

Former University of North Texas student organization

The Folk Music Club was an organization founded in 1963 at the University of North Texas that attracted student musicians, several of whom went on with other performing artist to define a Texas music and cultural movement in Austin that grew to national prominence and left a legacy that endures today (re: Sixth Street, South by Southwest, Austin City Limits, Austin City Limits Music Festival). Its student members included Spencer Perskin, Steven Fromholz, Ray Wylie Hubbard, Michael Martin Murphey, and Eddie Wilson (co-founder of Armadillo World Headquarters and current owner of Threadgill's in Austin).

== History ==
Faculty sponsors

The Folk Music Club was founded and sponsored by Stan Alexander (né Stanley Gerald Alexander; 1928–2017), a professor of English literature at North Texas who drew inspiration from having earlier played jam sessions (as singer and guitar player) at Threadgill's in Austin (of Janis Joplin fame) while working on his doctorate at The University of Texas. Alexander sometimes referred to the Folk Music Club as "Threadgill's North." A poster promoting Michael Murphey's Cosmic Cowboy Symphony & BBQ, performing at the Armadillo World Headquarters, characterized Alexander as "The Original Cosmic Cowboy." Alexander went on to be a long-time English professor at Stephen F. Austin State University. Julian O. Long (né Julian Oliver Long, Jr.; born 1937), of St. Louis, Missouri (as of 2002), was also a faculty sponsor of the Folk Music Club from 1963 to 1965. Long was on the North Texas English faculty off and on from 1962 to 2002.

Student members

Fromholz, who had enrolled at North Texas in 1963, became president of the Folk Music Club. Other members included Segle Fry (Segle George Fry III; 1937–2015) and Don F. Brooks (1947–2000), harmonica player. Fromholz's first public performance was with Patty Loman and Michael Murphey. Their trio — named the "Michael Murphey Trio" — performed in an area around Denton they referred to as "The Green Bean Circuit."

== Past presidents and members ==
Past officers

- Steven Fromholz (1945–2014) (president)
- John Brack Barrett (born 1944) (president)

== See also ==
- Progressive country
