= Joseph Massey =

Joseph Massey may refer to:

- Joe Massei (1899–1971), or Joe Massey, American gangster of Italian-Irish origins
- Joseph Massey sen. (1827–1900), Australian musician with a family of organists
- Joseph Massey (cricketer) (1895–1977), English cricketer
- Joseph Massey (poet), see New Sincerity

== See also ==
- Joseph Massie (disambiguation)
