= Guy Juke =

American songwriter

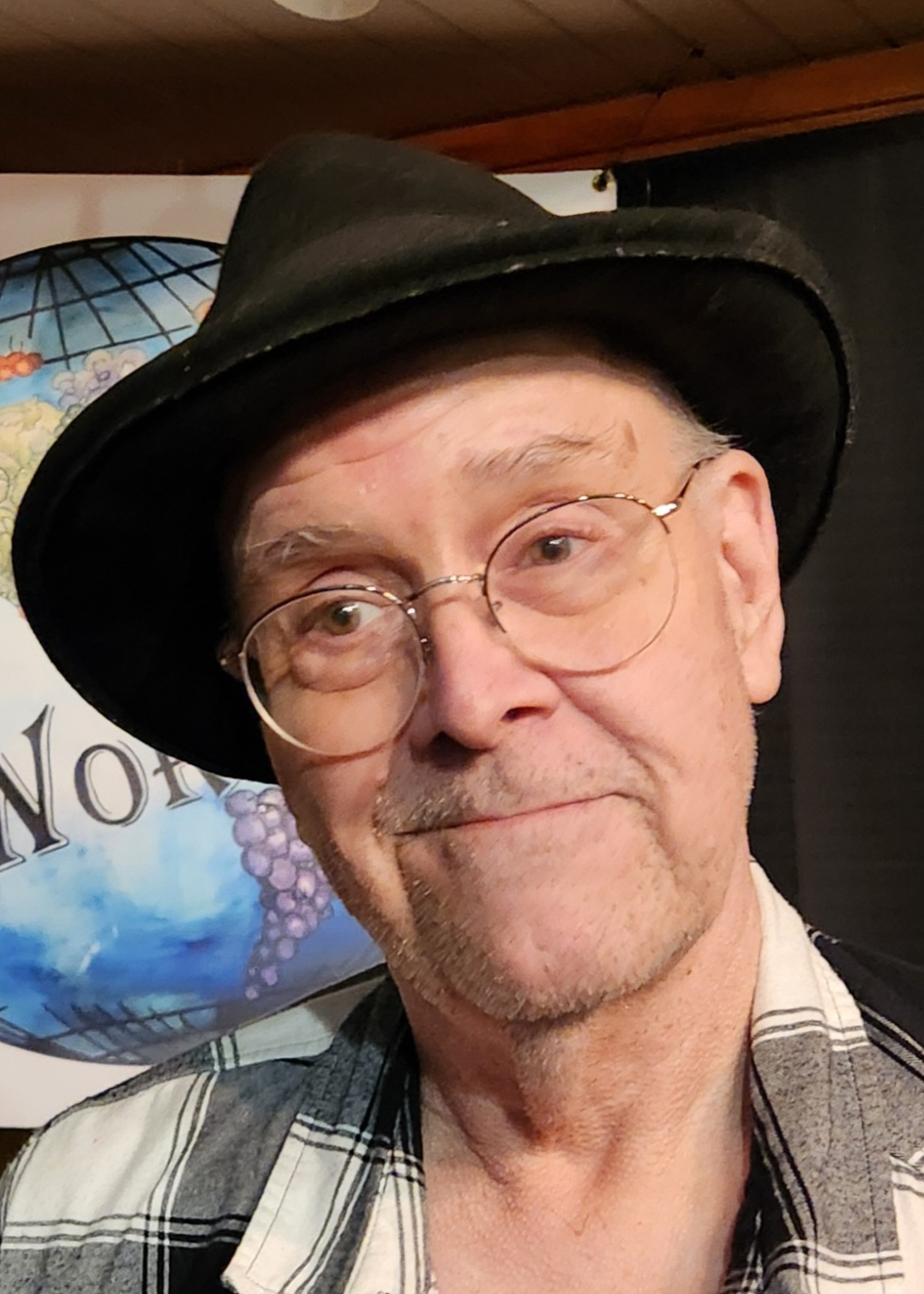
- Appearing with the Melancholy Ramblers at NeWorlDeli, Austin
- Born: William De White; 1951 (age 74–75); San Angelo, Texas, U.S.
- Other name: Blackie White

Comedy career
- Years active: 1972−present
- Medium: Graphic artist

William De White (born September 4, 1951), better known as Guy Juke, is an Austin, Texas–based graphic artist and musician. As a poster artist he created memorable imagery for nightclubs such as Armadillo World Headquarters and was one of the 'Armadillo Art Squad'. His work is recognized for its blocky, sharp-edged figures on angular, geometric settings. Often darkly detailed, his work include shadowy and angular figures inspired by horror films, haunting western landscapes, and loopy cartoon characters.

== Personal life ==
Guy Juke was born in San Angelo, Texas on September 4, 1951. Early on his father recognized his son's natural artistic talent and encouraged him by providing him with private art lessons. Juke gave up his formal art training to join a commune in his hometown. After moving to Austin in late 1972 he became Guy Juke.

Juke (De White) married Doris Eleanor Bickley (from Corpus Christi) January 1985. Bickley, also an Austin artist, worked mainly in paint and canvas. The two rented loft studios on the top floor of Half Price Books retail store (a former laundry at 16th and Lavaca Austin TX) where the entire building was populated with artists, artisans, dancers and musicians. Bickley worked at one end of the labyrinthal building and Juke at the other end with Sheauxnough Studios and poster artists, Micael Priest, Danny Garret, Bill Narum, Jim Franklin and others on the 16th Street side. He and Bickley divorced in the 90s.

Juke later married Austin musician Jo Carol Pierce. They began their relationship in 1990 while working on a show called “The Wedding at the End of the World”. He was contributing art and she was writing monologues for the show.

== Graphic artist ==
Arriving in Austin Juke began his career writing and illustrating underground comics. Immersing himself in the Austin music scene, particularly the Armadillo World Headquarters, Juke became acquainted with local music poster artists. Soon he began creating concert posters himself. He developed a recognizable style using blocky, sharp-edged figures on angular, geometric settings. His work is also recognized for its darkly detailed, sometimes shadowy figures inspired by horror films, haunting western landscapes, and loopy cartoon characters.

Poster historian Nels Jacobson wrote about Juke, "More than any other Austin poster artist, his work exhibits a strikingly broad cross-section of styles - from realistic portraits to Merrie Melodies takeoffs, from old-style ersatz woodcuts to New Wave minimalism."

His talent earned him recognition as one of the artists collectively known as the 'Armadillo Art Squad', a group centered around the Armadillo World Headquarters music scene. The group includes Micael Priest and Jim Franklin, Kerry Awn, Danny Garrett, Bill Narum, and Sam Yeates.

He created concert posters using his unique graphic design for many performers including Joe Ely, B-52s, Willie Nelson, Frank Zappa, Talking Heads, Pavarotti, Asleep at the Wheel, and Roy Buchanan.

Juke's posters from the AWHQ era have become sought after collector's items, as are the silkscreened posters he created for The Austin Chronicle Music Awards and Austin's Carnaval.

Juke's cubist bepop styled work is featured as the album cover for Joe Ely's 1980 Live Shots album. He is also credited with the cover art of The Ramones 1981 album Pleasant Dreams. Juke provided cover art for The Austin Chronicle from their beginning. In 2002, the Chronicle chose his Escher-esque self-meditation work for their 21st anniversary's cover.

Video game maker Richard Garriott sought out Armadillo artists and Juke was one of those who responded, helping infuse funky alternative Austin into Garriott's high tech games.

When author and musician Kinky Friedman campaigned for Texas Governor in 2006, Juke designed the campaign logos and posters.

== Musician ==
In addition to his graphic art, Juke has performed as a guitarist with Butch Hancock, Ponty Bone, Doak Snead and as Blackie White in the Cornell Hurd Band.

== Exhibitions ==
The South Austin Popular Culture Center hosted a solo exhibition of Juke's art in 2005, May 21 - June 11. The exhibit drew heavily from the Armadillo World Headquarters era, when Juke's artistic career became popular. The retrospective included posters for shows by Frank Zappa, Talking Heads, Rickie Lee Jones, as well as Texans Asleep at the Wheel and Townes Van Zandt.

In 2016 Juke's work was included in the "Homegrown: Austin Music Posters 1967 to 1982" exhibit, mounted by the Wittliff Collections at Texas State University in San Marcos. The exhibit's posters provide a visual definition of Austin as it morphed from a late ’60s quiet college town into a counterculture center.

== Partial bibliography ==
- Visual Thrills Vol. 1: 44 Posters and paintings by Austin artist Guy Juke (Void of Course Publishing Co., Inc.1980)
