= Raul's (night club) =

Austin, Texas music venue

Coordinates: 30°17′27″N 97°44′30″W

Raul's was a live music nightclub at 2610 Guadalupe Street in Austin, Texas in the late 1970s and early 1980s, which started off as a Chicano music venue, but then specialized in punk rock music. The location is near the University of Texas campus.

It was the first club of its kind in the city and, for a time, the only venue for punk/new wave bands. The more successful bands from that scene were the ones who broadened their fan base by also playing at other Austin venues, such as the Continental Club, Soap Creek and the Armadillo World Headquarters.

== History ==
Originally a bar run by Hispanics Joseph Gonzales (died in May 1996) and Roy "Raul" Gomez, when, in late 1977, four musicians, Jesse Sublett, Kathy Valentine, Carla Olson and Marilyn Dean, approached them, looking for a venue to play at, since these performers had had difficulties being accepted elsewhere. The four musicians had formed a new punk band called the Violators. Sublett, along with Eddie Munoz and Bill Blackmon comprised the other new punk band in town, the Skunks. Raul's gave both bands a chance, but at first were skeptical about the new style, which was quite different from their original conception of operating a bar that catered to Tejano music. The Violators and the Skunks first played at Raul's in February 1978 to a mildly enthusiastic audience. Thereafter, the Skunks, with mainstay Jesse Sublett, and a new guitarist, Jon Dee Graham, garnered a large and devoted following, not only at Raul's but other, more mainstream venues around Austin.

Raul's was not only the first venue in Austin to feature punk/new wave bands on a regular basis, but it became the nerve center for the punk/new wave scene. From this beginning, with the first gig by the Skunks and Violators, the Austin music scene itself began to shift. No longer would Austin be known merely as the home of Willie Nelson and Jerry Jeff Walker,

Then there was the September 19 incident of the arrest for obscenity of the singer of The Huns, Phil Tolstead, while on stage for their first performance, which drew considerable attention after a scoop article on the matter was published in the university students' newspaper, The Daily Texan, and on to other publications such as Rolling Stone and the NME in the UK. A photograph had been taken at the moment where a bare-chested Tolstead, being handcuffed on stage, was reaching to one of the police officers for a kiss on the cheek. The establishment experienced a noticeable increase in clientele, fueled by curiosity, especially among young people, thanks to its proximity to the university.

== The bands ==
A recording was made there, the 1979 Live at Raul's, a compilation of songs by five of the most popular of the Raul's bands: The Skunks, Standing Waves, The Explosives, The Next, and Terminal Mind. Two songs by Roky Erickson were added when the release occurred on CD. Other regular performers included: Reversible Cords, Radio Free Europe, Eddie and the Inm'8s, Joe "King" Carrasco and the Crowns, Sharon Tate's Baby, The MiƧtakes, Boy Problems, the Chickadiesels, the Re*cords, the Reactors, the Delinquents, D-Day (fronted by De Lewellen), Aces88, the Inserts, the all-female band The Foams, the Jitters, Action Toys, the Norvells, the Electric Tools, the Stains, the Gators, the Derelicts, the Huns, Radio Planets, the Rejects, Secret Science, Perverted Popes, ROKKER, the Invisibles, Toxic Shock; then later, the Big Boys, and The Dicks.

The club hosted a number of touring bands such as The Plugz from LA, who had Texas roots, in the summer of 79, and The Dils, also from California. The Urinals, from Los Angeles, happened by. Also: The Psychedelic Furs on their first US tour (1980), the wild female rhythm of The Dinettes on their first cross-country tour from San Diego, California, on June 25 & 26, the Controllers from L.A. (November 17 & 18). Patti Smith made an appearance specifically so she could play a song with The Skunks. Devo also visited the club and so did Elvis Costello, who came to the club with members of the Attractions and Rockpile in tow, and as the Skunks were half-way through their first set, Costello joined the band for one song, then ended up playing for the rest of their set. Just a few of the other visitors included Robert Fripp, Annie Lennox, and all the members of Blondie—drummer Clem Burke and guitarist Frank Infante joined the Skunks for several songs. Black Flag also played on their first tour.

A fanzine was circulating, named Sluggo!.

The club had no PA system and few of the bands owned their own PA. On some nights, bands hired the Austin-based company, Black Diamond, owned by Bruce Reilly and James (Jim) Berry; on many others, they rented equipment from Crosswind, owned by John Nelson.

== Reunions ==
There have been several "Raul's reunions" around town: one in 1988; one on October 29, 1994 at Liberty Lunch; one on September 26, 2003 to commemorate the 25th anniversary of the "Huns riot", at Café Mundi; a "Class of '78" performance at the Austin Music Hall for the Austin Music Awards on March 17, 2004; one at Trophy's on November 6, 2004; and one at the Texas Showdown, the now defunct bar at Raul's former location, on January 26, 2008.
