= Austin Museum of Popular Culture =

American nonprofit organization

Coordinates: 30°15′6″N 97°45′54″W

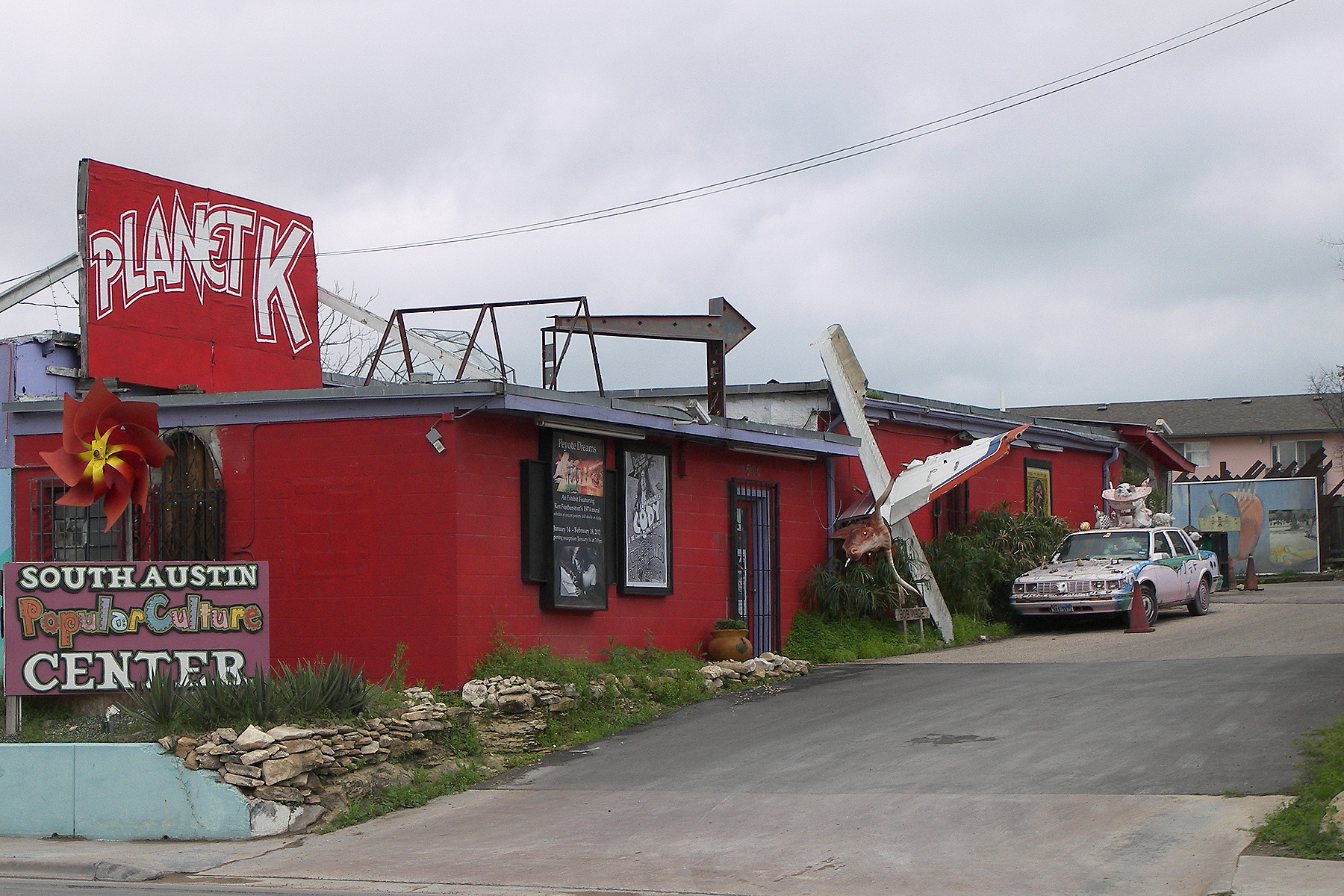
The Austin Museum of Popular Culture at its former location

The Austin Museum of Popular Culture (AusPop) is an Austin, Texas nonprofit organisation dedicated to collecting, preserving, and exhibiting art and memorabilia that reflects Austin's eclectic contributions to popular culture worldwide.

== History and mission ==
AusPop (originally South Austin Museum of Popular Culture) was formally established in 2005 to collect and display concert posters by a group of artists known as the Armadillo Art Squad who came together around the Armadillo World Headquarters.

It was born from a community art collective known as the South Austin Museum of Popular Culture which had coalesced in 2004 around the private files of Henry Gonzalez.

The collections expanded to include other live music venues of the 1970s including Threadgills, the Vulcan Gas Company, the Austin Opry House, and Antone's.

Eventually the purpose of AusPop was to preserve the legacy of Austin's counterculture and popular arts through exhibitions, collection, and scholarship. The center has evolved to become a collecting and exhibiting center for photography, prints, and non-traditional art and has widened the visibility of the Austin cultural scene.

The Austin Museum of Popular Culture is an independent resource available to those who want to learn more about the city's cultural history and is not supported by any governmental organizations.

== Armadillo Art Squad ==
An extensive 1997 review of the Armadillo Art Squad named many of its artists and cartoonists (often one and the same), including Gilbert Shelton, Jim Franklin, Guy Juke, Kerry Awn, Michael E. Arth, Ken Featherston, Henry Gonzales, Danny Garrett, Sam Yeates, Micael Priest, Gary McIlhenny, and Jack Jaxon. This group of local Austin artists designed posters and handbills for Eddie Wilson's Armadillo World Headquarters at a time when the Austin music scene was fueled by the Cosmic Cowboy movement.

== Memorial Wall ==
AusPop's outdoor memorial, "Wall of Fame", as Austin humorist John Kelso calls it, has photos of over 150 people. It honors their contribution to Austin's creative scene. The outdoor wall includes both the famous and the obscure, from Bill Hicks, Stevie Ray Vaughan and Janis Joplin to Bill Livingood, Bud Shrake, and Poodie Locke, Willie Nelson's stage manager.

== Name changes ==
The museum was originally named the South Austin Museum of Popular Culture.

In 2010 it was renamed the South Austin Popular Culture Center and became locally known as SouthPop. Subsequently, the name changed back to South Austin Museum of Popular Culture.

In September 2019 executive director Leea Mechling announced that the museum would be renamed the Austin Museum of Popular Culture and would relocate to a new space on North Lamar behind Threadgill's restaurant.

== Recognition ==
The museum is the subject of many articles in the Austin Chronicle, who in 2004 distinguished the museum as the "Best Place to Art Trip." The New York Times included SAMOPC in a Frugal Traveler video.

== See also ==
- List of music museums
- Keep Austin Weird
