= Hub City Movers =

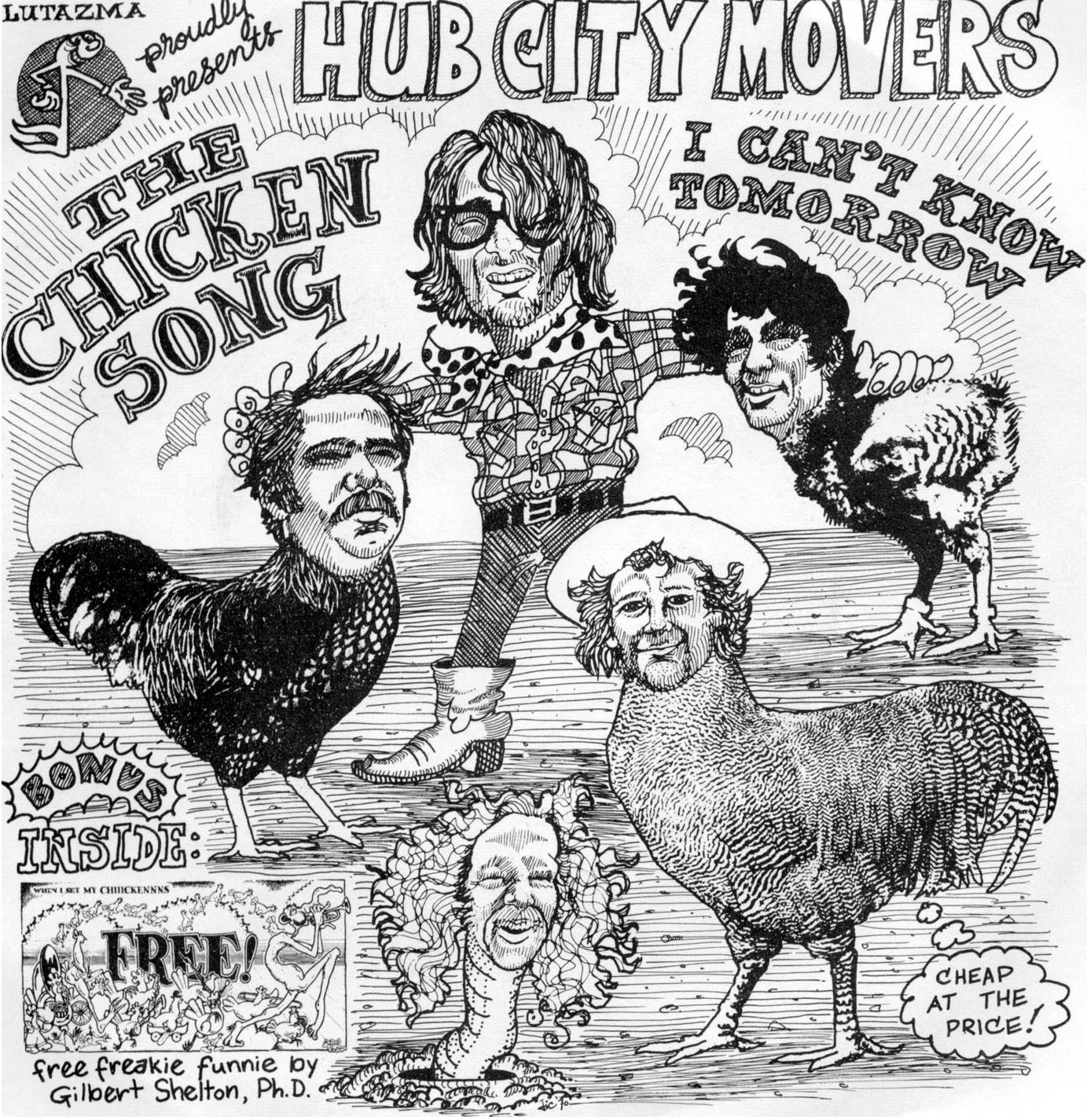
Sleeve for Chicken Song 45RPM single, by Jic Clubb

The Hub City Movers was an eclectic American band, formed in Austin, Texas in September 1969. The original members were Jerry Barnett, Stuart Ervin, Jimmie Dale Gilmore, Stan Poytres, Charlie Sauer, and Ed Vizard. Ervin left late in 1969. Poytres was replaced by Ike Ritter in January 1970. John X Reed joined that spring. The band was prominent in the last stages of the Vulcan Gas Company (1967–1970).

== The Chicken Song ==
Soon after the founding, the band began setting "Set My Chickens Free" by Gilbert Shelton to music. The adaptation begins as a talking blues by Barnett, followed by vocal chorus by the band, clucking sounds and noisemakers in the style of Spike Jones. The B-side of the 45 rpm release is the Al Strehli composition, "I Can't Know Tomorrow", Gilmore's first commercial recording. David Carradine released a version of The Chicken Song in 1975. In 1983, a Danish comic "Slip Hønsene Løs" included a flexible disc release of the Hub City Movers recording as "Set Your Chickens Free". Merle Haggard recorded "Set My Chickens Free", on his studio album 1994.

== Armadillo World Headquarters ==
June 13, 1970, soon after the closing of the Vulcan Gas Company, the Hub City Movers were playing the Cactus Club, 415 Barton Springs Rd. Eddie Wilson, Gilmore and Reed were outside during a break, when Eddie first laid eyes on an abandoned Army Reserve Armory next door that was about the same size as The Fillmore. The Armadillo World Headquarters had its grand opening, with Hub City Movers opening for Shiva's Headband, less than two months later.

The Hub City Movers disbanded in October 1970.
