= Nels =

Nels is a given name. Notable people with the given name include:

- Nels Ackerson (1944–2025), American lawyer
- Nels N. Alling (1861–1955), Danish-American sculptor
- Nels Andersen (1891–1961), American politician
- Nels Anderson (1889–1986), American sociologist
- Nels Anderson (politician) (1828–1887), American politician
- Nels Andrews, American folk singer
- Nels Bruseth (1886–1957), American mountaineer, naturalist, author, and painter
- Nels Christianson, American politician
- Nels Cline (born 1956), American guitarist and composer
- Nels Crutchfield (1911–1985), Canadian ice hockey player
- Nels F. S. Ferré (1908–1971), Swedish-born American theologian
- Nels Hagerup (1864–1922), Norwegian-born American painter
- Nels Holman (1861–1946), American newspaper editor, businessman, and politician
- Nels Jacobson (born 1949), American artist and poster art historian
- Nels Johnson (1838–1915), Danish-born American clockmaker
- Nels Johnson (judge) (1896–1958), American judge
- Nels Larson (1869–1937), American politician and businessman
- Nels Nelsen (1894–1943), Norwegian–Canadian ski jumper
- Nels C. Nelson (1875–1964), Danish-American archaeologist
- Nels H. Nelson (1903–1973), United States Marine Corps general
- Nels Nelson (politician) (1917–1992), Canadian politician
- Nels David Nelson (1918–2003), American mathematician and logician
- Nels S.D. Peterson (born 1978), American lawyer and jurist
- Nels Pierson (born 1972), American politician
- Nels Podolsky (1923–2007), Canadian ice hockey player
- Nels Potter (1911–1990), American baseball player
- Nels Roney (1853–1944), American building contractor and carpenter
- Nels Running (born 1941), retired United States Air Force Major General
- Nels H. Smith (1884–1976), American politician
- Nels J. Smith (born 1939), American politician
- Nels Stewart (1902–1957), Canadian ice hockey player
- Nels Swandal, American politician
- Nels Wold (1895–1918), United States Army soldier
- Nels Andrew Rude (born 1988), prominent Wisconsin lobbyist

== See also ==
- Louis Nels (1855–1910), German government official
- Nel (name)
