= Micael Priest =

American artist (1951–2018)

- Born: October 21, 1951; Birmingham, Alabama, U.S.
- Died: September 12, 2018 (aged 66); Austin, U.S.
- Notable work: Armadillo World Headquarters poster art

Micael Priest (October 21, 1951 – September 12, 2018) was an American artist and raconteur. Due to Priest's color-blindness, his primary medium was pen and ink, which he put to use in rock posters. Often printed in single color or split-fountain reliefs, the posters were done mostly for Armadillo World Headquarters, a music hall in Austin, Texas that operated from August 7, 1970, to December 31, 1980.

== Biography ==
Priest had a prodigious and humorous cartoon style inspired by Walt Disney. In the seventh grade he was awarded a scholarship to the California Institute of the Arts, founded by Walt Disney in Santa Clarita, California in 1961, but his family moved from California to Texas before he could start school. Undeterred, he adopted his personal interpretation of the style anyway, stating it "was actually a brush style where you used the varying thickness of line to imply weight, depth, or shadow." His 1972 poster for the Armadillo World Headquarters for a Willie Nelson and Greezy Wheels set him on a path that eventually totaled more than 100 posters for the Armadillo alone.

Priest moved to Austin in 1969, where he got his start at the Vulcan Gas Company, a rock music venue in Austin. He worked with artist Jim Franklin and took over as art director after cartoonist Gilbert Shelton moved to San Francisco to become a key member of the underground comix movement. Beginning in 1972, Priest ran a counter-culture art studio called Directions Company and commissioned artists for various clients, beginning with Eddie Wilson of The Armadillo World Headquarters. "The Armadillo Art Squad," with Priest as its most prominent member, included artists Michael E. Arth, Kerry Awn, Guy Juke, Ken Featherston, Jim Franklin, Danny Garrett, Henry Gonzales, Bill Narum, Dale Wilkins, and Sam Yeates. Directions Company closed down in 1974. In 1976, priest, John Rodgers and Sam Yeates founded an arts collective called Sheauxnough Studios.

== Obituaries ==
An obituary in The Austin Chronicle described Priest:

Besides art, Micael was a master of the story. He was never short of them. The city and the state it capitalized; citizens of all stripes and denizens of cafes, bars and clubs; the countryside and its critters; the music and the musicians – especially these – were all grist for his mill. Stories constituted the air he breathed, with the exhale always more than the inhale. Always. He was a counter-cultural sage, and frequently dressed the part. So much so, in fact, that in his later years, he cut the striking figure of a hippie Gandalf, parting the air with a yarn, and the pavement with his serpentine walking stick. Colorful in language, and wicked smart in perception, he crafted tales that still glow like embers in deep memory. When you observed the Priest story train passing, a chuckle was always the caboose.

Kerry Awn, a member of the Amadillo Art Squad, described Priest in an Austin Chronicle obituary:

Priest was a walking, talking, real-life cowboy hippie cartoon character artist. Ink ran through his veins. When he came to town he changed everything just by being himself. He never heard a story he couldn't embellish, an experience he couldn't top, nor a chance to let you in on a pearl of wisdom spoken in a down-home manner so thick you might have thought it was all an act.

== See also ==
- Music of Austin
