= Vulcan Gas Company (1967–1970) =

60s-70s Texas music venue

Coordinates: 30.26739°N 97.73846°W

Vulcan handbill for December 26 & 27, 1969.

The original Vulcan Gas Company (usually called Vulcan) was the first successful psychedelic music venue in Austin, Texas. The Vulcan opened its doors at 316 Congress Avenue in the fall of 1967, and closed in the summer of 1970. Gary Scanlon, Houston White, Don Hyde, and Sandy Lockett started the VGC. By 1969, management was primarily by White and Lockett, along with Jim Franklin. There was a substantial sound system installed by Sandy Lockett. Charlie Sauer was the principal audio engineer for the last year of operation. Bobby Hedderman and Marty McDermott managed the club for the last few months. Underground cartoonist Gilbert Shelton became their art director in 1967 and drew their weekly posters.

== History ==
In an interview with Don Hyde by Eddie Wilson in 2010, Hyde said that the landlord had tremendous pressure from everywhere to throw them out. He went down to the VGC a couple of times, unannounced, on a Saturday night, walked around and said "I just don't see what everyone is so upset about. It just looks like young people having fun. It is loud! But to each his own." He told Hyde that as long as the rent was paid--$350 a month—they could stay.

A name plaque for the Vulcan is still on the front wall of the historic W.B. Smith building, named after the dry goods store which first occupied the building in 1884. In 1967 this end of the street leading to the Texas Capitol was not particularly prosperous and rents were relatively low.

The Vulcan provided a concert stage for unconventional bands of various genres, most notably the 13th Floor Elevators and the Conqueroo. By 1969, Shiva's Headband became the de facto house band, and in the first half of 1970 the Hub City Movers played frequently at the Vulcan.

The club had homemade benches and old church pews for the audience. The main floor, in front of the stage, was used for dancing. The club owner(s) always wanted all ages to attend and even gave passes out to Jr. High kids who would pass handbills out at lunchtime. Smoking marijuana inside the club was discouraged and rare. Alcohol was discouraged, but common. For some time, the Vulcan used space in the adjoining building to the north for selling sandwiches and soft drinks and as office space, but this auxiliary space was eventually abandoned to reduce rent.

Since there was no liquor license and beer could not be sold, almost all of the income came from gate receipts, typically $1.50 per person. That was the main cause of the club's ultimate demise. Johnny Winter, as a favor to White and Lockett, played a benefit concert, along with the Hub City Movers, March 10 & 11, 1970. Even that concert was not enough to offset ominous financial difficulties.

The elevated stage at the northwest end of the hall was rustic, but the psychedelic light show offset that appearance. The light show was operated from a suspended platform on the south side of the room and near the ceiling – reached by a ladder. There was a large horizontal drain pipe across the back of the stage—that pipe is prominent in many photos of performances at the Vulcan.

There is one feature that most customers never saw, but is still a part of the Vulcan legend: the freight elevator. It was in the back, next to the doors that opened onto the alley. Made of wood and powered by human muscle via a rope that worked a reel of steel cable. The ride up was difficult, but the ride down could be precarious. The cable often got snarled and had to be unsnarled by hand.

For much of the history, concerts were advertised with both large posters and letter-sized handbills, similar to those produced for concerts at the Avalon Ballroom and The Fillmore. Gradually, the larger posters were sacrificed to save cost, and eventually the handbills were abandoned for the same reason. Comprehensive collections are available online.

In 2014 an otherwise unrelated venue in Austin adopted the name Vulcan Gas Company.

== See also ==
- Music of Austin
