= The Skunks =

American rock band

The Skunks are an American three-piece rock band formed in 1977 in Austin, Texas. The band debuted in early 1978 at Raul's, quickly became a mainstay of the Austin music scene. They rapidly expanded their fan base beyond early punk/new wave into clubs whose audiences crossed the spectrum, including the Armadillo World Headquarters, the Continental Club, Dukes Royal Coach, Club Foot, Liberty Lunch, and many others in the late 1970s and early 1980s. The Skunks music channeled classic rock influences, such as The Rolling Stones and The Who, with 1970s cult figures such as the New York Dolls and The Velvet Underground.

== History ==
The Skunks made their Austin debut at Raul's club in February 1978, after having played a series of dates in Dallas and Fort Worth in January of that year with another Austin band, The Violators. The original band members were Jesse Sublett on vocals and bass, "Fazz" Eddie Munoz on guitar and Billy Blackmon on drums. After recording their first eponymous album, the so-called Black LP, Eddie Munoz left for Los Angeles at the end of 1978 and joined The Plimsouls. Jon Dee Graham replaced him on guitar in January 1979, thus forming the definitive Skunks lineup.

Their first single release, "Earthquake Shake", was recorded for $10. Copies are known to fetch hundreds of dollars when they appear at auction. Infused with a powerful guitar attack and Sublett's active, up-front electric bass, The Skunks' sound is best represented in songs like "Cheap Girl" and "Push Me Around", both of which appeared on the first Austin punk compilation album, Live at Raul's.

The Violators co-headlined their opening gig at Raul's with a band, which featured, along with Jesse Sublett, Kathy Valentine who would later join the Go-Go's, Carla Olson and Marilyn Dean. The Skunks and The Violators are generally recognized as Austin's first two punk bands, and this gig as the first Austin punk show. The core fan base that formed at Raul's would provide the alternative voice in an evolving Austin music scene that would eventually be called "The Live Music Capital of the World", spawning the SXSW and ACL festivals. Local Austin punk bands which sprouted from this scene included The Explosives, The Dicks, The Huns, The Big Boys, Terminal Mind, Sharon Tate's Baby, and Butthole Surfers.

The Skunks were one of the first Austin punk bands to tour nationally. They played CBGB's in August 1979 and Max's Kansas City in 1980 and opened for The Ramones, The Police, Gang of Four, Ultravox, The Clash, John Cale, The Cramps and many others. During their sets they were often joined onstage by touring artists such as Elvis Costello, Patti Smith, and Joe Ely, as well as members of The Clash, Cheap Trick and Blondie.

The Skunks were inducted into the Austin Music Hall of Fame in 2008.

=== Formation ===
Founders Jesse Sublett and Eddie Munoz started played together in the glam blues band Jelly Roll from 1975 to 1977 before recruiting Billy Blackmon and forming the initial lineup of The Skunks. After Munoz's departure in 1978 he was replaced on guitar by Jon Dee Grahm who remained with the band until the summer of 1980 and was replaced by Doug Murray, formerly of Terminal Mind. Blackmon left the band in 1982 and was replaced on drums by Doug Murray's brother, Greg Murray, a lineup that lasted until 1983 when conflicting opinions within the band led to their break up during pre-production of their second LP on Republic Records. Austin rock critic Margaret Moser writes: "In Austin's punk rock history book, the Skunks are the first page. From the time they played the original alt-rock nightspot, Raul's, through lineup changes that eventually brought them right back to the beginning, this trio toughed it out. Bassist Jesse Sublett, guitarist Jon Dee Graham, and drummer Billy Blackmon's muscular power punk is still as potent and danceable now as it was 20 years ago."

Jesse reunited what is considered the classic lineup of Sublett, Graham, and Blackmon in 1985 for a reunion show at Austin's Liberty Lunch. Starting in 2000 this lineup began playing annual reunion gigs at The Continental Club in Austin, Texas. On March 27, 2026, Jon Dee Graham died at the age of 67.

== Discography ==
Studio albums

- The Skunks aka the Black Album (Rude Records, 1980)
- The Skunks aka the Purple Album (Republic, 1982)

Live albums

- Earthquake Shake live CD (Skunks Records, 2001)
- Earthquake Shake vinyl LP (Rave Up Records, 2002)

Compilation albums

- Live at Raul's (Raul's Records, 1979)

Extended plays

- Cheap Girl (Skunks Records, 1980)

Singles

- "Earthquake Shake" b/w "Can't Get Loose" (Skunks Records, 1979) (re-released by Last Laugh Records in 2011)
- "The Racket" b/w "What Do You Want" (Skunks Records, 1981)
