= Armadillo World Headquarters, Austin, TX, 6/13/75 =

- Cover illustration by Micael Priest

Live album by New Riders of the Purple Sage
- Released: November 1, 2005
- Recorded: June 13, 1975
- Genre: Country rock
- Length: 125:59
- Label: Kufala
- Producer: Rob Bleetstein

New Riders of the Purple Sage chronology
Veneta, Oregon, 8/27/72 (2004)	Armadillo World Headquarters, Austin, TX, 6/13/75 (2005)	Cactus Juice (2006)

Professional ratings
Review scores
Source	Rating
Allmusic	3.5/5 stars

Armadillo World Headquarters, Austin, TX, 6/13/75 is an album by the country rock band the New Riders of the Purple Sage. It was recorded live on June 13, 1975, at the Armadillo World Headquarters in Austin, Texas, and released on November 1, 2005. It was the fourth complete New Riders concert that was recorded in the 1970s and released in the 2000s as an album on the Kufala Recordings label.

At the time of the concert at the Armadillo, Skip Battin was the New Riders' bass player. Battin wrote or co-wrote three songs that appear on the album. Previously a member of the Byrds, Battin had joined the New Riders in 1974 after Dave Torbert left to join Kingfish. Also in the NRPS lineup for this recording were band co-founders John "Marmaduke" Dawson and David Nelson, and long-time members Buddy Cage and Spencer Dryden.

== Recording and sound quality ==
According to a statement on the back cover, the CD "was mastered directly from the original quarter track analog reel to reel tape at 7.5 ips. The few initial anomalies at the beginning of the show have been preserved for authenticity."

== Track listing ==
Disc One
No.	Title	Length
1.	"I Don't Know You" (John Dawson)	3:55
2.	"Panama Red" (Peter Rowan)	3:06
3.	"Lonesome L.A. Cowboy" (Rowan)	3:59
4.	"Austin, Texas" (Skip Battin)	2:59
5.	"Instant Armadillo Blues" (Dawson)	3:05
6.	"Teardrops In My Eyes" (Red Allen, Tommy Sutton)	2:42
7.	"Dirty Business" (Dawson)	8:04
8.	"Henry" (Dawson)	4:58
9.	"Sutter's Mill" (Dawson)	2:26
10.	"Dim Lights, Thick Smoke (And Loud, Loud Music)" (Joe Maphis, Max Fidler, Rose Lee Maphis)	4:16
11.	"Louisiana Lady" (Dawson)	3:51
12.	"Strangers On A Train" (Battin, Kim Fowley)	3:07
13.	"Portland Woman" (Dawson)	14:09

Disc Two
No.	Title	Length
1.	"I'm Bringing Home Good News" (Merle Haggard)	3:54
2.	"You Angel You" (Bob Dylan)	3:26
3.	"She's No Angel" (Wanda Ballman, J.W. Arnold)	3:06
4.	"My Dog Peaches" (Dawson)	4:09
5.	"On The Amazon" (Battin, Fowley)	3:55
6.	"Before The Next Teardrop Falls" (Ben Peters, Vivian Keith)	2:26
7.	"Over And Over" (Dawson)	3:05
8.	"Whiskey" (Dawson)	4:15
9.	"Crooked Judge" (Nelson, Robert Hunter)	8:54
10.	"I Will Never Make You Blue" (Frank Wakefield)	3:53
11.	"(Take Me Back to) New Orleans" (Frank Guida, Joseph Royster)	3:45
12.	"La Bamba" (Ritchie Valens)	3:26
13.	"Glendale Train" (Dawson)	5:01
14.	"Dead Flowers" (Mick Jagger, Keith Richards)	5:15
15.	"Nadine" (Chuck Berry)	6:34

== Personnel ==
=== New Riders of the Purple Sage ===
- John Dawson – guitar, vocals
- David Nelson – guitar, vocals
- Buddy Cage – pedal steel guitar
- Spencer Dryden – drums
- Skip Battin – bass, vocals

=== Production ===
- Rob Bleetstein – producer
- Stephen Barncard – mastering
- Onion Audio – recording
