= New sincerity =

Artistic and philosophical movement

New sincerity (closely related to and sometimes described as synonymous with post-postmodernism) is a trend in music, aesthetics, literary fiction, film criticism, poetry, literary criticism and philosophy that generally describes creative works that expand upon and break away from concepts of postmodernist irony and cynicism.

Like many terms related to postmodernism and metamodernism, “new sincerity” has been used broadly and vaguely to refer to many styles and attitudes. Generally, it has come to refer to efforts at authenticity and good faith, which are often considered non- or anti-postmodernist, that also nonetheless acknowledges and often incorporates characteristics of postmodernism such as irony and deconstruction.

Its usage dates back to the mid-1980s; however, it was popularized in the 1990s by American author David Foster Wallace.

== In music ==
"New sincerity" was used as a collective name for a loose group of alternative rock bands, centered in Austin, Texas, in the years from about 1985 to 1990, who were perceived as reacting to the ironic and cynical outlook of then-prominent music movements like punk rock and new wave. The use of "new sincerity" in connection with these bands began with an off-handed comment by Austin punk rock artist and author Jesse Sublett to his friend, local music writer Margaret Moser. According to author Barry Shank, Sublett said: "All those new sincerity bands, they're crap." Sublett (at his own website) states that he was misquoted, and actually told Moser, "It's all new sincerity to me ... It's not my cup of tea." In any event, Moser began using the term in print, and it ended up becoming the catch phrase for these bands.

Nationally, the most successful "new sincerity" band was the Reivers (originally called "Zeitgeist"), who released four well-received albums between 1985 and 1991. True Believers, led by Alejandro Escovedo and Jon Dee Graham, also received extensive critical praise and local acclaim in Austin, but the band had difficulty capturing its live sound on recordings, among other problems. Other important "new sincerity" bands include Doctors Mob, Wild Seeds, and Glass Eye. Another significant "new sincerity" figure was the eccentric, critically acclaimed songwriter Daniel Johnston.

Despite extensive critical attention (including national coverage in Rolling Stone and a 1985 episode of the MTV program The Cutting Edge), none of the "new sincerity" bands met with much commercial success, and the "scene" ended within a few years.

Other music writers have used "new sincerity" to describe later performers Arcade Fire, Conor Oberst, Cat Power, Devendra Banhart, Joanna Newsom, Neutral Milk Hotel, Sufjan Stevens, Idlewild, as well as Austin's Okkervil River Leatherbag, and Michael Waller.

== In film criticism ==
Critic Jim Collins introduced the concept of "new sincerity" to film criticism in his 1993 essay titled "Genericity in the 90s: Eclectic Irony and the New Sincerity". In this essay he contrasts films that treat genre conventions with "eclectic irony" and those that treat them seriously, with "new sincerity". Collins describes,

the "new sincerity" of films like Field of Dreams (1989), Dances With Wolves (1990), and Hook (1991), all of which depend not on hybridization, but on an "ethnographic" rewriting of the classic genre film that serves as their inspiration, all attempting, using one strategy or another, to recover a lost "purity", which apparently pre-dated even the golden age of film genre.

=== Cinematic and televised examples ===
- Bonnie and Clyde (1967)
- Field of Dreams (1989)
- Dances With Wolves (1990)
- Ghost (1990)
- Hook (1991)
- Forrest Gump (1994)
- The Lion King (1994)
- Amélie (2001)
- The Royal Tenenbaums (2001)
- The Man Who Wasn't There (2001)
- Eternal Sunshine of the Spotless Mind (2004)
- Garden State (2004)
- The Life Aquatic with Steve Zissou (2004)
- The Twilight Saga (2008–2012)
- Glee (2009–2015)
- Frances Ha (2012)
- Being Flynn (2012)
- Moonrise Kingdom (2012)
- The Secret Life of Walter Mitty (2013)
- Nathan for You (2013–2017)
- Sieranevada (2016)
- Silent Night (2017)
- Avatar: The Way of Water (2022)
- R.M.N. (2022)
- Creed III (2023)
- Wonka (2023)

== In literary fiction and criticism ==
In response to the hegemony of metafictional and self-conscious irony in contemporary fiction, writer David Foster Wallace predicted, in his 1993 essay "E Unibus Pluram: Television and U.S. Fiction", a new literary movement which would espouse something like the new sincerity ethos:

The next real literary "rebels" in this country might well emerge as some weird bunch of "anti-rebels," born oglers who dare to back away from ironic watching, who have the childish gall to actually endorse single-entendre values. Who treat old untrendy human troubles and emotions in U.S. life with reverence and conviction. Who eschew self-consciousness and fatigue. These anti-rebels would be outdated, of course, before they even started. Too sincere. Clearly repressed. Backward, quaint, naive, anachronistic. Maybe that'll be the point, why they'll be the next real rebels. Real rebels, as far as I can see, risk things. Risk disapproval. The old postmodern insurgents risked the gasp and squeal: shock, disgust, outrage, censorship, accusations of socialism, anarchism, nihilism. The new rebels might be the ones willing to risk the yawn, the rolled eyes, the cool smile, the nudged ribs, the parody of gifted ironists, the "How banal." Accusations of sentimentality, melodrama. Credulity. Willingness to be suckered by a world of lurkers and starers who fear gaze and ridicule above imprisonment without law. Who knows.

This was further examined on the blog Fiction Advocate:

The theory is this: Infinite Jest is Wallace's attempt to both manifest and dramatize a revolutionary fiction style that he called for in his essay "E Unibus Pluram: Television and U.S. Fiction". The style is one in which a new sincerity will overturn the ironic detachment that hollowed out contemporary fiction towards the end of the 20th century. Wallace was trying to write an antidote to the cynicism that had pervaded and saddened so much of American culture in his lifetime. He was trying to create an entertainment that would get us talking again.

In his 2010 essay "David Foster Wallace and the New Sincerity in American Fiction", Adam Kelly argues that Wallace's fiction, and that of his generation, is marked by a revival and theoretical reconception of sincerity, challenging the emphasis on authenticity that dominated twentieth-century literature and conceptions of the self. Additionally, numerous authors have been described as contributors to the new sincerity movement, including Jonathan Franzen, Marilynne Robinson, Zadie Smith, Dave Eggers, Stephen Graham Jones, Michael Chabon, and Victor Pelevin.

== In philosophy ==
"New sincerity" has also sometimes been used to refer to a philosophical concept deriving from the basic tenets of performatism. It is also seen as one of the key characteristics of metamodernism. Related literature includes Wendy Steiner's The Trouble with Beauty and Elaine Scarry's On Beauty and Being Just. Related movements may include post-postmodernism, New Puritans, Stuckism, the kitsch movement and remodernism, as well as the Dogme 95 film movement led by Lars von Trier.

== As a cultural movement ==
"New sincerity" has been espoused since 2002 by radio host Jesse Thorn of PRI's The Sound of Young America (now Bullseye), self-described as "the public radio program about things that are awesome". Thorn characterizes new sincerity as a cultural movement defined by dicta including "maximum fun" and "be more awesome". It celebrates outsized celebration of joy, and rejects irony, and particularly ironic appreciation of cultural products. Thorn has promoted this concept on his program and in interviews.

In a September 2009 interview, Thorn commented that "new sincerity" had begun as "a silly, philosophical movement that me and some friends made up in college" and that "everything that we said was a joke, but at the same time it wasn't all a joke in the sense that we weren't being arch or we weren't being campy. While we were talking about ridiculous, funny things we were sincere about them."

Thorn's concept of "new sincerity" as a social response has gained popularity since his introduction of the term in 2002. Several point to the September 11, 2001, attacks and the subsequent wake of events that created this movement, in which there was a drastic shift in tone. The 1990s were considered a period of artistic works rife with irony, and the attacks shocked a change in the American culture. Graydon Carter, editor of Vanity Fair, published an editorial a few weeks after the attacks claiming that "this was the end of the age of irony". Jonathan D. Fitzgerald for The Atlantic suggests this new movement could also be attributed to broader periodic shifts that occur in culture.

As a result of this movement, several cultural works were considered elements of "new sincerity", but this was also seen to be a mannerism adopted by the general public, to show appreciation for cultural works that they happened to enjoy. Andrew Watercutter of Wired saw this as having been able to enjoy one's guilty pleasures without having to feel guilty about enjoying them, and being able to share that appreciation with others. One such example of a "new sincerity" movement is the brony fandom, generally adult and primarily male fans of the 2010 animated show My Little Pony: Friendship Is Magic which is produced by Hasbro to sell its toys to young girls. These fans have been called "internet neo-sincerity at its best", unabashedly enjoying the show and challenging the preconceived gender roles that such a show ordinarily carries.

A review of a 2016 play by Alena Smith The New Sincerity observes that it "captures the spirit of an age lightly lived and easily forgotten, which strives for a significance and a magnitude that won't be easily achieved".

In the early 2020s, the shift toward a more overt embrace of new sincerity was codified in James Poniewozik's New York Times piece titled, "How TV Went From David Brent to Ted Lasso." Poniewozik details the shift, arguing that "In TV's ambitious comedies, as well as dramas, the arc of the last 20 years is not from bold risk-taking to spineless inoffensiveness. But it is, in broad terms, a shift from irony to sincerity. By 'irony' here, I don't mean the popular equation of the term with cynicism or snark. I mean an ironic mode of narrative, in which what a show 'thinks' is different from what its protagonist does. Two decades ago, TV's most distinctive stories were defined by a tone of dark or acerbic detachment. Today, they're more likely to be earnest and direct." Poniewozik goes on to address possible impetus for doing away with the disjoint between writer and character ascribing some cause to what Emily Nussbaum calls "bad fans", but the thrust of his critique centers on the possible shift towards the representation of new and previously unrepresented voices. As Poniewozik puts it, "In some cases, it's also a question of who has gotten to make TV since 2001. Antiheroes like David Brent and Tony Soprano, after all, came along after white guys like them had centuries to be heroes. The voices and faces of the medium have diversified, and if you're telling the stories of people and communities that TV never made room for before, skewering might not be your first choice of tone. I don't want to oversimplify this: Series like Atlanta, Ramy, Master of None and Insecure all have complex stances toward their protagonists. But they also have more sympathy toward them than, say, Arrested Development." With this perspective in mind and considering the shift towards an embrace of diverse views and opinions, the appearance of new sincerity in film and television is understandable if not expected. However, prior to the current shift towards new sincerity, popular culture had embraced a period of "high irony", as Poniewozik deems it.

== Regional variants ==
=== Russia ===
In Russia, the term new sincerity (novaya iskrennost) was used as early as the mid-1980s or early 1990s by dissident poet Dmitry Prigov and critic Mikhail Epstein, as a response to the dominant sense of absurdity in late Soviet and post-Soviet culture. In Epstein's words, "Postconceptualism, or the New Sincerity, is an experiment in resuscitating "fallen", dead languages with a renewed pathos of love, sentimentality and enthusiasm.

This conception of "new sincerity" meant the avoidance of cynicism, but not necessarily of irony. In the words of Alexei Yurchak of the University of California, Berkeley, it "is a particular brand of irony, which is sympathetic and warm, and allows its authors to remain committed to the ideals that they discuss, while also being somewhat ironic about this commitment".

Nowadays New Sincerity is being contraposed not to Soviet literature, but to postmodernism. Dmitry Vodennikov has been acclaimed as the leader of the new wave of Russian New Sincerity, as was Victor Pelevin.

=== In American poetry ===
Since 2005, poets including Reb Livingston, Joseph Massey, Andrew Mister, and Anthony Robinson have collaborated in a blog-driven poetry movement, described by Massey as "a 'new sincerity' brewing in American poetry – a contrast to the cold, irony-laden poetry dominating the journals and magazines and new books of poetry". Other poets named as associated with this movement, or its tenets, have included David Berman, Catherine Wagner, Dean Young, Matt Hart, Miranda July (who is also a filmmaker), Tao Lin, Steve Roggenbuck, D. S. Chapman, Frederick Seidel, Arielle Greenberg, Karyna McGlynn, and Mira Gonzalez.

In More Deaths than One (2014), the American/New Zealand writer and singer-songwriter Gary Jeshel Forrester examined searched for the Central Illinois roots of David Foster Wallace during a picaresque journey from New Zealand to America. In this novel, Forrester wrote that Foster Wallace "proposes to fill the postmodernist void with a rough synthesis of the two predecessors from the twentieth century [modernism and post-modernism]. In the new paradigm, metaphysics, epistemology, and ontology all have their places, but the overriding concern is with yet another division of philosophy – ethics. It's okay to search for values and meaning, even as we continue to be skeptical." In 2026, Forrester's volume of poetry, The Ancient Light of the Dead, was published in Australia. The 84 poems were written while Forrester was living in the post-Soviet country of Georgia. Upon release, the poems were described as "a casual stroll through the kind of eclectic village cemetery that each of us designs and builds over the course of a lifetime, and that each of us will one day inhabit."

== See also ==
- American eccentric cinema
- Metamodernism
- Hopecore
- The Cult of Sincerity
- Post-irony
- Reconstructivism
