= Bill Narum =

Bill Narum (January 11, 1947 – November 18, 2009) was an artist, illustrator, and Texas counter-culture icon known for his work in popular entertainment, and for being one of the few non-natives to have lived with the Tarahumara tribe of northern Mexico in Copper Canyon.

== Biography ==
In the late 1960s Narum co-founded the Houston, Texas FM rock and roll radio station KLOL and worked as art director for Space City News, an underground newspaper. He also worked with KPFT-FM, the Pacifica radio station in Houston, and was a founder of Space City Video. In the 1970s a friendship with guitarist Billy Gibbons led him to become the house artist for rock band ZZ Top, designing posters, album covers, and stage sets. Narum also provided murals for ZZ Top's fleet of semis.

Narum created concert posters for many artists including Captain Beefheart, Ravi Shankar and Humble Pie. Music venues in Austin such as the Armadillo World Headquarters and Continental Club also used Narum's posters to promote their monthly slate of acts.

In 1993 he was awarded a Certificate of Appreciation from the City of Austin, Texas, where he resided.

Narum later went on to work for the computer game development company Origin Systems, and followed by opening his own game development company, Go-Go Studios in Austin, Texas in the mid-1990s where he acted as art director and CEO.

Narum died on November 18, 2009, at his home in Austin. Close friend, Margaret Moser, reported that the cause of death was an "apparent heart attack or something that took him quickly while sitting in his studio at the art table in his chair." Bill was deeply loved by his family, including his wife of the heart Gloria, sisters Wendy Narum-Hart and Heidi Narum Hyatt, brothers Jon Eric Narum and Kurt Narum (deceased), daughters Michelle Narum and Nico Narum D'Auterive, granddaughter Alexandria Groce, and grandson Jules Narum.

In 2005 he was elected president of the South Austin Popular Culture Center. A retrospect of Narum's work was the subject of a 2005 art show at the museum, titled “You Call That Art.”

On November 28, 2009, there was a tribute at Threadgill's restaurant in Austin, to honor Narum, with proceeds going to establish a memorial fund.
