= Live Shots =

Live album by The Joe Ely Band
- Released: 1980
- Recorded: 1980, London, England
- Genres: Texas Country, progressive country, country rock, outlaw country
- Length: 54:21
- Label: MCA
- Producer: Michael Brovsky

The Joe Ely Band chronology
Down on the Drag (1979)	Live Shots (1980)	Musta Notta Gotta Lotta (1981)

Professional ratings
Review scores
Source	Rating
AllMusic	4.5/5 stars
Robert Christgau	B+
Rolling Stone	(favorable)

Live Shots is a live album recorded in London by American country outfit the Joe Ely Band during a 1980 tour supporting the Clash. The tour occurred at a high point in the Clash's popularity just after the release of the album London Calling.

The album was first only released in the UK, but a US release soon followed due to high demand. The 1993 reissue CD included the tracks from the Texas Special bonus EP that had accompanied the Live Shots LP.

== Track listing ==
All songs by Joe Ely, except as indicated.

Side one (of original LP):

1. "Fingernails" — 3:00
2. "Midnight Shift" (Jimmie Ainsworth, Earl Lee) — 3:00
3. "Honky Tonk Masquerade" — 3:49
4. "Honky Tonkin'" (Hank Williams) — 3:12
5. "Long Snake Moan" (Arranged and adapted by Ely) — 5:10

Side two:

1. "I Had My Hopes Up High" — 3:13
2. "She Never Spoke Spanish to Me" (Butch Hancock) — 3:53
3. "Johnny's Blues" — 4:48
4. "Fools Fall in Love" (Butch Hancock) — 4:37
5. "Boxcars" (Butch Hancock) — 4:37

Texas Special EP:

1. "Crazy Lemon" — 3:56
2. "Not Fade Away" (Norman Petty, Charles Hardin) — 3:42
3. "Treat Me Like a Saturday Night" (Jimmie Dale Gilmore) — 3:09
4. "Wishin' for You" (Butch Hancock) — 4:41

== Live Shots credits ==
=== The Joe Ely Band ===
- Joe Ely — electric guitar & vocals
- Ponty Bone — accordion
- Robert Marquam — drums
- Jesse Taylor — electric lead guitar
- Gregg Wright (credited as "Greg Wright") — bass
- Lloyd Maines — pedal steel and background vocals

=== Guest musicians ===
- Carlene Carter — vocals on "Honky Tonkin'"
- Mick Gallagher — keyboards
- Reese Wynans — keyboards

=== Production ===
- Recorded live in London, a Free Flow Production in association with Joe Ely
- Produced by Michael Brovsky
- Engineered by Chet Himes, Remix-Pecan Street Studios, Austin, Texas
- Assistant Engineer — Greg Klinginsmith
- Live Engineer Wayne (Hatch) Hatchel

=== Artwork ===
- Graphics & design — Guy Juke, Austin, Texas
- Artwork — Cream, Bayswater, London
- Snapshots — Pete Vernon
- Repackage design — Carmelo Roman
- Liner notes — Max Bell

== Texas Special credits ==
=== Musicians ===
- Michael Robberson — bass guitar
- Michael Kindred — keyboards
- "Smokey" Joe Miller — saxophone,

=== Production ===
- Produced by Al Kooper
- Recorded live in Texas by Reelsound
- Engineered by Bob Edwards
- Remixed at Studio South, Austin, Texas
- "Not Fade Away" recording courtesy of WLIR in New York City

=== Artwork ===
- Photography/design — Patti Heid/Art Ache
- Ely lettering — Guy Juke
- Art production — Dick Reeves and John Wilson, Austin, Texas

== Charts ==
year	chart	peak
1981	Billboard Pop Albums	159

== Releases ==
year	format	label	catalog #
1980	LP	MCA	5262
1980	LP	Southcoast/MCA	MCAD-10816
1993	CD	MCA	10816
1993	cassette	MCA	10816
