= True Believers (band) =

American rock band

- Origin: Austin, Texas
- Genres: Country rock, hard rock
- Years active: 1982–1987, 2012
- Labels: Rounder, EMI America, Rykodisc
- Past members: Alejandro Escovedo; Javier Escovedo, Kevin Foley, Denny DeGorio, Jon Dee Graham, Hector Munoz, J.D. Foster

The True Believers were a rock band from Austin, Texas active from 1982 to 1987. Founded by brothers Alejandro and Javier Escovedo, True Believers were rooted in hard rock with touches of country and the rebellious energy of punk rock. They found critical praise and toured with many leading bands of the 1980s but never broke out of cult status to achieve mainstream success due in part to their hard-to-classify style.

== History ==
The True Believers were founded in 1982 by singer-guitarist Alejandro Escovedo, formerly of the Nuns, and his brother Javier Escovedo, formerly of the Zeros. The other two initial members of the band were drummer Kevin Foley (who was formerly in the Nuns with Alejandro) and bassist Denny DeGorio. Soon after they were founded, the band became very successful on the Texas club scene, and by 1984, they were touring with such bands as Los Lobos, Rain Parade, and Love Tractor. True Believers appeared in a 1985 episode of the MTV program I.R.S. Records Presents The Cutting Edge, where they were covered as one of the Austin bands then sometimes grouped together under the name "New Sincerity".

The band released its first album, True Believers, in 1986 on Rounder Records. The album was recorded in less than a week for less than $10,000 with Jon Dee Graham, and was produced by Jim Dickinson. EMI America found out about the album from a distribution deal they had with Rounder at the time. EMI was so impressed by the band's debut album that they bought them out of their contract with Rounder, giving them more money to record their second album. In early 1987, they began recording their second album with producer Jeff Glixman, but soon after it was finished, EMI America was folded into Manhattan Records, and the album was dropped from the new label's release schedule.

In late 1987, Javier left the band, which broke up soon afterward. The band's second album was not released until 1994, when Rykodisc included it on Hard Road, a reissue of the band's debut album.

True Believers reformed in 2012 for a well-received performance at the SXSW festival. On March 27, 2026, Jon Dee Graham died at the age of 67.

== Legacy ==
William Michael Smith of the Houston Press has written that "In an industry littered with tragic stories of bad luck and poor decisions, the True Believers' tale ranks right at the top." Jason Cohen of Texas Monthly has said that the Believers were "widely considered to be Austin's best band of the mid-eighties."

== Discography ==
- True Believers (Rounder, 1986)
- Hard Road (Rykodisc compilation, 1994)
