= Jesse Sublett =

American musician, writer, and visual artist (born 1954)

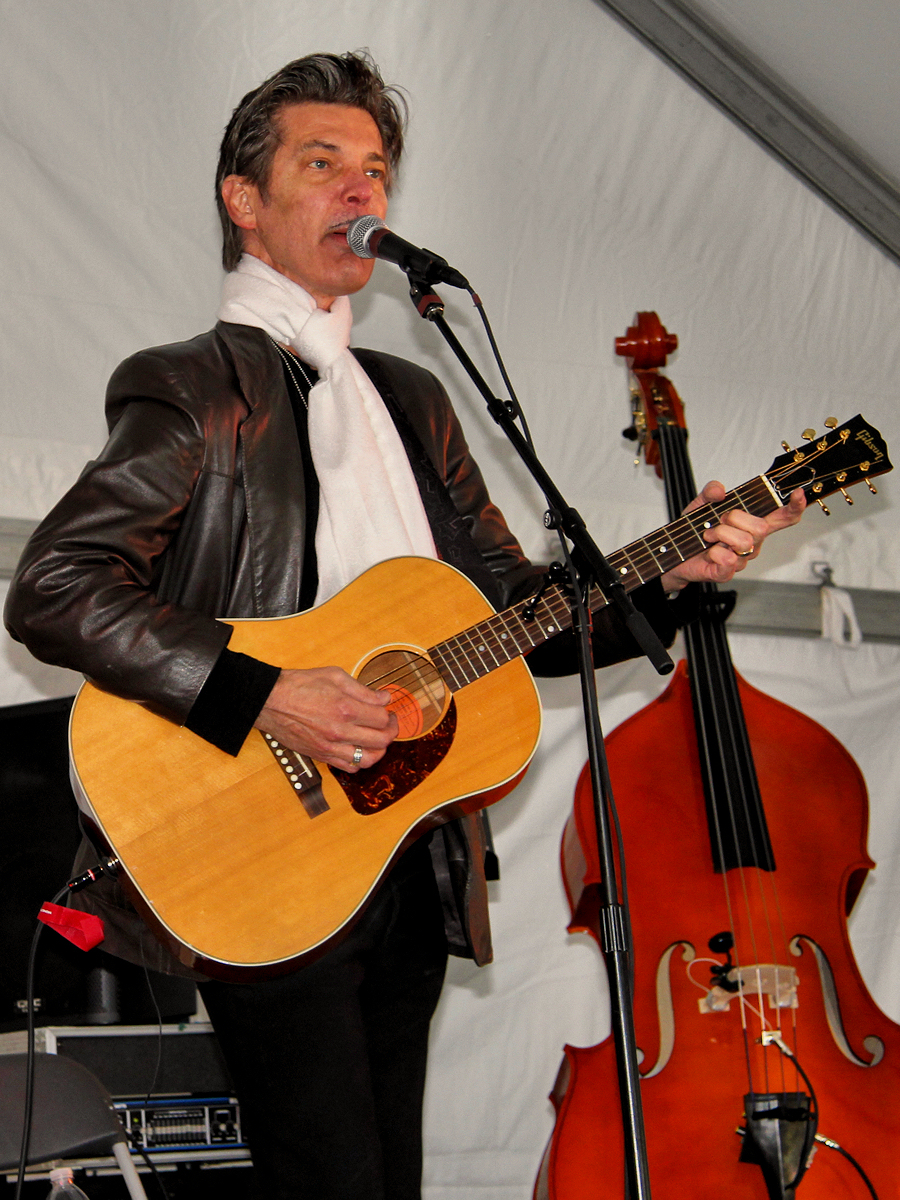
Jesse Sublett performing at the 2012 Texas Book Festival

Jesse Sublett (born May 15, 1954) is a musician, writer, and visual artist from Austin, Texas. As a musician, he is best known for his long-running rock trio, The Skunks. His essays and journalism have appeared in a wide range of publications, and he is also known for his mystery novels featuring a bass-playing sleuth named Martin Fender.

== Early life ==
Jesse Sublett was born in Johnson City, Texas, where he was valedictorian at Lyndon B. Johnson High School. He attended Southwest Texas State University for two years, then moved to Austin in 1974.

== Personal life ==
Sublett and his wife, Lois Richwine, were married in 1984. They have one son, Dashiell Sublett, who was born in Los Angeles in 1993.

== Music career ==
Sublett founded The Skunks in January 1978 with bandmates Bill Blackmon and Eddie Munoz. Soon thereafter, The Skunks and The Violators (a band that included Sublett on bass guitar along with Kathy Valentine (later of the Go-Go's), Carla Olson, and Marilyn Dean) made their Austin debut at a University of Texas area club called Raul's, marking the beginning of the punk/new wave scene in Austin.

Sublett left The Violators after six months to concentrate on the Skunks, and the Violators disbanded thereafter, but the Skunks recorded numerous singles, EPs and LPs, and played across the US, including the punk meccas of New York City, CBGB's and Max's Kansas City. Sublett sang and played electric bass in the band. He also wrote most of the band's original material. Munoz left the band at the end of 1978 to join the Plimsouls. With his replacement on guitar, Jon Dee Graham, the band saw some touring success as headliners and as opening act for The Clash, The Ramones, and John Cale. The band more or less disbanded in 1983, but more recently have performed annual reunion shows at their favorite Austin club, the Continental Club. The Skunks were inducted in the Austin Music Hall of Fame in 2007.

Sublett is credited with naming the "New Sincerity" movement of alternative rock bands that arose in Austin from about 1985 to 1990, and who were perceived as reacting to the more ironic outlook of punk rock and New Wave bands. He used the phrase during a casual conversation with his friend, local music writer Margaret Moser. Moser began using the term in print, and it ended up becoming the catchphrase for these bands.

Sublett played in numerous other ensembles over the years, including Secret Six, Flex, and a stint playing with ex-Rolling Stones guitarist Mick Taylor and Carla Olson, as well as a band called World's Cutest Killers featuring Kathy Valentine, Kelly Johnson (Girlschool) and Jebin Bruni (Public Image Ltd.). Sublett currently performs in various club ensembles, variously known as Jesse Sublett's Big Three Trio and The Murder Ballad Show (the latter featuring his longtime collaborator and friend, Jon Dee Graham). His most recent musical performances feature his upright bass work, a grittier vocal style and an ongoing fascination with the work of Howlin' Wolf and various jazz, blues and traditional composers.

== Writing career ==
Sublett began writing seriously in the 1980s. As of 2024, 12 books have been published under his name. His first novel, Rock Critic Murders, was published by Viking Penguin in 1987, followed by Tough Baby and Boiled in Concrete.

Sublett's 2004 memoir, Never the Same Again: A Rock 'N' Roll Gothic, relates the story of his girlfriend's murder when he was 22, his career with The Skunks, and his battle with throat cancer. Writing in the Los Angeles Times, critic Marion Winik described the book as "riveting" and chose it for the Times' list of "most surprising new books". Austin Chronicle critic Greg Beets described it as "a gripping memoir that never feels forced or emotionally manipulative... Sublett's prose remains rich, fierce, and humbling."

"Adaptation," Sublett's 2008 piece in The Texas Observer, chronicles his years-long work researching and writing a book about the Austin underworld of the 1950s-1970s, centered largely upon a group known as the Overton Gang. Sublett's nonfiction book on the gang was published in 2015, titled 1960s Austin Gangsters: Organized Crime that Rocked the Capital. The Austin Chronicle called it "a remarkable piece of scholarship" that "makes you think that Sublett should be hailed as an Ellroy-level master of modern crime writing." Sublett mined the history of Austin crime and corruption in the 1970s for another true crime chronicle in Last Gangster in Austin: Frank Smith, Ronnie Earle, and the End of a Junkyard Mafia, published in 2022 by University of Texas Press. The book is "a rollicking narrative of a criminal underworld," wrote critic Jason Mellard, as well as "an exemplary microhistory with close attention to currents that broader accounts of modern Austin have missed, if not outright ignored."

Sublett's essays and journalism pieces have appeared in the New York Times, Texas Monthly, and Texas Highways.

Sublett's adaptation (written with director/producer Stephen Purvis and Tom Huckabee) of the Austin play In the West was produced as a feature film entitled Deep in the Heart (of Texas).

Sublett has also written extensively for non-fiction television, contributing to numerous series broadcast on History such as The Great Ships, Search and Rescue, and Boneyards: The Secret Lives of Machines. A two-hour documentary, The Killer Storm (chronicling the so-called "Perfect Storm" of 1991), which Sublett wrote, aired on the History Channel in 1999 and also premiered at the South by Southwest Film Festival in Austin. He wrote the original book for a stage play called Marathon which debuted in 2007 with music by Austin-based singer-songwriter Darden Smith. In 2009, however, Sublett asserted his sole authorship of the play and announced that future productions would feature his own original score.

Broke, Not Broken: Homer Maxey's Texas Bank War, by Broadus Spivey and Jesse Sublett, published in 2014 by Texas Tech University Press, is one of several works co-authored by Sublett. Armadillo World Headquarters: A Memoir, by Eddie Wilson with Sublett, published in late March 2017, tells the history of the famed music hall affectionately known as "the 'Dillo" which served as an Austin music industry stage and incubator of Austin culture far beyond the decade it was in existence (1970-1980). And, in Esther's Follies The laughs, the gossip, and the story behind Texas' most celebrated comedy troupe, Sublett chronicled the colorful history of Esther's Follies, Austin's longest running comedy, magic, and political satire stage show, which debuted in 1977 on the city's infamous downtown Sixth Street.

Sublett has also written a history of the Texas Turnpike Authority. His papers are collected in the Southwestern Writers Collection of the Wittliff Collections of Alkek Library at Texas State University–San Marcos.
