= Nels Jacobson =

American art historian

Jagmo, born Nels Jacobson, is an American artist and poster art historian.

== Early life ==
He was born in Chicago in 1949.

== Career ==
He moved to Austin, Texas in 1978 and began creating rock posters in 1981. For three years during the early 1980s Jacobson served as bar manager and promotional director for Austin's Club Foot.

He designed posters for live-music venues such as Liberty Lunch, Cain's Ballroom and The Fillmore, and for performers such as Stevie Ray Vaughan, the Ramones, Divine, Roky Erickson, Etta James, Dead Kennedys, the B-52's, Bonnie Raitt, Joe Ely, Los Lobos, the Pixies, Iggy Pop, Willie Nelson, Fela Kuti, Jimmie Dale Gilmore and Jerry Jeff Walker.

In 1987, Jacobson helped organize the Texas-U.S.S.R. Musicians' Exchange tour of the Soviet Union and accompanied the performers to Leningrad, Moscow and Kyiv. He was art director for South by Southwest (SXSW) during its first six years, designing the original logo. In 1998 he founded the SXSW Continuing Legal Education program, which he continued to oversee in 2019.

Jacobson served on the packaging Grammy Award committees for the Texas and San Francisco chapters of the National Academy of Recording Arts and Sciences, and is a founding Director of the American Poster Institute and the South Austin Museum of Popular Culture, and a board member of The Rock Poster Society.

== Selected writings ==
- "Art Laws and Outlaws: Legal Issues in Music Graphics" from SXSW 2015 (course materials for Continuing Legal Education Program) Art Laws and Outlaws
- Introductory essay "Colorful Tales and Early Techniques" in Homegrown: Austin Music Posters, 1967 to 1982 (Alan Schaefer, ed., University of Texas Press 2015) ISBN 978-0-292-76819-2
- "Art of Rock and Roll" from the 24th Annual Entertainment Law Institute course book (TexasBarCLE and the Entertainment and Sports Law Section of the State Bar of Texas 2014)
- Introduction to chapter about Flatstock 4 in Rock Poster Show: Flatstock Volume One (Soundscreen Design 2010) ISBN 978-0-9843028-0-2
- “Rock Music Posters and the Law” from Entertainment and Sports Lawyer Volume 23/Number 1 (American Bar Association Spring 2005) ISSN 0732-1880 http://www.jagmo.com/articles/Posters_Law.pdf
- ”Foreword,” with Dirk Fowler, to Swag 2: Rock Posters of the '90s and Beyond by Spencer Drate and Judith Salavetz, (Harry N. Abrams, Inc. 2005) ISBN 0-8109-9235-3
- “Armadillos, Peccadillos, and the Maverick Posterists of Austin, Texas” from Prints and Printmakers of Texas: Proceedings of the Twentieth Annual North American Print Conference (Ron Tyler ed., Texas State Historical Association 1997) ISBN 0-87611-137-1
- “Faith, Hope & Parody: Campbell v. Acuff-Rose, ‘Oh, Pretty Woman,’ and Parodists' Rights” from the Houston Law Review Volume 31/Number 3 (1994) ISSN 0018-6694
- "The Maverick Tradition: Postering in Austin, Texas, Part II" from OFFtheWALL Volume No. 1/Issue No. 3 (1992)
- "The Maverick Tradition: Postering in Austin, Texas, Part I" from OFFtheWALL Volume No. 1/Issue No. 2 (1991)
- “Austin Poster Art” from The Austin Chronicle Vol. III/No.23 (July 13, 1984) ISSN 1074-0740
- "The Request" (a poem) from Rolling Stone Issue No. 292 (May 31, 1979) ISSN 0035-791X
