= Club Foot =

Music venue in Austin, Texas, United States

Club Foot was a large live-music venue in Austin, Texas, in the early 1980s. Located downtown at the corner of 4th and Brazos Streets, it had a reputation as a punk rock venue for its support of local and touring punk bands, but it also booked a wide variety of other types of music.

== Location ==
Club Foot was located in a two-story warehouse that was partially underground, on 4th St. between Brazos St. and Congress Avenue, just east of the Greyhound Bus Station. The club featured a large picture window overlooking the bus staging area, and a bar made from a Lincoln Continental that was cut in half. Today, the Frost Bank building exists on the site of both buildings.

== History ==
The structure had previously been the home of at least two other nightclubs. In 1977 it was a club called Boondock's, which featured live bands. Subsequent to that, it was a club called Crazy Bob's. The club was purchased in 1979 by David Ladd an entrepreneur involved in the real estate development business and motion pictures. It was converted into a Gay Disco called "Rushes" which opened March 17, 1979. The Grand opening several weeks later was packed with people from all over the country to see Grace Jones perform. It was huge success but as the Disco scene began to fade it became a showcase club for local bands and evolved into a punk rock venue.

Club Foot published a calendar called "Footprints" that included detailed descriptions of upcoming concerts under the slogan "all the news that's foot to print." In 1983, Club Foot was the site of the first Austin Chronicle Readers Poll Music Awards, an annual show that has become the kickoff event for the South by Southwest Music Conference (SXSW) each year.

== Notable acts ==
The headliner for the opening night at Club Foot was The Stranglers. Among those playing there during the approximately three years it was open were New Order, Uranium Savages, U2, Willie Nelson, R.E.M., James Brown, Sam and Dave, the Skunks, B. B. King, Carl Perkins, King Sunny Adé, Stevie Ray Vaughan, X, Burning Spear, Stray Cats, Dr. John, Big Boys, John Lee Hooker, Leon Russell, Ian Hunter, Joe Cocker, Iggy Pop, John Hiatt, Stanley Turrentine, Albert King, The Blasters, NRBQ, Richard Hell, Little Steven & the Disciples of Soul, Mitch Ryder, John Cale, Delbert McClinton, The Go-Go's, The Romantics, Jesse Sublett & the Secret Six, Joe Ely, Echo & the Bunnymen, Sir Douglas Quintet, Sam and Dave, John Kay and Steppenwolf, Billy Idol, The Fabulous Thunderbirds, Junior Walker, Joe King Carrasco and the Crowns, Charlie Musselwhite, UK Subs, Anti-Nowhere League, Orchestral Manoeuvres in the Dark, Big Youth, Rare Earth, The Ventures, The Lift, The Standing Waves, Patterns, Gun Club, Roky Erickson, Pete Shelley, The Nighthawks, Grace Jones, David Johansen, The Neville Brothers, Wall of Voodoo, The English Beat, Bobby "Blue" Bland, Sparks, Maria Muldaur, The Fleshtones, Rank and File, Romeo Void, The Take, The Strays, Edgar Winter, Flipper, Buddy Guy and Junior Wells, Huey Lewis and the News, Savoy Brown, Bow Wow Wow, The Plimsouls, Garland Jeffreys, Mighty Diamonds, Marianne Faithfull and T-Bone Burnett. Hosted by Wendy O. Williams and Eric Johnson, Plasmatics, Metallica, Juluka.
