= Joseph Massie =

Joseph Massie may refer to:

- Joseph Massie (American football) (1871–1922), American football player and coach
- Joseph Massie (economist) (died 1784), British political economist
- Joseph Hardin Massie, architect of Edgewood, 1858 (Amherst, Virginia)

== See also ==
- Joseph Massey (disambiguation)
