= Joseph Massey (cricketer) =

English cricketer

Personal information
- Full name: Joseph Massey
- Born: 31 January 1895; Rochdale, Lancashire, England
- Died: 9 August 1977 (aged 82); Great Eccleston, Lancashire, England
- Batting: Right-handed

Career statistics
Competition	First-class
Matches	2
Runs scored	65
Batting average	16.25
100s/50s	–/–
Top score	25
Catches/stumpings	–/–
- Source: Cricinfo, 26 September 2019

Joseph Massey (31 January 1895 – 9 August 1977) was an English first-class cricketer.

Massey was born at Rochdale in January 1895. He played club cricket before and during the First World War in the northern leagues, before playing for Littleborough and Rochdale after the war in the Central Lancashire League, where he performed well. He then moved to Blackpool, where he played for twenty seasons. He was selected to play for Sir L. Parkinson's XI in 1933, making his debut in first-class cricket for the team against the touring West Indians at Blackpool in 1933. He made a second first-class appearance for the team in 1935, against Leicestershire at Blackpool. He scored a total of 65 runs in his two first-class matches, with a high score of 25. After being employed by Leyland Motors, he became the publican at The Black Bull in Great Eccleston in 1936, where he would spend the next 41 years. Massey died there in August 1977.
