= Armadillo World Headquarters =

Bygone Texas music hall in Austin

Coordinates: 30.258°N 97.750°W

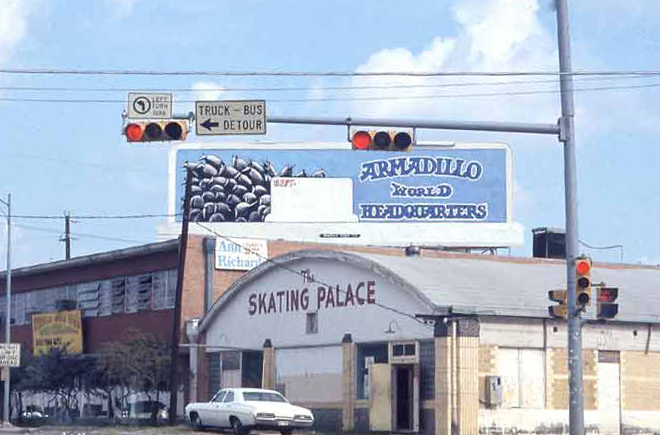
The Armadillo World Headquarters, "behind the Skating Palace", in 1976

Armadillo World Headquarters (The 'Dillo or Armadillo WHQ) was an influential Texas music hall and beer garden in Austin at 525½ Barton Springs Road – at South First Street – just south of the Colorado River and downtown Austin. The 'Dillo flourished from 1970 to 1980. The structure that housed it, an old National Guard Armory, was demolished in 1981 and replaced by a 13-story office building.

== History ==
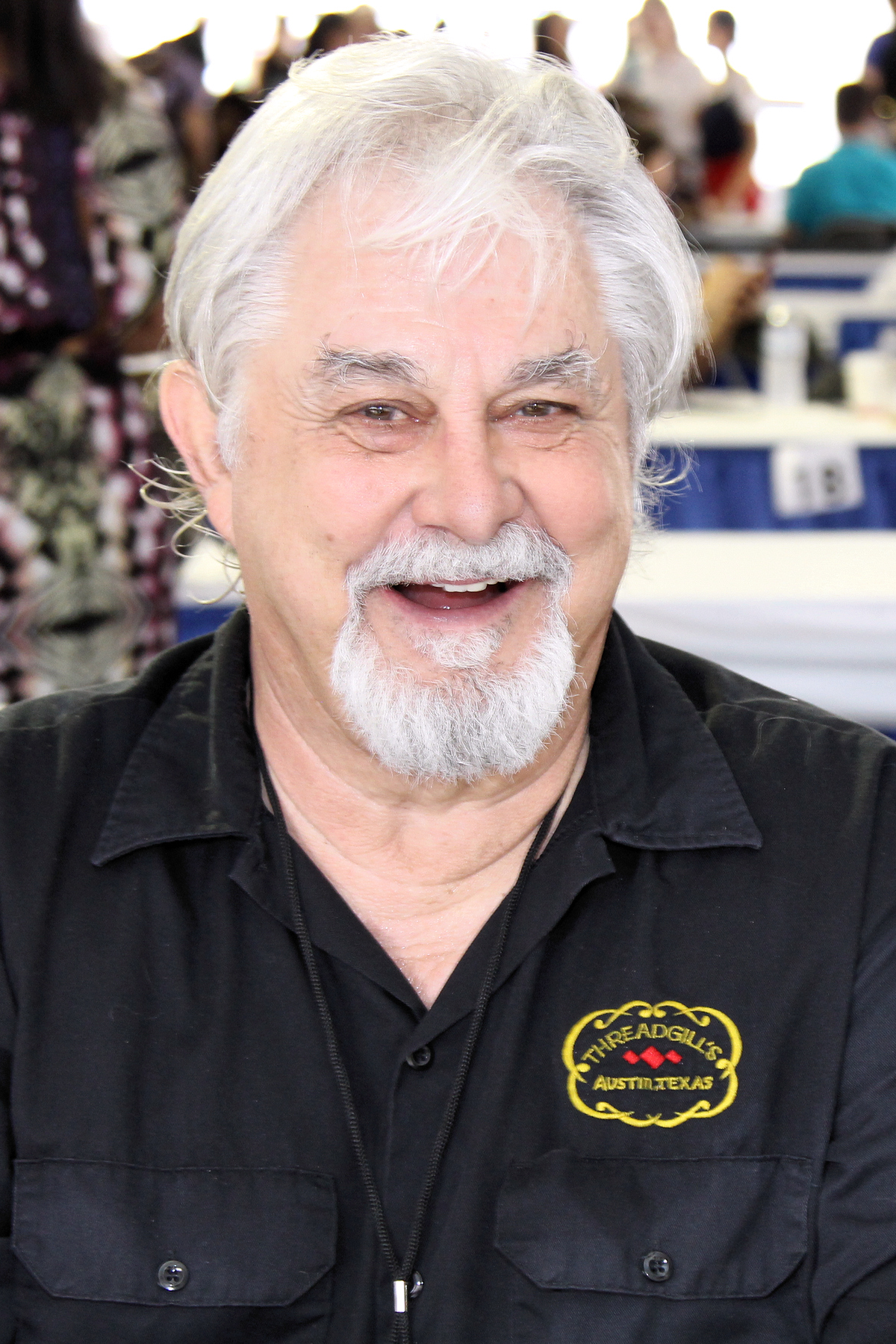
Eddie Wilson in 2017

In 1970, Austin's flagship rock music venue, the Vulcan Gas Company (1967–1970), closed, leaving the city's nascent and burgeoning live music scene without an incubator. One night, Eddie Wilson, manager of the local group Shiva's Headband, stepped outside a nightclub where the Hub City Movers were playing and noticed an old, abandoned National Guard armory. Wilson found an unlocked garage door on the building and was able to view the cavernous interior using the headlights of his automobile.

He had a desire to continue the legacy of the Vulcan Gas Company, and was inspired by what he saw in the armory to create a new music hall in the derelict structure. The armory was estimated to have been built in 1948, but no records of its construction could be or have been located. The building was ugly, uncomfortable, and had poor acoustics, but offered cheap rent and a central location. Posters for the venue usually noted the address as 525 1/2 Barton Springs Road (Rear), behind the Skating Palace.

The name for the Armadillo was inspired by the use of armadillos as a symbol in the artwork of Jim Franklin, a local poster artist, and from the building itself. In choosing the mascot for the new venture, Wilson and his partners wanted an "armored" animal since the building was an old armory. The nine-banded armadillo (Dasypus novemcinctus) was chosen because of its hard shell that looks like armor, its history as a survivor (virtually unchanged for almost 50 million years), and its near-ubiquity in Central Texas. Wilson also believed the building looked like it had been some type of headquarters at one time. He initially proposed "International Headquarters" but in the end it became "World Headquarters."

In founding the Armadillo World Headquarters, Wilson was assisted by Jim Franklin, Mike Tolleson (né Robert Michael Tolleson; born 1942), an entertainment attorney licensed by the State Bar of Texas in 1968, Bobby Hedderman from the Vulcan Gas Company and Hank Alrich. Funding for the venture was initially provided by Shiva's Headband founder's father, Dan Perskin, and Mad Dog, Inc. an Austin literati group that included Bud Shrake.

The Armadillo World Headquarters officially opened on August 7, 1970, with Shiva's Headband, the Hub City Movers, and Whistler performing.

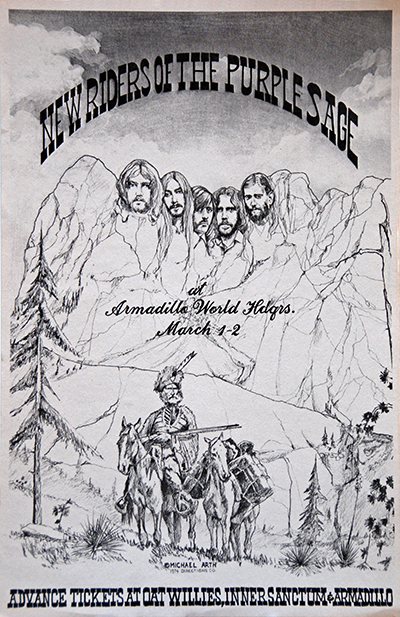
"New Riders of the Purple Sage" 1974 Armadillo World Headquarters poster, Michael Edward Arth (de), graphic artist

The Armadillo caught on quickly with the hippie culture of Austin because admission was inexpensive and the hall tolerated cannabis use. Even though illicit drug use was flagrant, the Armadillo was never raided. Anecdotes suggest the police were worried about having to bust their fellow officers as well as local and state politicians.

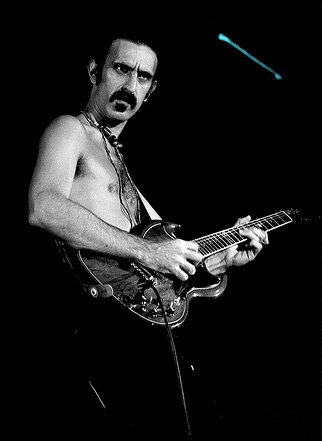
Frank Zappa at the Armadillo World Headquarters, September 13, 1977, Mark Steven Estabrook, photo

Soon, the Armadillo started receiving publicity in national magazines such as Rolling Stone. In a story from its September 9, 1974, edition, Time magazine wrote that the Armadillo was to the Austin music scene what The Fillmore had been to the emergence of rock music in the 1960s. The clientele became a mixture of hippies, cowboys, and businessmen who stopped by to have lunch and a beer and listen to live music. As Gary Nunn put it, "It's been said that our music was the catalyst that brought the shit-kickers and the hippies together at the Armadillo." At its peak, the amount of Lone Star draft beer sold by the Armadillo was second only to the Houston Astrodome. The Neiman Marcus department store even offered a line of Armadillo-branded products.

The unique blend of country and rock music performed at the hall became known as "The Austin Sound," "Redneck Rock," progressive country or "Cosmic Cowboy." Michael Martin Murphey, Jerry Jeff Walker and The Lost Gonzo Band were the pioneers of the genre. Many upcoming and established acts such as Willie Nelson, Waylon Jennings, Ray Charles, Stevie Ray Vaughan and ZZ Top played the Armadillo.

Freddy Fender, Freddie King, Frank Zappa, Commander Cody and His Lost Planet Airmen, The Sir Douglas Quintet all recorded live albums there. Bruce Springsteen played five shows during 1974. The Australian band AC/DC played their first American show at the Armadillo with Canadian band Moxy in July 1977. The Clash played live at The Armadillo with Joe Ely on October 4, 1979 (a photo from that show appears on the band's London Calling album) and the notorious Austin punk band The Skunks.

Despite its successes, the Armadillo always struggled financially. The addition of the Armadillo Beer Garden in 1972 and the subsequent establishment of food service were both bids to generate steady cash flow. The financial difficulties continued. In an interview for the 2010 book Weird City, Eddie Wilson remarked:

"People don't remember this part: the months and months of drudgery. People talk about the Armadillo like it was a huge success, but there were months where hardly anyone showed up. After the first night when no one really came I ended up crying myself to sleep up on stage."

This predicament was blamed on a combination of large guaranteed payments for the acts, cheap ticket prices, and poor promotion. The club finally had to lay off staff members in late 1976 and file for Chapter 11 bankruptcy in 1977. Another factor in the club's demise was that it sat on 5.62 acres (22,700 m^{2}) of land in what soon became a prime development area in the rapidly growing city. The Armadillo's landlord sold the property for an amount estimated between $4 million and $8 million.

The final concert at the Armadillo took place on December 31, 1980. The sold-out New Year's Eve show featured Asleep at the Wheel and Commander Cody and the Lost Planet Airmen. Some reports say the show ended at 4 am, while others claim that the bands played until dawn. The contents of the Armadillo were sold at auction in January 1981, and the old armory was razed for a high-rise office building.

== Live recordings made at the Armadillo ==
=== Progressive country, rock, blues, punk ===
1. Commander Cody and His Lost Planet Airmen: Sleazy Roadside Stories
  - Recorded December 1973, released in 1988; OCLC 52943579
2. Commander Cody and His Lost Planet Airmen: Live from Deep in the Heart of Texas (1974); OCLC 872055098
3. Frank Zappa, Captain Beefheart, The Mothers: Bongo Fury (1975)
  - Frank Zappa (lead guitar, vocals); George Duke (keyboards); Captain Beefheart (harmonica, vocals, shoppy bags); Bruce Fowler (trombone); Tom Fowler (bass); Denny Walley (guitar, vocals); Terry Bozzio (drums)
  - Recorded May 20 & 21, 1975; "200 Years Old" and "Muffin Man" intros were recorded in January and February 1974 at the Record Plant, Los Angeles; OCLC 743162154, 800122561
  - Back-side of the album cover: "Special thanks to the kitchen staff at The Armadillo, especially Jan Beeman" (née Janelle Gay Hopper; 1934–2007)
4. New Riders of the Purple Sage: Armadillo World Headquarters, Austin, TX, 6/13/75 (1975)
5. Sir Douglas Quintet, Freddy Fender, Roky Erickson: Re-Union of the Cosmic Brothers (1975)
6. Waylon Jennings: Waylon:Live (1976)
7. Sir Douglas Quintet: Live Love (1977)
8. Doug Sahm, Augie Meyers & Friends: Wanted: Dead or Alive (1977)
9. The Bugs Henderson Group: At Last – Recorded Live on Stage (1978)
10. The Cobras: Live & Deadly
  - Cobras: Denny Freeman (guitar), Larry Lange (bass), Rodney Craig (drums), Joe Sublett (né Joseph M. Sublett; born 1953) (saxophone), Paul J. Constantine (born 1950) (trumpet), Larry Medlow "Junior Medlow" Williams Jr. (1953–1997) (vocals, rhythm guitar), also with Angela Strehli & Paul Ray (né Paul Henry Ray; 1942–2016) (vocals)
  - Recorded November 1979, released in 2011; OCLC 904409936

=== Jazz ===
1. Freddie King; with David "Fathead" Newman and Jerry Jumonville: Larger Than Life (some tracks, not full record)
  - Freddie King (vocals, guitar); John Thomas, Darrell Leonard (trumpets); Jerry Jumonville (tenor and alto sax); David "Fathead" Newman (tenor sax); Jim Gordon (né James Wells Gordon) (tenor sax, organ); Joe Davis (né Joe Lane Davis; 1941–1995) (bari sax); Alvin Hemphill (organ); K.O. Thomas, Louis Stephens (piano); Michael O'Neill and Andrew "Jr. Boy" Jones (guitar); Robert G. Wilson (1956–2010), Bennie Turner (bass guitar); Charles Myers, Big John E. Thomassie (1949–1996) (drums); Sam Clayton (congas)
  - Recorded April 1975; RSO SO-4811
2. Carla Bley
  - Mike Mantler (trumpet); Gary Windo (sax); Alan Michael Braufman (saxophone); John Clark (French horn); George E. Lewis (trombone); Bob Stewart (tuba); Blue Gene Tyranny (keyboards); Patty Price (bass); Phillip Wilson (drums)
  - Recorded March 27, 1978; Hi Hat HHHCD3112
3. Phil Woods Quartet – 2 releases: Live (1978) and More Live
  - Mike Melillo (piano); Steve Gilmore (bass); Bill Goodwin (drums)
  - Recorded May 23 & 26, 1978; Aledphi AD5010; OCLC 9617686, 153920622, 763120503, 1187400833, 35266949, 725169019, 611560736
4. Anthony Braxton (solo alto sax) (1978)
  - Recorded October, 1978; released March 2011, Braxton Bootleg Records BL007 (Note: Braxton Bootleg Records is a project of the Tri-Centric Foundation, a Connecticut non-profit organization that supports the work and legacy of American composer and musician Anthony Braxton. (Tri-Centric website))

== Selected people ==
=== Music poster artists (alphabetical) ===
Posters by the following artists were part of the iconic artwork that helped define Armadillo World Headquarters in the 1970s – "The Armadillo Art Squad:"

- Michael Edward Arth (de) (born 1953)
- Kerry Awn
- Ken Featherston (né Kenneth Wayne Featherston; 1951–1975)
- Jim Franklin (born 1943) drew his first armadillo – smoking a joint – on a hand-bill for a 1968 love-in. Twenty-seven years later, in 1995, Texas designated the nine-banded armadillo (Dasypus novemcinctus) as the official state small mammal. Franklin has been called the "Michelangelo of armadillo art."
- Danny Garrett
- Henry Gonzalez (né Enrique Barrientos Gonzalez; 1950–2016)
- Guy Juke
- Bill Narum (né William Albert Narum; 1947–2009)
- Micael Priest (1951–2018)
- Dale Wilkins (né Dale Evan Wilkins; born 1949)
- Sam Yeates (né Samuel Wade Yeates; born 1951)

=== Photographer ===
Vermont-born Burton Wilson (né Burton Estey Wilson; 1919–2014) – no relation to Eddie – was the de facto house photographer for the Vulcan Gas Company and Armadillo World Headquarters. Eddie Wilson once told him, "Just tell anybody who asks that you own the place. That way, you'll never need a backstage pass."

== Legacy ==
=== Historical marker ===
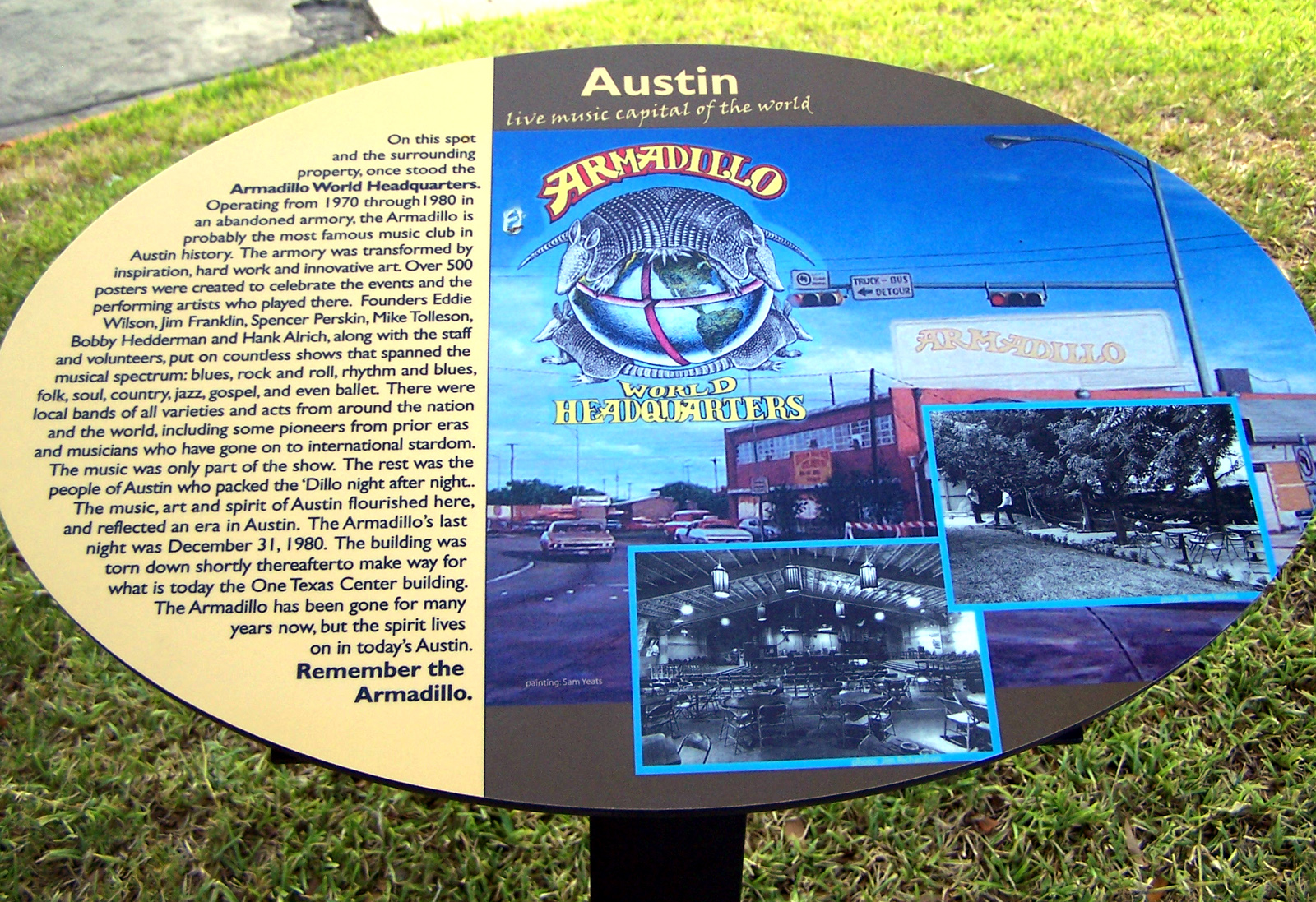
The commemorative plaque at the site where the Armadillo once stood Center illustration: Jim Franklin, 1970 (Note: An inscription on the historical marker credits Sam Yeats [sic] for the illustration included in the collage, but earlier prints show the initials "JFKLN", the signature of Jim Franklin.)

On August 19, 2006, the City of Austin dedicated a commemorative historical plaque that had been installed in the parking lot of One Texas Center, where the Armadillo once stood. The Texas Monthly, in its 1999 "Best of the Texas Century" edition, named Armadillo World Headquarters as the "Venue of the Century."

It is still on the lips and minds of a lot of people 26 years after it closed. This is noteworthy for me because of the zero-tolerance mentality, and now the city erected a memorial that glorifies the things of the past that are not accepted today.

— Eddie Wilson, August 19, 2006

In 2024 the local soccer club, Austin FC, struck a deal with Eddie Wilson, the keeper of the Armadillo World Headquarters flame. They added an armadillo jocktag to the team's uniform, Austin FC President Andy Loughnane said it was important to pay homage to Austin's "creative and vibrant spirit". The relaunch of the Armadillo was celebrated at the Austin FC jersey launch party, with Asleep at the Wheel frontman, Ray Benson.

=== Documentary ===
In 2026 Deadline reported Woody Harrelson is producing a feature length documentary about the Armadillo World Headquarters. It will chronicle the rise and cultural impact of the music venue.

== See also ==
- Folk Music Club
- Music of Austin
