= Steven Fromholz =

American poet and singer-songwriter (1945–2014)

Steven John Fromholz
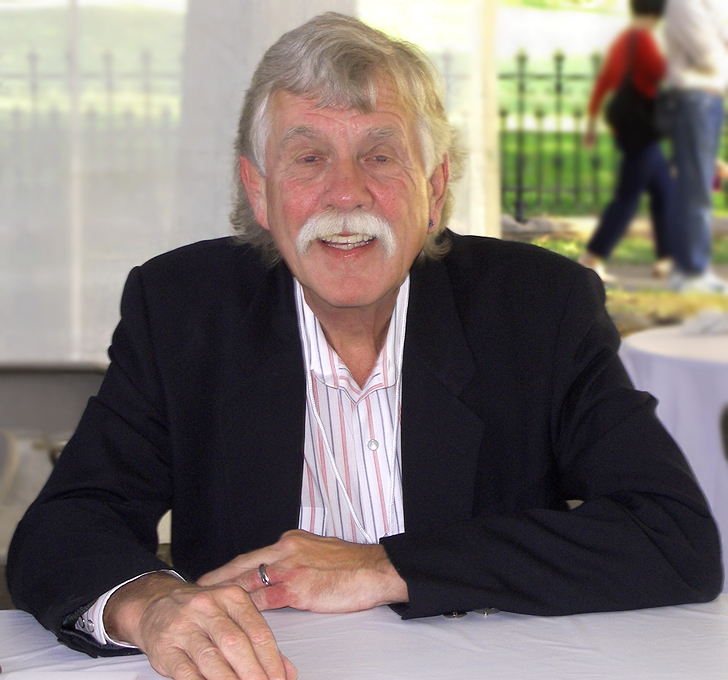
- Steven Fromholz at the 2007 Texas Book Festival.

Background information
- Born: June 8, 1945; Temple, Texas, United States
- Died: January 19, 2014 (aged 68) Eldorado, Texas, United States
- Genres: Texas country, outlaw country
- Occupations: Singer, songwriter, record producer, actor, poet
- Years active: 1960–2013
- Formerly of: Stephen Stills, Rick Roberts, Lyle Lovett, Willie Nelson

Steven John Fromholz (June 8, 1945 – January 19, 2014) was an American singer-songwriter who was selected as the Poet Laureate of Texas for 2007.

== Biography ==
Steven Fromholz was born in Temple, Texas, United States, and graduated from high school in Denton, Texas in 1963. That same year, he began at North Texas State College where he was president of the Folk Music Club. He served in the United States Navy in California from 1963 to 1968 and began performing during this time. After leaving the navy, he teamed with Dan McCrimmon to create the group Frummox. Fromholz also played with Stephen Stills and Rick Roberts before going solo. Willie Nelson recorded Fromholz's "I'd Have to be Crazy" (it reached number 11 on Billboard's Hot Country Singles chart and Fromholz sang harmony) and Lyle Lovett covered "Texas Trilogy" and "Bears." Other artists who have recorded his songs include Hoyt Axton, John Denver, Jerry Jeff Walker, and Sturgill Simpson.

In addition to singing and songwriting, Fromholz dabbled in acting, playwriting, poetry, record producing, narrating, jingle-writing and whitewater river guiding. In 2007, he was named Poet Laureate of the State of Texas by the Texas State Legislature. His latest book is Steven Fromholz: New and Selected Works.

He had two daughters; Darcie (to whom the song "Dear Darcie" is dedicated) and Felicity (for whom his record label Felicity Records is named). His life and works are the subject of an Austin Sayre documentary film currently in production titled "The Man with the Big Hat."

== Here to There ==
Fromholz's first album, Here to There, has become a difficult-to-find Texas classic, as it has long been out of print.

It was recorded with music partner Dan McCrimmon as the duo "Frummox" in 1969 on ABC Probe Records, CPLP 4511. This album is a seminal work, pre-dating and foreshadowing the Texas Music scene-to-come, when Willie Nelson relocated from Nashville to Austin and became the icon of "Outlaw" music. This album has never been officially released on CD. In 2026, it become available for digial streaming and purchase. Notable on the album is his "Texas Trilogy," a set of three songs meant to be played as one long work: "Daybreak," "Trainride," and "Bosque County Romance," portraying life in rural Texas in the 1950s, set in the town of Kopperl, in Bosque County, Texas.

Track list (time):

1. "Man With The Big Hat" (6:00)
2. "Kansas Legend" (2:43)
3. "Song For Stephen Stills (High Country Caravan)" (3:57)
4. "Jake's Song" (3:23)
5. "Texas Trilogy: a) Daybreak" (3:18)
6. "Texas Trilogy: b) Trainride" (2:21)
7. "Texas Trilogy: c) Bosque County Romance & Daybreak (reprise)" (4:38)
8. "There You Go" (2:45)
9. "Weaving Is The Property Of Few These Days" (3:36)
10. "Lovin' Mind" (2:40")

== Texas Trilogy ==
Fromholz's "Texas Trilogy" was the basis of a book by Craig D. Hillis and Bruce F. Jordan, Texas Trilogy: Life in a Small Texas Town, in which the authors accompanied and illustrated the trilogy's lyrics, set in the town of Kopperl, Texas, with photographs of the surrounding landscape. It also contains interviews with principal characters within the town. The book was praised for its photographs, though not for its text.

In addition, Fromholz himself published a book called Texas Trilogy.

== Death ==
In the early afternoon of January 19, 2014, Fromholz was fatally injured when a rifle fell from its case and discharged. He died en route to the hospital. The accident occurred as Fromholz was making preparations to hunt feral hogs who were killing the baby goats on a ranch near his residence outside Eldorado, Texas. He is buried in the nearby Fort McKavett Cemetery.

== The Man with the Big Hat ==
In 2019, efforts began toward the making of a documentary film about the life and works of Fromholz, titled The Man with the Big Hat, the name of one of his most popular songs. The film was directed by Austin Sayre, and produced by Three Chords And The Truth, alongside Brian Easley and Stephanie Moore. The documentary was shot over several years in multiple states, with cinematography by Aaron Colussi and David Broad, sound by Miles Blunt, and editing by Nevie Owens. The Man with the Big Hat features interviews with Lyle Lovett, Darcie and Felicity Fromholz, Ray Benson, Janey Lake, Darden Smith, Bobbie Bridger, Jimmie Dale Gilmore, and others. The Man with the Big Hat will premiere in 2025.

== Discography ==
- Here To There, 1969
- A Rumor In My Own Time, 1976
- Frolicking In The Myth, 1977
- Jus' Playin' Along, 1978
- Fromholz Live!, 1979
- Frummox II, 1982
- The Old Fart In The Mirror, 1995
- A Guest In Your Heart, 2000
- Live At Anderson Fair, 2001
- Cow Jazz, 2003
