= Joseph Massey (poet) =

American poet

Joseph Massey (born 1978) is an American poet. His work has been published in several widely reviewed books and numerous chapbooks. He has been associated with the New Sincerity movement. In 2022 he founded The Exile Press to publish his work.

== Biography ==
Massey began writing poetry during a six-month suspension as a sixth-grade student in Wilmington, Delaware, whereupon he discovered Jim Morrison, Arthur Rimbaud, and Friedrich Nietzsche. He divided his time between divorced parents in Wilmington and Linwood, Pennsylvania, in families he characterized as abusive. At the age of 15, he sent handwritten poems to Allen Ginsberg, who replied with encouragement. Massey dropped out of school in ninth grade. At 19, Massey wrote to the poet Cid Corman. They continued a correspondence that lasted until Corman died in 2004.

Massey was confirmed in the Catholic Church in 2021. He currently lives near Saratoga Springs, New York.

== Career ==
Massey's collection To Keep Time appeared as an Omnidawn title in 2014. SF Weekly said that the "collection of fierce minimalistic observations contains a cascading effect, where the velocity of the word-sounds build anticipation yet stall with a density of ideas." Barbara Hoffert, reviewing the title for Library Journal, wrote, "In distilled, acutely observed poems, Massey builds the world out of light and shadow.... You can't call this nature poetry, but it's a beautiful rendition of what's breathable."

In 2015, Massey published Illocality with Wave Books. Stephen Burt, reviewing it for The New York Times, wrote that "His stanzas, like spies’ microdots, astonish not least because they pack so much information into so little space." The book was also reviewed by David Wheatley for The Times Literary Supplement, Ann Van Buren for The Rumpus, and Publishers Weekly.

In 2018, Rebekah Kirkman reported on Massey's history of abusive behavior for The Outline. It drew from private testimony and a letter published anonymously on WordPress alleging “severe name-calling, bullying, and unrelenting verbal abuse; blaming victims for symptoms of what he considers his mental illness(es) and using depression/anxiety as an excuse for predation; alienating and gaslighting victims; and threatening to harm victims’ public and personal reputations.” Massey admitted to some but not all of the allegations to Kirkman. He described a personal history as an adult of alcoholism, mental illness, and poor behavior, as well as a childhood in which family members subjected him to physical, psychological, and sexual abuse. As a result of the 2018 allegations, Massey withdrew a book that Wesleyan University Press had intended to publish.

Massey later recounted that as a result of the reporting in The Outline, an "online mob... harassed my publishers, demanding that they stop selling my books. They harassed a soon-to-be publisher, demanding they drop my book and break our contract. They sent letters and emails to a university I worked for part-time, demanding they fire me. They contacted friends of mine, demanding they publicly denounce me." Massey subsequently became a subject of discussion concerning cancel culture and moralizing in the arts.

In 2023, Massey told book blogger Fiona Dodwell that he had founded The Exile Press to publish his work. Massey published Rosary Made of Air (2022) and later books as titles of The Exile Press.

In 2025, Massey appeared on The Megan Kelly Show. He recounted how the attempted assassination of Donald Trump in Pennsylvania caused him to change his mind about the president and write America is the Poem, which he published in book form in 2025. Peter Savodnik, writing for The Free Press, dubbed Massey "the Unofficial Poet Laureate of Trump’s America." Massey told Savodnik, "Poetry is not advertising. It’s not cultural discourse. It’s an elevated form of speech, and online speech is a degraded kind of language. Social media really facilitates that degradation. My hope is that, through language, people will have some of their own dignity restored by reading work that is not politicizing everything."

== Bibliography ==
=== Books ===
- Areas of Fog. Shearsman Books. 2009. ISBN 978-1-84861-052-1.
- At the Point. Shearsman Books. 2011. ISBN 978-1-84861-166-5.
- To Keep Time. Omnidawn Publishing. 2014. ISBN 978-1-890650-97-1.
- Illocality (Wave Books, 2015; Hollyridge Press, 2018)
- A New Silence. Shearsman Books. 2019. ISBN 978-1-84861-671-4.
- Rosary Made of Air (The Exile Press, 2022)
- The Light of No Other Hour. The Exile Press. 2023. ISBN 979-8-3925-9083-4.
- Decades: Selected Poems (The Exile Press, 2024)
- America Is the Poem (The Exile Press, 2025)
- Invisible Current (The Exile Press, 2026)

=== Selected chapbooks ===
- Massey, Joseph (2010). Exit North. Book Thug. ISBN 978-1-897388-62-4.
- What Follows. Ornithopter Press. 2015. ISBN 978-1-942723-00-4.
- Present Conditions. Hollyridge Press Chapbook Series. Hollyridge Press. 2018. ISBN 978-1-7325133-0-3.
- Five Poems. Tungsten Press. 2018.
