= Nels Hagerup =

Norwegian-born American painter

- Born: 1864; Christiania, Norway
- Died: March 13, 1922 (aged 57–58); San Francisco, California, U.S.
- Occupation: Painter
- Spouse: Harriet Marie Hageman

Nels Hagerup (1864 – March 13, 1922) was a Norwegian-born American painter. He emigrated to the United States in 1882. He lived in Portland until 1892, when he relocated to San Francisco. He was married Harriet Marie Hageman Hagerup (1851-1918).

Over the course of his career, he did over 6,000 paintings, and he "won gold medals at the Portland and Seattle fairs."

== Other sources ==
- Edan Milton Hughes (1989) Artists in California, 1786-1940 (Hughes Pub Co) ISBN 978-0961611217
