= Jon Dee Graham =

American musician, guitarist and songwriter (1959–2026)

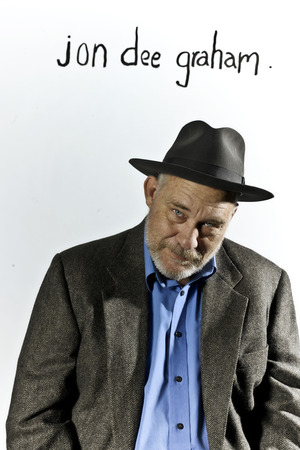

Background information
- Born: February 28, 1959
- Origin: Austin, Texas, U.S.
- Died: March 27, 2026 (aged 67)
- Occupations: Guitarist, songwriter
- Instrument: Guitar
- Years active: 1986–2026
- Label: Freedom Records

Jon Dee Graham (February 28, 1959 – March 27, 2026) was an American musician, guitarist and songwriter from Austin, Texas. He was named the Austin Musician of the Year during the South by Southwest (SXSW) music conference in 2006. He was inducted into the Austin Music Hall of Fame three times: as a solo artist in 2000, again in 2008 as a member of The Skunks, and again in 2009 as a member of the True Believers.

The Skunks formed in 1978, with a lineup featuring Jesse Sublett on bass and vocals and Bill Blackmon on drums. Graham joined as their new guitarist (replacing Eddie Munoz, who departed to join The Plimsouls) in 1979. Graham's guitar can be heard on the band's live CD, Live: Earthquake Shake, released in 2000.

The True Believers, which included Alejandro Escovedo and his brother, Javier Escovedo, are widely considered by critics to be seminal figures in the fusion of literary songwriting and punk rock, a sound often referred to as cowpunk, a subset of alternative country.

Graham went on to play with John Doe, Exene Cervenka, James McMurtry, Eliza Gilkyson, Kelly Willis, John Hiatt, Michelle Shocked, Patty Griffin, Calvin Russell, and Lone Justice.

His music has been featured in soundtracks such as Ladder 49 and Veronica Mars. In 1992, Patty Smyth covered Graham's song "One Moment to Another" on her album Patty Smyth.

== Career ==
Graham released ten solo albums: Escape from Monster Island (1997, Freedom Records), Summerland (1999, New West Records), Hooray for the Moon (2002, New West Records), The Great Battle (2004, New West Records), Full (2006, Freedom Records), Swept Away (Film Soundtrack) (2008, Freedom Records), It's Not As Bad As It Looks (2010, Freedom Records), Garage Sale (2012, Freedom Records), Do Not Forget (2015, Freedom Records), and Knoxville Skyline (2016, South Central). His 2004 record, The Great Battle, was produced by Austin guitarist Charlie Sexton, a longtime member of Bob Dylan's band.

His music generally explores the struggles adults face as they work to raise their children, maintain marriages and jobs, and grapple with the quick passage of time. Despite the heaviness of such themes, Graham's music is infused with a strong sense of the joys of life and the need to remain optimistic.

Graham's second son, Willie, suffered from a chronic, rare childhood disease called Legg-Perthes. In 2005, the Austin music community banded together in an effort to raise money for Willie's treatment. The resulting benefit concert at Austin's Continental Club became a CD/DVD release called Big Sweet Life: The Songs of Jon Dee Graham. Musicians like Alejandro Escovedo, Bob Schneider, David Garza, Ray Wylie Hubbard, Ian McLagan, and Steve Poltz contributed by covering Graham's tunes. An additional benefit concert, held the same night at the Saxon Pub, featured performances by Roky Erickson and the Skunks. Graham commuted the short distance between clubs to participate in both shows.

Over the years, Graham has been backed by Jim Keltner, Rafael Gayol, Mark Andes, Michael Hardwick, and Andrew Duplantis, who went on to play in Son Volt with Jay Farrar.

In early 2006, production began on a feature-length documentary on Graham and his music. Entitled Jon Dee Graham: Swept Away, it was released on DVD on May 20, 2008 and later made available to stream on Amazon Prime. The film was directed by a friend of Graham's, Mark Finkelpearl, a documentary television professional with a background on the staffs of the Discovery Channel and National Geographic Television.

In August 2008, Graham underwent emergency surgery after being injured in a one-car accident.

In 2012, Susan Cowsill, Freedy Johnston, and Graham, working together as The Hobart Brothers and Lil' Sis Hobart, released a collaborative album on Freedom Records entitled At Least We Have Each Other.

Dreamer: A Tribute to Kent Finlay, released in early 2016 on Austin-based Eight 30 Records, features Graham's version of Finlay's "Taken Better Care of Myself". That year Graham performed at FitzGerald's American Music Festival.

In 2019, Graham announced plans and launched a fan-funding campaign to record a new album in conjunction with his 60th birthday.

== Death ==
Graham died on March 27, 2026, at the age of 67.

== Discography ==
=== Albums ===
- Escape From Monster Island – 1997 (Freedom)
- Summerland – 1999 (New West)
- Hooray For The Moon – 2002 (New West)
- The Great Battle – 2004 (New West)
- First Bear On The Moon – 2005 (Freedom)
- Big Sweet Life: The Songs of Jon Dee Graham – 2005 (Freedom)
- FULL – 2006 (Freedom)
- Swept Away (Music from the documentary film by Mark Finkelpearl) – 2008 (Freedom)
- It's Not As Bad As It Looks – 2010 (Freedom)
- At Least We Have Each Other - The Hobart Brothers with Lil' Sis – 2012 (Freedom)
- Garage Sale – 2012 (Freedom)
- Do Not Forget – 2015 (Freedom)
- Knoxville Skyline – 2016 (South Central Music)
- Only Dead For A Little While – 2023 (Strolling Bones)

=== Guitar, producer, vocals ===
- 1986: "Blue City", Ry Cooder, Guitar
- 1986: "True Believers", True Believers, Guitar, Guitar (Steel), Vocals
- 1990: "Meet John Doe", John Doe, Guitar
- 1990: "Running Sacred", Exene Cervenka, Guitar (Electric)
- 1992: "Edge of the Valley", Terry Garland Guitar (Acoustic), Bass, Guitar, Arranger, Guitar (Electric), Guitar (Steel), Tambourine, Lap Steel Guitar
- 1992: Forever Simon Bonney Dobro, Lap Steel Guitar, Bottleneck Guitar
- 1993: 13 Ribs Susan Voelz Bass, Guitar, Vocals (background)
- 1993: Hasta La Victoria! The Silos
- 1994: Adequate Desire Michael Hall Lap Steel Guitar
- 1994: "Hard Road", The True Believers, Guitar, Guitar (Steel), Vocals
- 1994: Susan Across the Ocean The Silos Lap Steel Guitar
- 1995: Can O' Worms Dan Stuart Guitar, Vocals, Lap Steel Guitar
- 1997: Anchorless Kacy Crowley Guitar (Electric)
- 1997: Dream of the Dog Calvin Russell Guitar, Arranger, Producer, Lap Steel Guitar
- 1997: Glad I'm a Girl Various Artists Bass, Guitar, Vocals (background)
- 1997: Too Much Is Not Enough Too Much TV Slide Guitar
- 1997: Way Things Are Polk, Barton and Towhead Lap Steel Guitar
- 1998: "One Possible Explanation" Roberto Moreno, Wicked Lead Guitar, Lap Steel, Vocals
- 1998: Anchorless [Bonus Track] Kacy Crowley Guitar (Electric)
- 1998: Crooked Mile Trish Murphy Guitar (Acoustic), Guitar (Electric), Multi Instruments, Lap Steel Guitar, Guitar (Baritone)
- 1998: Gogitchyershinebox The Gourds, Guitar
- 1998: Plebeians The Plebeians Guitar, Lap Steel Guitar
- 1998: Stadium Blitzer The Gourds Lap Steel Guitar
- 1998: This Is My Life Calvin Russell Guitar
- 1998: Uprooted: The Best of Roots Country Singer/Songwriter Various Artists Guitar (Acoustic), Guitar, Guitar (Electric), Lap Steel Guitar
- 1998: We All Fall Down Gerald Bair Guitar (Electric)
- 1999: What I Deserve Kelly Willis, Guitar (Electric), Lap Steel Guitar
- 2000: And All The Colors... Ian Moore Lap Steel Guitar
- 2000: Bolsa de Agua The Gourds, Lap Steel Guitar
- 2000: Lunette Jim Roll Guitar, Lap Steel Guitar
- 2000: Young Guitar Slingers: Texas Blues Evolution Various Artists Lap Steel Guitar
- 2001: "Attacks" Roberto Moreno, Lap Steel
- 2001: Earthquake Shake Skunks Guitar
- 2001: Midnight Pumpkin Toni Price Lap Steel Guitar
- 2001: Slinky Presents Superclub DJ's Guy Ornadel Producer
- 2002: Buttermilk & Rifles Kevin Russell's Junker Lap Steel Guitar
- 2002: Electric Jack Ingram Guitar (Acoustic), Guitar, Guitar (Electric)
- 2002: Everybody Loves a Winner Jeff Klein Guitar (Electric), Choir, Chorus
- 2002: From Hell to Breakfast: A Taste of Sugar Hill's Te Various Artists Lap Steel Guitar
- 2003: Growl Ray Wylie Hubbard Vocals, Lap Steel Guitar
- 2003: Patricia Vonne [Bandolera] Patricia Vonne Lap Steel Guitar
- 2004: Boogie Man Omar & The Howlers Guitar
- 2004: Land of Milk and Honey Eliza Gilkyson Guitar (Electric), Harmony Vocals
- 2004: Moodswing Kacy Crowley Guitar, Producer, Mixing, Mando-Guitar
- 2004: "Por Vida: A Tribute to the Songs of Alejandro Escovedo", Various Artists, Guitar, Vocals
- 2004: "Resentments", The Resentments Guitar (Acoustic), Dobro, Guitar (Electric), Vocals, Organ (Pump), Lap Steel Guitar, Group Member
- 2005: Guitars & Castanets Patricia Vonne Lap Steel Guitar
- 2006: Big Star Small World Various Artists Guitar, Lap Steel Guitar
- 2006: "Boxing Mirror", Alejandro Escovedo, Guitar
- 2006: Tales from the Tavern, Vol. 1
- 2009: Live In Europe CD and DVD (James McMurtry), Guitar on Laredo

== See also ==
- Music of Austin
