= Jim Franklin (artist) =

American cartoonist

- Jim Franklin (holding megaphone) backstage at the Ritz Theatre 1975
- Born: James Knox Franklin, Jr. 1943 (age 82–83); Galveston, Texas, U.S.
- Education: San Francisco Art Institute.
- Known for: Painting, illustration, Comix
- Notable work: Armadillo World Headquarters poster art

Jim Franklin (born December 28, 1943 in Galveston, Texas) is an artist, illustrator, and underground cartoonist best known for his poster art created for the Armadillo World Headquarters, a former Austin, Texas, music hall. He is also known for his detailed, surrealistic illustrations of armadillos, making them an emblem of underground music.

== Career ==
Franklin studied at the San Francisco Art Institute. Returning to Texas, he teamed with musicians and artists to open a psychedelic music hall in Austin, called the Vulcan Gas Company. Franklin lived in the club and was its primary poster artist for bands such as Shiva's Headband, 13th Floor Elevators, Conqueroo, and Canned Heat. At the Vulcan, Franklin and Gilbert Shelton worked together for the first time.

Franklin began drawing armadillos in 1968 and they became a symbol of the hippie counterculture movement in Texas. He used this armadillo motif when creating the album art for Shiva's Headband's first record, Take Me to the Mountains and poster art for the Armadillo World Headquarters. Commander Cody and His Lost Planet Airmen's live recording, Live from Deep in the Heart of Texas, features Franklin's armadillo art, as do the Freddie King albums, Texas Cannonball and Woman Across the River.

Franklin's surrealistic armadillos and other art often appeared on the cover of Austin's underground newspaper, The Rag. According to Robert Lemmo, Franklin "catapulted to countercultural fame when his obsessively detailed and surrealistic armadillos began to fill the pages of an underground weekly called The Rag. The armadillo became a folk hero the likes of which hadn't been seen in Texas since Davy Crockett days."

Franklin also wrote Underground comix and created Armadillo Comics. Franklin's armadillo paintings earned him the nickname, the "Michelangelo of armadillo art". In 1971, The New Yorker ran a feature story on Franklin and his work, entitled "Armadillo Man". A portion of Les Blank's long-unreleased 1974 documentary, A Poem Is A Naked Person, depicts Franklin's creation of a mural in Leon Russell's empty swimming pool.

Many of Franklin's paintings and posters are signed with the initials JFKLN. He continues to paint and is often seen on opening nights at the South Austin Museum of Popular Culture.

A celebration of Jim Franklin's 80th birthday, including entertainment by Floyd Domino's All Stars and Shawn Sahm & Friends, was held on December 30th, 2023 at the south Austin venue, Sagebrush. Funds raised at the event benefited Austin Museum of Popular Culture

== See also ==
- Music of Austin
