= Edwin Osbourne Wilson =

American concert promoter

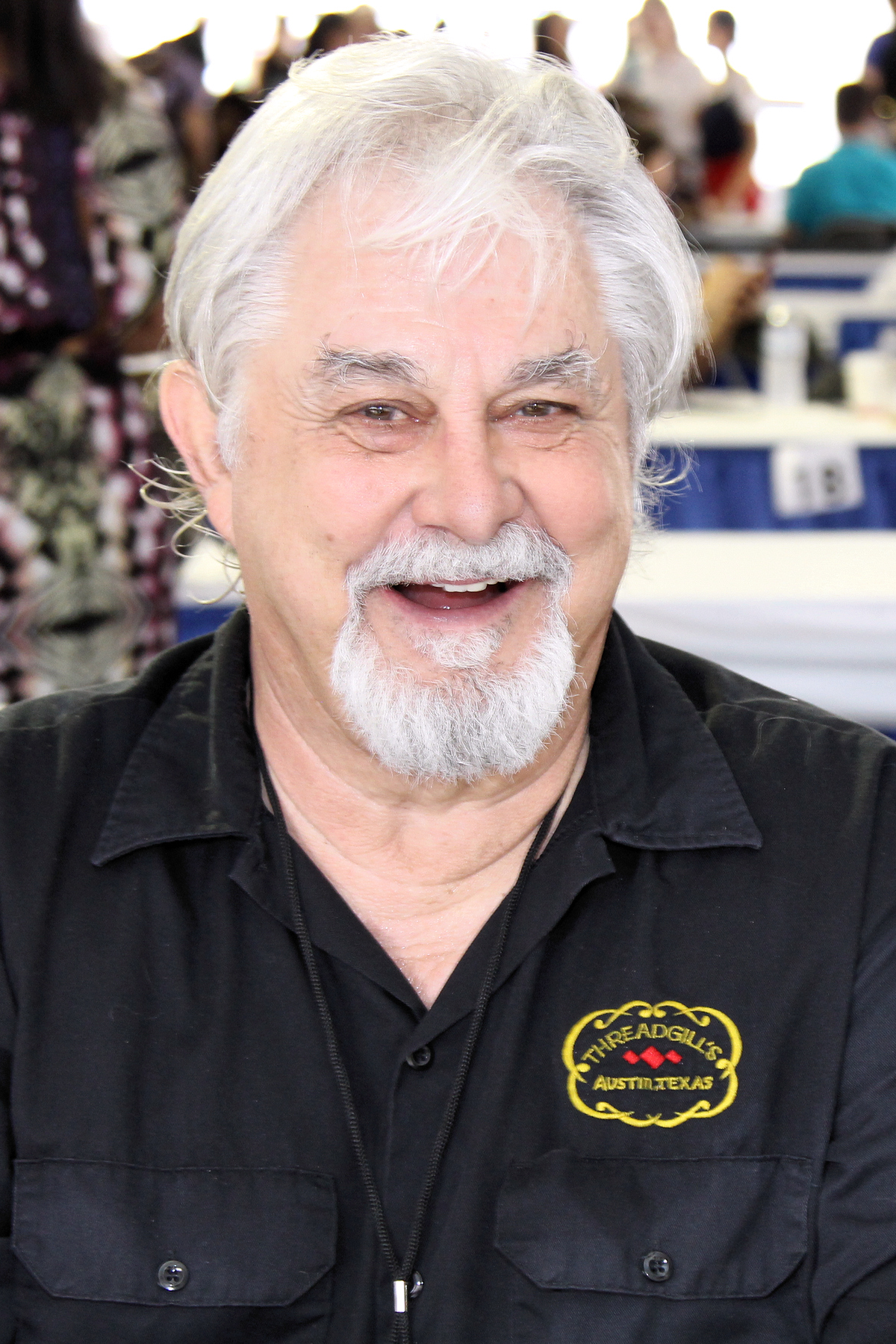
Wilson at the 2017 Texas Book Festival

Edwin Osbourne Wilson is a former concert promoter and co-founder and owner of the Armadillo World Headquarters (1973–1980). The music venue led a music movement in Austin to national prominence from 1973 to 1980 as the birthplace of Texas progressive country, aka "redneck rock" – a fusion of country music and rock – later, more blues than rock. It was a popular venue for Willie Nelson. Wilson is the owner of two Threadgill's restaurants in Austin. The original, which he purchased in the mid-1970s from John Kenneth Threadgill (1909–1987), was where Janis Joplin got her start.

== Growing up ==
Wilson graduated from McCallum High School, Austin, Texas, in the spring of 1963. In the fall of 1963, he enrolled at the University of North Texas in Denton. At North Texas, he joined the school's Folk Music Club, whose student members included Spencer Perskin, Steven Fromholz, Ray Wylie Hubbard, and Michael Martin Murphey. The Folk Music Club was founded and sponsored by Stan Alexander (né Stanley Gerald Alexander; 1928–2017), an English professor who had been influenced by the music scene at Threadgill's in Austin while working on his doctorate at The University of Texas.

== Bibliography ==
- Threadgill's: The Cookbook, by Edwin O. Wilson, Longstreet Press (1996) & Eakin Press (2002); ISBN 1571686924
- Armadillo World Headquarters: A Memoir, by Eddie Wilson and Jesse Sublett, TSSI Publishing (publisher) and University of Texas Press (distributor) (2017); ISBN 978-1-4773-1382-4
