= Shiva's Headband =

American country band

Shiva's Headband (or Shiva's Head Band), was an American psychedelic country band, formed in Austin, Texas, United States, in 1967. Original members included fiddler Spencer Perskin and his wife Susan, keyboardist Shawn Siegel, guitarists Kenny Parker and Bob Tom Reed and drummer Jerry Barnett. The group was the house band at the Vulcan Gas Company, a late 1960s Austin nightclub. The band is credited with a significant role in the founding of the Armadillo World Headquarters. The band's first royalty check opened the club and hired Eddie Wilson as manager. Shiva's Headband was also the first band to perform there. Throughout the 1960s and early 1970s, the band played with touring acts such as Spirit, Steppenwolf, ZZ Top, Janis Joplin, Canned Heat and Steve Miller. Austin psychedelic bands contemporary to Shiva's Headband included The 13th Floor Elevators and The Conqueroo.

Shiva's Headband's Capitol Records debut album, Take Me To The Mountains, produced by bandleader Spencer Perskin with Fred Catero, became the first record released nationally by an Austin-based rock band. The album cover featured artwork by Jim Franklin. In 1973, the band had an onscreen performance in the film, The Thief Who Came to Dinner, a Houston-based production that starred Ryan O'Neal and Jacqueline Bisset.

In 1999, long-time bandleader Spencer Perskin was voted " Austin's Old hippie” at Eeyore's Birthday Party, an annual Austin rite of spring. In 2005, Perkins released the recording, Magic Feather, again with artwork by Jim Franklin. The band still performs in Austin, using the name Shiva's Headband Experience.

== Select discography ==
=== Singles ===
- "Kaleidoscoptic" / "There's No Tears", Sonobeat Records, 1968 (unreleased test pressing)
- "Kaleidescoptic" (sic) / "Song For Peace", Ignite Records, 1968
- "Take Me To The Mountains" / "Lose The Blues", Armadillo Records, 1970
- "Country Boy" / "Such A Joy", Armadillo Music, 1971
- "Don't Blame Me" / "Extension", Armadillo Records, 1976

=== Albums ===
- Take Me to the Mountains, Capitol Records, 1969
- Coming to a Head, Armadillo Records, 1971
- Psychedelic Yesterday, Ape Records, 1977
- In the Primo of Life, Moontower Sounds, 1983

=== Compilations ===
- Shiva’s Headband Classics, Vol.1: Down In Texas, Moontower Sounds, 1996
- The Singles Collection, Bluethroat Records, 2011
- Shiva’s Headband Classics, Vol.2: The Temple Of Rock And Roll, 2003

== Filmography ==
- The Thief Who Came to Dinner, directed by Bud Yorkin, 1973

== See also ==
- Music of Austin
