= Margaret Moser =

American music journalist (1954–2017)

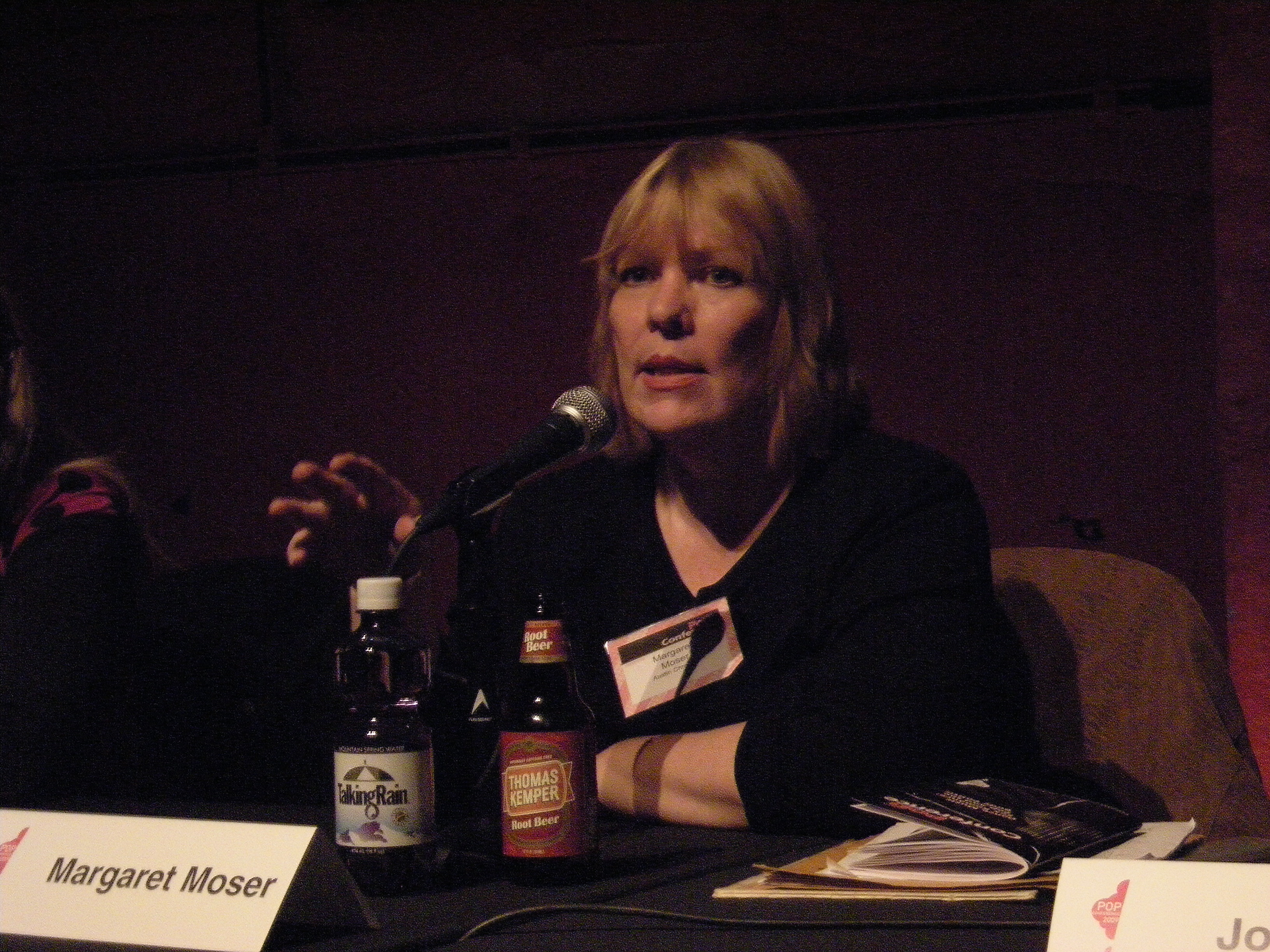
- Moser on the panel "Reconsidering the Groupie" at the 2009 Pop Conference, Experience Music Project
- Born: May 16, 1954; Chicago, Illinois, U.S.
- Died: August 25, 2017 (aged 63); San Antonio, Texas, U.S.
- Occupations: Journalist; critic; historian; singer
- Spouse: Mike Malone (m. 1984)
- Writing career
- Years active: 1979–2017
- Subjects: History of rock, punk music, the blues and the origins of music in Texas

Margaret Moser (May 16, 1954 – August 25, 2017), or Margaret Moser Malone, was an American journalist, music enthusiast, critic and historian, groupie, and backup singer. She was best known for her work as the director of the Austin Music Awards (AMA) in the South by Southwest festival and for her career in music journalism and criticism, which lasted more than thirty years. Moser also supported young artists, helping them get started and finding appropriate venues where they could play. She has been called the "patron saint of Austin music" by the Paramount Theatre.

== Early life ==
Moser was born on May 16, 1954, in Chicago to educated parents, Phyllis Jackson Stegall and Willard Cummings Moser, and raised in New Orleans, Houston, and San Antonio. She dropped out of high school. In 1973, Moser moved from San Antonio to Austin with her boyfriend Gary Kellaher.

== Groupie years ==
For several years, Moser was a groupie, getting into "where the action was." She often was seen with a group of other women called "The Texas Blondes", as John Cale, with whom Moser had a five-year relationship, named them. The couple met in 1979, as Moser was getting out of her first marriage. The Texas Blondes partied with musicians and were given free tickets and backstage passes. Moser was the leader of the group. They were active in the groupie scene until around 1982. Moser also performed as a backup singer in the 1980s for Dino Lee, as one of the "Jam & Jelly Girls."

== Journalism career ==
Moser worked at the Austin Sun starting in 1976, initially as a janitor before writing about music. She got her first interview when she told the newspaper's Backstage columnist that she knew Randy California and could interview him. When the Sun went out of business, the Austin Chronicle hired Moser in 1981 for its gossip column, "In One Ear." The column "became essential reading for Austin music fans," according to the Austin American-Statesman. Moser's writing about music and the scene in Austin was honest and included her own experiences with the "rock and roll lifestyle" in Austin. Alvin Crow said of her music criticism, "She knows how to draw the distinction between serious rock & roll and bubblegum. She's a true critic. She tells me somebody's good, I believe it."

On December 4, 1984, Moser married Mike Malone, a tattoo artist also known as Rollo Banks, and moved to Hawaii. The couple separated in the early 1990s; Moser returned to Austin and to the Austin Chronicle, where she began to write about the history of the Austin music scene. She worked on the history of rock, punk music and the blues, and the origins of music in Texas.

In 2012, Moser, along with Michael Ann Coker, established the South Texas Popular Culture Center (known as "Tex Pop") in San Antonio. Moser's husband, Steve Chaney, also helped her found the museum, of which Moser acted as curator. The museum's collection focuses on South Texas music from the 1950s to the 1980s.

== Cancer diagnosis and death ==
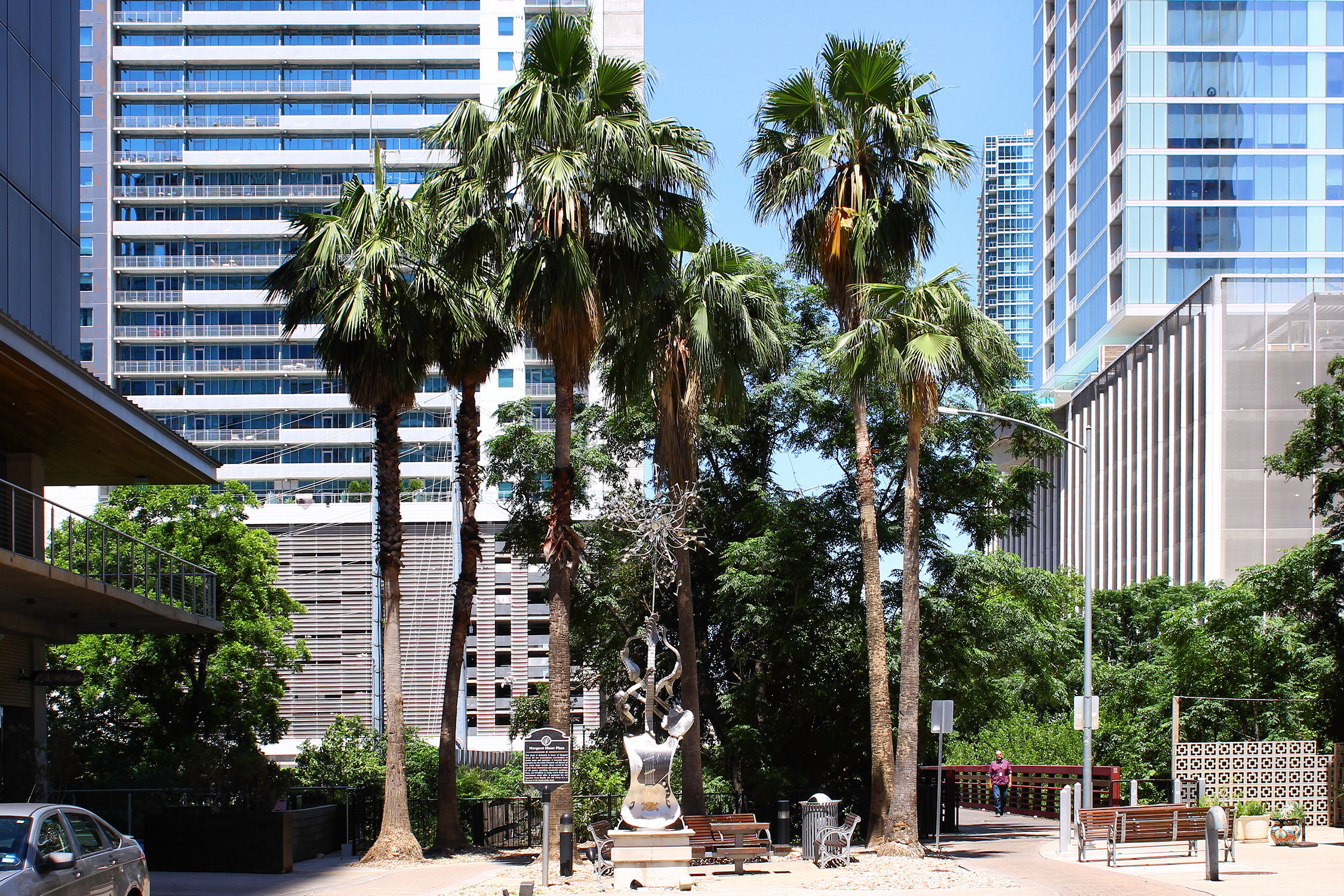
Margaret Moser Plaza

In February 2013, Moser was diagnosed with Stage IV colon cancer. She retired as director of the Austin Music Awards (AMA) in 2014. Before she retired, a small area next to the Austin Music Hall was named Margaret Moser Plaza. In that same year, she also retired from the Austin Chronicle. In 2016, the AMA started the Margaret Moser Award to recognize women in the Austin music community.

Around June 2017, Moser ended treatment for her cancer and had gone into hospice care. She invited friends to visit her before she died, holding a Sunday Open House. On August 25, 2017, she died at her home in San Antonio.

== Publications ==
- Edge Austin. with Andy Langer. Longstreet. 1998. ISBN 9781563525186.
- Rock Stars Do the Dumbest Things. with Bill Crawford. Macmillan + ORM. April 2007. ISBN 9781429978385.
- Movie Stars Do the Dumbest Things. with Michael Bertin. Macmillan + ORM. 2011. ISBN 9781429978378.
