= Vulcan Gas Company =

Music and entertainment venue in Austin, Texas

The Vulcan Gas Company is a live music and entertainment venue in Austin, Texas. Located at 418 E 6th Street, it opened in 2014 and adopted the name of a previous venue that operated in the 1960s. The two are otherwise unrelated. The club features stand-up comedy and EDM shows. The club is owned by Nick Franceschini. The venue is 9,500 sq feet, spans over 2 floors (658 person standing room capacity) and features a green room, catering room, 7 men's & 7 women's bathrooms, 2 large bars, and an outdoor terrace. The outdoor patio features a mural of comedians drawn by a local Austin artist.

Vulcan Gas Company was home to the Kill Tony podcast on Monday nights until 2023 when the podcast moved to Joe Rogan's Comedy Mothership in Austin, Texas. The podcast spotlights stand-up comedy. Joe Rogan has hosted multiple shows per month at the club alongside other local Austin stand-up comics. Big Laugh Comedy produces several stand-up comedy shows per week including hosting headliners and stand-up comedy showcases for local and touring comics. Several stand-up comedians including Rocky Dale Davis, Matt Rife, and Willie Barcena, have filmed their stand up specials at Vulcan Gas Company.

== See also ==
- Music of Austin
