= Gabriel Horn (filmmaker) =

American filmmaker (born 1978)

Gabriel Horn (Gabe Van Horn)
- Born: Gabriel Aaron Horn; March 15, 1978 (age 48); Fort Worth, Texas
- Occupations: Actor; filmmaker
- Years active: 1992–present

Gabriel Horn (also known as Gabe Van Horn; born 15 March 1978) is an American actor and filmmaker. Horn has appeared in and produced or consulted on numerous television shows, documentaries, and independent films, including Tom Huckabee's Carried Away and the 2026 Christina Ricci/Steven Ogg science fiction film The Dresden Sun.

Gabriel Horn is co-founder of Big Bear Film Summit, which, in the age of COVID-19, was designated one of the best 2020 online fests by FilmFreeway.

== Film ==
Born in the Dallas-Fort Worth area of the US, Gabriel Horn has long been part of the city's indie filmmaking community. His 16-year friendship with Texas colleague Tom Huckabee resulted in several television shows and films. In an interview with Dallas Observer after Huckabee's death, Horn stated, "...(he put) himself into creative talent with inspirational people...that's what he taught me to do as well."

Gabriel Horn was cast as the lead in the 2010 film Carried Away. Actor Bill Paxton was originally set to play Horn's father in the movie, but the role went to Mark Walters due to scheduling issues. Horn also served as co-producer. The film saw modest success and accolades. Director Tom Huckabee would later say, "It was Gabe who lit the fuse of Carried Away by reading the script and saying he wanted to star in it...it was (Horn's) enthusiasm for the project that caused me to commit all the money from the sale of my house in Los Angeles."

Gabriel Horn was a consulting producer on the 2026 film The Dresden Sun, starring Christina Ricci and Steven Ogg.

== Picasso's Christ ==
Gabriel Horn's "unfinished" documentary Picasso's Christ has received both praise and conflict. The movie features Oscar-nominated filmmaker David France, actor Xander Berkley, artist Shepard Fairey, and Robert King Wittman of the FBI's art fraud division, among others. Horn's often collaborator Tom Huckabee produced.

The Picasso's Christ central "crime & fraud" storyline, with little focus on Picasso, was later acquired by CatchLight Studios' Jason Clark, a producer having deep and current history with Seth MacFarlane and the Fuzzy Door production company. Collaborating with Horn, Clark shaped the crime storyline via location work in multiple parts of New York into a detailed mid 2024 podcast, with plans to later create a narrative TV series.

== Other documentaries ==
Gabriel Horn's 2008 documentary The '56 Fire covered the Texas-area McKee Refinery Fire Incident, known colloquially as The Shamrock Disaster. The documentary was later acquired by Amazon Studios.

== Big Bear Film Summit ==
In 2020 (during the COVID-19 pandemic), Gabriel Horn and partner Mike Hansen created Big Bear Film Summit, in Big Bear Lake, California. Forced by the global virus shutdown to go digital, the partners managed to have a well-received run, with subsequent fests announced for 2021.

The 2021 version of Big Bear Film Summit was also a success.

== Filmography ==
| Year | Title | Director | Producer | Actor | Notes |
|---|---|---|---|---|---|
| 1992 | Leap of Faith | No | No | Yes | |
| 1997 | Alone | No | Yes | Yes | Short film |
| 1997 | Walker, Texas Ranger (TV) | No | No | Yes | Student #2 |
| 1998 | Rooms | No | No | Yes | Jimmy |
| 1999 | Boys Don't Cry | No | No | Yes | Lester, Restraining Order Guy |
| 2000 | 75 Degrees in July | No | No | Yes | Concessioner |
| 2001 | Shot in the Heart | No | No | Yes | Bell Captain |
| 2001 | The West Wing (TV) | No | No | Yes | |
| 2002 | Little White Boy | No | No | Yes | |
| 2003 | Once Human | No | No | Yes | Short film |
| 2006 | Buttercup | No | Yes | Yes | Zack |
| 2006 | Ash | No | Yes | Yes | |
| 2007 | Fighting With Anger | No | No | Yes | Starring Willie Nelson; Waiter |
| 2008 | Nick Plenty: Internet Millionaire! | Yes | Yes | Yes | Actor six episodes; director eight episodes |
| 2008 | Redemption | No | No | Yes | Short film |
| 2008 | The Lawn Boy | No | No | Yes | |
| 2009 | The '56 Fire | Yes | Yes | No | Documentary |
| 2009 | Night Crawlers | No | Yes | Yes | Coop |
| 2009 | Carried Away | No | Yes | Yes | Co-producer; Ed Franklin |
| 2009 | One Bad Mice | No | No | Yes | Bad Guy #2 |
| 2009 | Lovenutz | No | Yes | Yes | Executive Producer |
| 2009 | The Consultants | No | No | Yes | Joshua |
| 2010 | Young Producers | No | No | Yes | Santa Trainee #5 |
| 2011 | Small Timers | No | No | Yes | Bank Pole Dancer |
| 2011 | Ghost Breakers | No | Yes | Yes | Series, 2011–2016; Gabriel |
| 2012 | Entrevista | Yes | No | Yes | Short film |
| 2012 | Dangerous | No | No | Yes | Travis Bathanial |
| 2014 | Studio Lot: The Webseries | Yes | Yes | No | Co-producer; Short film |
| 2014 | The Ladies of the House | No | No | Yes | Jacob |
| 2015 | The Briefcase | No | Yes | No | Consulting producer |
| 2015 | V.O. The Show | No | No | Yes | Crazed Brozart Fan |
| 2015 | The Lollipop Thief | No | No | Yes | Male Newscaster (Voice) |
| 2017 | Alternative Math | No | No | Yes | Crazy Dad |
| 2019 | Taking Tiger Mountain | No | Yes | No | Co-producer; Starring Bill Paxton |
| 2019 | Phalaris's Bull: Solving the Riddle of the Great Big World | Yes | Yes | No | Consulting producer |
| 2020 | The Trap Door at the Edge of the Universe | No | Yes | Yes | Charlie/Merlin; consulting producer |
| 2022 | Episode 7: Touch the Earth | Yes | Yes | Yes | The Wanderer; short film |
| 2022 | Wing Dad | No | Yes | Yes | Short film |
| 2026 | The Dresden Sun | No | Yes | Yes | Starring Christina Ricci; consulting producer |
