= Blade Runner (a movie) =

1979 novella by William S. Burroughs

- Cover of the first edition
- Author: William S. Burroughs based on The Bladerunner by Alan E. Nourse
- Language: English
- Genre: Science fiction novella
- Publisher: Blue Wind Press
- Publication date: 1979
- Publication place: United States
- Media type: Print (hardcover and paperback)
- ISBN: 0-912652-46-2
- OCLC: 25501804
- Dewey Decimal: 813/.5/4
- LC Class: PZ4.B972 Bl PS3552.U75

Blade Runner (a movie) is a science fiction novella by Beat Generation author William S. Burroughs, first published in 1979.

The novella began as a story treatment for a proposed film adaptation of Alan E. Nourse's novel The Bladerunner. A later edition published in the 1980s changed the formatting of the title to Blade Runner, a movie. Burroughs' treatment is set in the early 21st century and involves mutated viruses and "a medical-care apocalypse". The term "blade runner" referred to a smuggler of medical supplies, e.g. scalpels.

The title was later bought for use in Ridley Scott's 1982 science fiction film Blade Runner. The plot of that film was based on Philip K. Dick's Do Androids Dream of Electric Sheep? and not the Nourse and Burroughs source material, although the film does incorporate the term "blade runner", though with a different meaning from in the novel.

== Adaptations ==
Blade Runner (a movie) was loosely adapted as the 1983 film Taking Tiger Mountain, after co-director Tom Huckabee purchased the rights to the novella from Burroughs for $100.
