= Ali Khoynezhad =

Iranian-American surgeon and researcher

Ali B. Khoynezhad (born 1970) is an Iranian-American cardiothoracic surgeon, medical device inventor, and medical researcher specializing in aortic and heart rhythm surgeries. He is medical director of Cardiovascular Surgery at MemorialCare Heart & Vascular Institute at Long Beach Medical Center, Director of Aortic and Arrhythmia Surgery at MemorialCare Heart & Vascular Institute. Previously, he served as Director of Aortic Surgery at Cedars-Sinai Medical Center and Professor of Surgery at the David Geffen School of Medicine at UCLA.

== Early life and education ==
Khoynezhad was born in Iran in 1970. He received his medical degree from the University of Cologne College of Medicine in Germany in 1996. He completed a general surgery internship at Wake Forest University Baptist Medical Center and a general surgery residency at North Shore University Hospital. He then completed a residency in cardiothoracic surgery at Montefiore Medical Center.

Khoynezhad pursued fellowships in minimally invasive cardiac surgery at Lenox Hill Hospital and in vascular and endovascular surgery at Harbor–UCLA Medical Center. He received board certification from the American Board of Surgery in 2004 and from the American Board of Thoracic Surgery in 2006.

== Career ==
Khoynezhad started working at the University of Nebraska Medical Center and Creighton University Medical Center as an assistant professor in 2005.

He subsequently joined Cedars-Sinai Medical Center in 2010 as Director of Aortic Surgery and rose from associate professor of Surgery to Full Professor. In 2016, he also became one of the youngest professors at the UCLA David Geffen School of Medicine. Khoynezhad had a NIH-funded translational research laboratory at Cedars-Sinai Medical Center. During his tenure at Cedars-Sinai, the Heart Institute rose through the ranks from 53rd to a top-three heart program in the United States.

== Lawsuit ==
In 2018, the estate of actor Bill Paxton filed a lawsuit against Cedars-Sinai Medical Center and surgeon Khoynezhad for a Bentall operation performed on February 14, 2017, for congenital bicuspid aortic valve disease and an ascending aortic aneurysm. The late actor developed a hemorrhagic stroke on hospital day 11 and died. Khoynezhad was comfortable with his care and denied any wrongdoing; however, the hospital decided to settle the lawsuit due to publicity reasons.

During the course of the lawsuit, the plaintiff attorneys started an aggressive online campaign aimed at damaging Khoynezhad's reputation. They described Paxton's operation as "maverick, high-risk, and unconventional", although the Bentall procedure is a half-century-old cardiac operation. Furthermore, and without any evidence, Khoynezhad was accused of not being at Paxton's bedside when the complication happened.

Finally, there were online rumors that Khoynezhad left Cedars-Sinai Medical Center because of Paxton's operation. However, Khoynezhad gave his six-month notice of resignation in December 2016, three months prior to Paxton's operation.

== Contributions ==
Khoynezhad is recipient of TSFRE Alley-Sheridan Scholarship, a graduate of the Executive Leadership Program in Health Policy and Management at The Heller School of Brandeis University, and the Society of University Surgeons’ Leadership Agility Program at the Kellogg School of Management at Northwestern University. He is also the recipient of an ACS traveling fellowship to Germany. He is one of the youngest surgeons to be admitted into the American Association for Thoracic Surgery, served as President of the 21st Century Cardiothoracic Surgical Society, and co-founded the ERAS Cardiac Society. His research has appeared in more than 315 peer-reviewed publications, with over 5,200 citations, Google Scholar placing him among the top 5% of scientists. He participated in an ERAS Cardiac Surgery publication in JAMA Surgery in 2019, which became the most commonly downloaded manuscript for that journal.

Khoynezhad also has multiple inventions, and his discoveries have resulted in many inventions and patents including valve-in-valve Transcatheter Aortic and Mitral Valve Replacement (TAVR, TMVR) for mechanical heart valves.

Khoynezhad pioneered and trained many surgeons in China, Japan, Singapore, Taiwan, and South Korea, and was named Honorary Professor at Capital Medical University and Beijing Anzhen Hospital, Beijing, China, in 2011. He was involved early on in heart and lung transplantation at Cedars-Sinai Medical Center and subsequently focused on aortic and Atrial fibrillation procedures. He developed a minimally invasive approach (including lower partial sternotomy) for performing keyhole valve and aortic surgery, and has been involved from the beginning in TAVR clinical trials. He holds the first FDA-approved PS-IDE for the ascending aorta, a percutaneous remedy for ascending aortic pathologies.

Khoynezhad performed the first Frozen Elephant Trunk procedure for acute type A dissection in the United States, and the first thoracoabdominal aortic aneurysm replacement in Tehran, Iran. He is also the first to use true and false lumen stent grafting for endovascular treatment of EVAR and TEVAR, and the first Beating Heart Total Arch Replacement in the United States. After a seven-year tenure at Cedars-Sinai Medical Center, Khoynezhad built the largest aortic program on the West Coast and joined MemorialCare Health System in 2017, where he has been running the aortic and AF program in South Los Angeles County for eight years.
