= Jack A. Roth =

American thoracic surgeon and cancer researcher

Jack Alan Roth
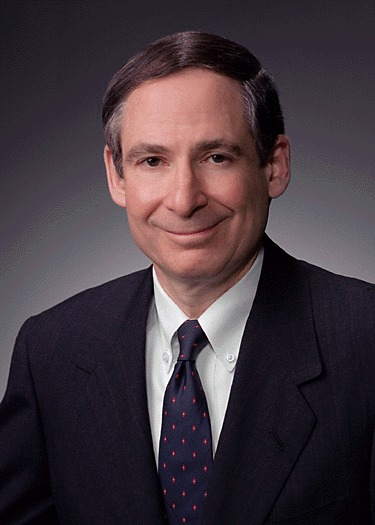
- Education: Cornell University (B.A., 1967); Johns Hopkins University School of Medicine (M.D., 1971); UCLA School of Medicine
- Known for: Pioneering gene therapy for thoracic cancers p53 tumor suppressor replacement Nanoparticle gene delivery (TUSC2/FUS1); Multimodality trials in lung cancer
- Spouse(s): Elizabeth Grimm, PhD
- Children: Johanna Terpening, JD; Katherine Roth, MD
- Awards: Fellow, American College of Surgeons; Fellow, American Association for the Advancement of Science; President's Faculty Excellence Award, MD Anderson (2019)
- Scientific career
- Fields: Thoracic surgery, Oncology, Gene therapy
- Workplaces: National Institutes of Health; University of Texas MD Anderson Cancer Center

Jack Alan Roth is an American physician-scientist, thoracic surgeon, and translational cancer researcher best known for leading early clinical development of gene-based therapies for thoracic malignancies and for pioneering multidisciplinary, molecularly informed approaches to lung and esophageal cancer. He is a professor in the Department of Thoracic and Cardiovascular Surgery at the University of Texas MD Anderson Cancer Center, director of the W. M. Keck Center for Innovative Cancer Therapies, and chief of the Section of Thoracic Molecular Oncology.

== Early life and education ==
Roth received a Bachelor of Arts in economics from Cornell University in 1967 and the M.D. degree from the Johns Hopkins University School of Medicine in 1971. He completed surgical internship and residency training at Johns Hopkins and postgraduate research and clinical training in surgical oncology and thoracic surgery at the University of California, Los Angeles (UCLA). He later undertook advanced training in cell and molecular biology.

== Academic and clinical career ==
Roth served as Senior Investigator and Head of the Thoracic Oncology Section in the Surgery Branch at the National Cancer Institute before joining MD Anderson Cancer Center in 1986 as Professor and Chair of the Department of Thoracic and Cardiovascular Surgery. He was department chair from 1986 to 2007, later became the Bud S. Johnson Distinguished Clinical Chair (Emeritus), and was appointed Chief of the Section of Thoracic Molecular Oncology. He also founded and serves as Director of the W. M. Keck Center for Innovative Cancer Therapies.

== Research and contributions ==
Roth's research integrates clinical thoracic oncology with molecular and gene therapy approaches. His work spans randomized clinical trials, first-in-human gene-therapy protocols, systemic nanoparticle delivery of tumor suppressor genes, and translational studies combining gene therapy with targeted agents and immunotherapies.

=== Neoadjuvant and multimodality trials ===
Roth was principal investigator on seminal clinical trials that established a role for perioperative chemotherapy in resectable stage IIIA non-small cell lung cancer. A randomized trial comparing perioperative chemotherapy plus surgery versus surgery alone showed a survival advantage for the combined approach.

=== Tumor suppressor gene therapy (p53) ===
Beginning in the 1990s, Roth and collaborators developed retroviral and adenoviral vectors expressing wild-type p53 and conducted early clinical trials delivering p53 to human tumors. He was principal investigator for the first tumor-suppressor gene therapy clinical trials approved by the NIH Recombinant DNA Advisory Committee and the U.S. Food and Drug Administration. These trials evaluated intratumoral Ad-p53 (INGN 201 / Advexin) in lung and head-and-neck cancers and provided mechanistic and early efficacy evidence, including induction of p53-regulated apoptotic pathways and tumor regression when combined with radiotherapy.

While adenoviral p53 constructs evaluated by Roth and collaborators formed part of the scientific basis for later commercialization efforts, the first regulatory approval for an adenoviral p53 product (Gendicine) occurred in China in 2003; Roth's clinical development work in the United States was influential in establishing feasibility and proof-of-principle for p53 replacement strategies.

=== Systemic nanoparticle gene delivery (TUSC2/FUS1) ===
Roth led preclinical and clinical development of systemic nanoparticle-mediated delivery of tumor suppressor genes, notably TUSC2 (FUS1). A Phase I trial of intravenously delivered TUSC2 nanoparticles in patients with advanced non-small cell lung cancer demonstrated uptake by tumors, expression in tumor tissue, and downstream pathway effects with acceptable safety—providing the first clinical evidence for systemic nanoparticle gene delivery in lung cancer.

Subsequent work from Roth's team has shown that TUSC2 delivery can modulate the tumor immune microenvironment and synergize with immune checkpoint blockade and targeted agents.

=== Translational programs and SPORE leadership ===
Roth has been a leader in institutional and national translational initiatives. He has been co-principal investigator on major National Cancer Institute programs, including an NCI Lung Cancer Specialized Programs of Research Excellence (SPORE), and has headed multidisciplinary teams integrating genomics, biomarker discovery, and early clinical trials.

== Non-Invasive Treatment of Stage I Non-small Cell Lung Cancer ==
Roth and colleagues' STARS trials found SABR non-inferior to surgery for overall and progression-free survival in operable stage IA NSCLC, offering a less toxic option without compromising survival, though its role versus surgery needs confirmation via randomized trial.

== Education initiatives ==
Roth established one of the first General Thoracic Surgery Fellowships at MD Anderson approved by the American Board of Thoracic Surgery. The fellowship emphasizes training in general thoracic surgery for surgeons who will specialize in this field.

== Honors and awards ==
- Lucy Wortham James Basic Research Award, Society of Surgical Oncology (1992)
- Charles Moetel Lectureship, Mayo Clinic (1997)
- Gordon Hamilton-Fairley Lecture Award, British Association for Cancer Research and British Society for Surgical Oncology (1997)
- Elaine & Gerald Schuster Distinguished Visiting Lecturer, Dana-Farber Cancer Institute, Harvard Medical School (2000)
- Inaugural Glick Lecturer, Johns Hopkins School of Medicine (2004)
- Fellow, American Association for the Advancement of Science (2007)
- The Otis W. and Pearl L. Walters Faculty Achievement Award in Clinical Research, MD Anderson (2008)
- Honorary Member, American Society for Radiation Oncology (2015)
- Jack A. Roth Fellowship in Thoracic Surgical Oncology, American Association for Thoracic Surgery Foundation (2017–present)
- President's Faculty Excellence Award in Research, MD Anderson (2019)
- ScholarGPS Awards for Highly Ranked Scholar in the top 0.05%

== Bibliometrics and selected works ==
As of 2025 Roth is the author or co-author of more than 700 peer-reviewed publications and multiple textbooks. Google Scholar lists an h-index of 147 with over 89,000 citations.

=== Selected publications ===
- Roth, JA (1996). "Retrovirus-mediated wild-type p53 gene transfer to tumors of patients with lung cancer". Nature Medicine. 2 (9): 985–91. doi:10.1038/nm0996-985. PMID 8782455.
- Roth, JA (1994). "A randomized trial comparing perioperative chemotherapy and surgery with surgery alone in resectable stage IIIA non-small-cell lung cancer". Journal of the National Cancer Institute. 86 (9): 673–80. doi:10.1093/jnci/86.9.673. PMID 8158698.
- Swisher, SG; Roth, JA (2003). "Induction of p53-regulated genes and tumor regression in lung cancer patients after intratumoral delivery of adenoviral p53 (INGN 201) and radiation therapy". Clinical Cancer Research. 9 (1): 93–101. PMID 12538458.
- Lu, C; Roth, JA (2012). "Phase I clinical trial of systemically administered TUSC2(FUS1) nanoparticles mediating functional gene transfer in humans". PLOS ONE. 7 (4) e34833. Bibcode:2012PLoSO...734833L. doi:10.1371/journal.pone.0034833. PMC 3338819. PMID 22558101.
