= Jenette Goldstein =

American actress (born 1960)

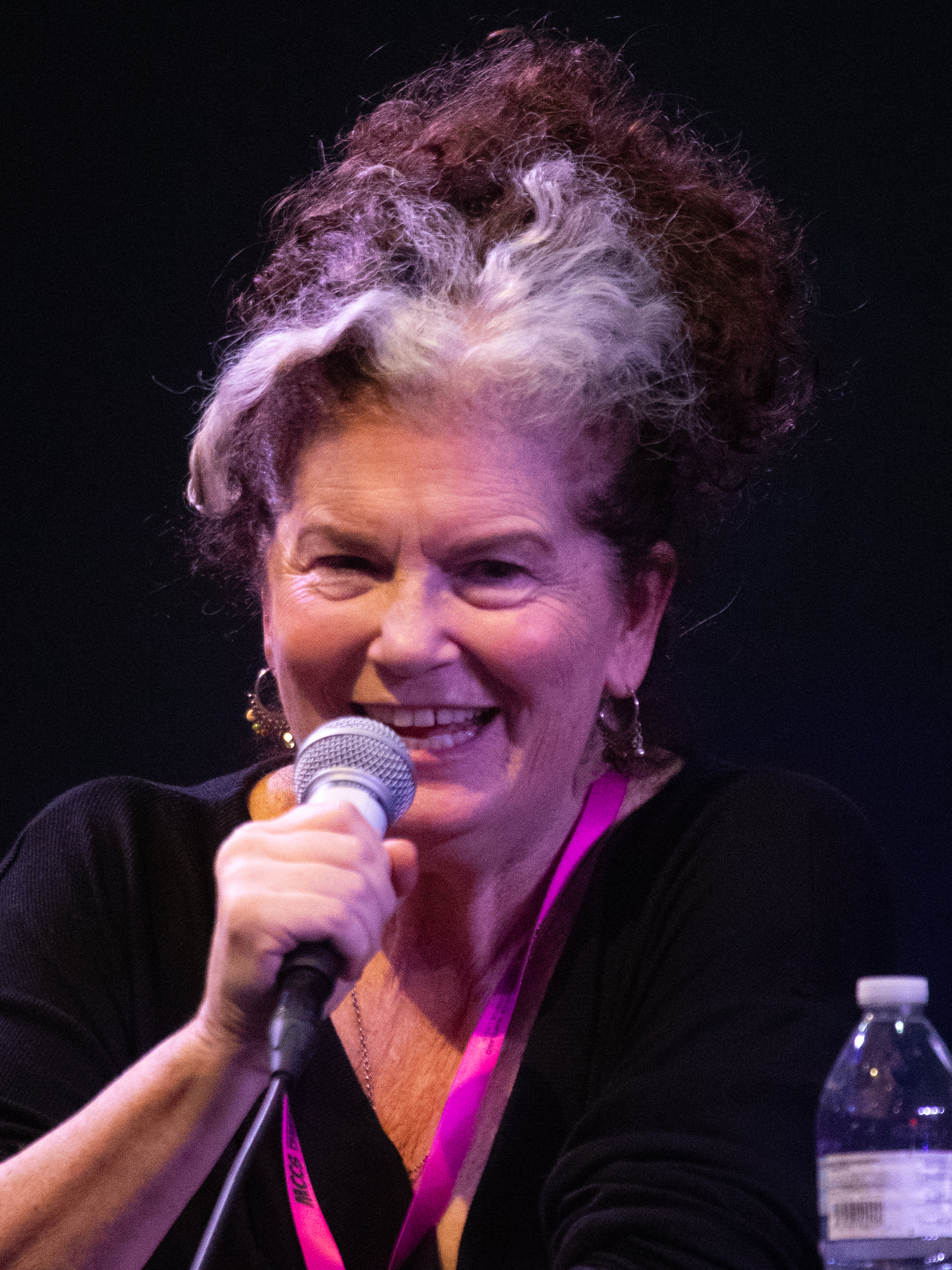
- Goldstein in 2023
- Born: February 4, 1960 (age 66)
- Occupations: Actress; businesswoman
- Years active: 1986–present

Jenette Goldstein (born February 4, 1960) is an American actress. Known for her collaborations with director James Cameron, she won a Saturn Award for her portrayal of Private Vasquez in his 1986 sci-fi horror film Aliens. She reteamed with Cameron to play Janelle Voight in Terminator 2 (1991) and had a small role in Titanic (1997). Her other notable film appearances include Diamondback in Near Dark (1987) and Meagan Shapiro in Lethal Weapon 2 (1989), alongside cameos in Star Trek Generations (1994) and Fear and Loathing in Las Vegas (1998). On television, Goldstein has played guest roles on series such as ER, Six Feet Under, 24, and Star Trek: Short Treks.

== Early life ==
Goldstein's family is from Brazil and Morocco. She is Jewish. Goldstein trained as a gymnast before starting her acting career.

== Career ==
Goldstein's first film role was in James Cameron's Aliens (1986), where she played Private Vasquez. The performance won her the Saturn Award for Best Supporting Actress the following year. She next appeared as Diamondback, a mysterious vampire, in Kathryn Bigelow's neo-Western horror film Near Dark (1987), receiving her second Saturn Award nomination for the role. She ended the decade with parts in The Presidio, Miracle Mile (both 1988), and Lethal Weapon 2 (1989).

Goldstein played Janelle Voight, the foster mother of John Connor (and the T-1000 Terminator impersonating her), in James Cameron's big-budget sci-fi action film Terminator 2: Judgment Day, which broke box office records upon its release in 1991. Next, she made cameos as a USS Enterprise science officer in Star Trek Generations (1994), an Irish immigrant mother in Titanic (1997)—her third collaboration with Cameron—and a hotel maid in Fear and Loathing in Las Vegas (1998). Her other notable film roles in the 1990s included supporting roles in Fair Game (1995) and Living Out Loud (1998). Goldstein's television work includes guest appearances on MacGyver, L.A. Law, ER, Six Feet Under, Alias, and 24.

== Other work ==
Goldstein is the owner of the chain store company Jenette Bras, a large-cup bra specialist known for its slogan, "The alphabet starts at 'D'".

== Filmography ==
=== Film ===
Year	Title	Role	Notes
1986	Aliens	Private Vasquez	
1987	Near Dark	Diamondback	
1988	The Presidio	Patti Jean Lynch	
1988	Miracle Mile	Beverly Hills Chick #1	
1989	Lethal Weapon 2	Meagan Shapiro	
1991	Terminator 2: Judgment Day	Janelle Voight	
1993	Donato and Daughter	Det. Judy McCartney	Television film
1994	Star Trek Generations	Science Officer	
1995	Fair Game	Rosa	
1996	Borderline	Unknown	Short film
1997	Touch Me	Gabrielle	
1997	Titanic	Irish Mother	
1998	Senseless	Nurse Alvarez	
1998	Fear and Loathing in Las Vegas	Alice the Maid	
1998	Living Out Loud	Fanny	
1999	Smut	Mary Jane	
2001	It Is What It Is	Rivka Stern	
2002	Clockstoppers	Doctor	
2002	Home Room	Main Nurse	
2003	Duplex	Moderator	
2008	Autopsy	Nurse Marian	
2014	Under the Hollywood Sign	Mary	

=== Television ===
Year	Title	Role	Notes
1987	Max Headroom	Bella	Episode: "Dream Thieves"
1991	MacGyver	Rachel Bradley	Episode: "The Prometheus Syndrome"
1992	Civil Wars	Patricia Twain	Episode: "Drone of Arc"
1994	L.A. Law	Tanya Geiss	Episode: "Cold Cuts"
1995	The Client	Karen Kelso	Episode: "The Peach Orchard"
1998	7th Heaven	Mrs. Reese	Episode: "The Legacy"
1998–2004	ER	Helicopter Pilot / Judy Stiles	2 episodes
2000	Strong Medicine	Unnamed Friend	Episode: "Dependency"
2001	Six Feet Under	Obstetrician	Episode: "The Trip"
2003	Alias	Medical Bay Technician	Episode: "Double Agent"
2004	24	Rae Plachecki	2 episodes
2005	The Inside	Traci Armstrong	Episode: "Loneliest Number"
2010	Medium	Mrs. Pinsley	Episode: "Allison Rolen Got Married"
2013	A Hollywood Affair	Agent	Episode: "Agent Meeting"
2019	Star Trek: Short Treks	USS Enterprise computer (voice)	2 episodes

=== Music videos ===
Year	Song	Artist	Notes
1988	"Reach"	Martini Ranch	Directed by James Cameron

=== Video games ===
Year	Title	Role
2000	Star Trek: Invasion	Typhoon Engineer
2002	X-Men: Next Dimension	Jean Grey / Phoenix
2009	Real Heroes: Firefighter	Esmeralda "Ezzy" Vasquez

== Awards and nominations ==
- Saturn Awards
  - 1987: Best Supporting Actress – Aliens (Won)
  - 1988: Best Supporting Actress – Near Dark (Nominated)
- DVD Exclusive Awards
  - 2003: Best Audio Commentary (New for DVD) – Aliens (Nominated) with James Cameron, Michael Biehn, Carrie Henn, Christopher Henn, Lance Henriksen, Gale Anne Hurd, Pat McClung, Bill Paxton, Dennis Skotak, Robert Skotak, and Stan Winston
