= Carried Away (2009 film) =

American film by Tom Huckabee

- Directed by: Tom Huckabee
- Written by: Tom Huckabee
- Produced by: James M. Johnston
- Starring: Gabriel Horn; Juli Erickson; Bryan Massey
- Cinematography: Ron Gonzalez
- Edited by: Sam Crutsinger; Benjamin Wilbanks
- Production companies: Beautiful Confusion Films; New Palace Films
- Release date: July 1, 2009
- Running time: 100 minutes
- Language: English

Carried Away is a 2009 film written and directed by Tom Huckabee, starring Gabriel Horn, Juli Erickson, Mark Walters, Bryan Massey, and Tyler Corie.

== Plot ==
Ed Franklin returns home to learn that his parents are on the brink of divorce, his brothers are fighting, and his grandmother has had a stroke and been placed in a nursing home. He decideds to liberate his grandmother from her nursing home and take her from Fort Worth, Texas across country to Hollywood. In pursuit are his father and two brothers who are determined to get her back.

== Cast ==
- Gabriel Horn as Ed Franklin
- Juli Erickson as Granny
- Mark Walters as Rex Franklin
- Bryan Massey as Steve Franklin
- Tyler Corie as Davy Franklin
- Morgana Shaw as Jean Franklin

== Awards ==
- Best Feature Film - Oxford Film Festival (Mississippi)
- Best Feature Film - Da Vinci Film Festival

== Festivals ==
- Breckenridge Festival of Film
- Bare Bones International Film Festival
- Crossroads Film Festival
- Oxford Film Festival
- DaVinci Film Festival
- Byron Bay International Film Festival
- Dallas International Film Festival

== Confidence Bay ==
Carried Away was the first feature film to use the world's first mobile high-definition edit suite, Confidence Bay, during the filming process. The film was shot tapeless on the Red One and Confidence Bay transferred all the data from the camera, synchronized all audio and video, created dailies, and assembled a rough cut of the film on locations spanning Texas, Arizona, and California. A 90-minute rough cut of the film was shown to the cast and crew at the wrap of the film.

Once filming was completed, Confidence Bay parked at Dockweiler State Beach in Los Angeles, CA where the majority of the film was edited. The film was picture locked only a month after the film wrapped.
