= Tom Huckabee =

American filmmaker (1955–2022)

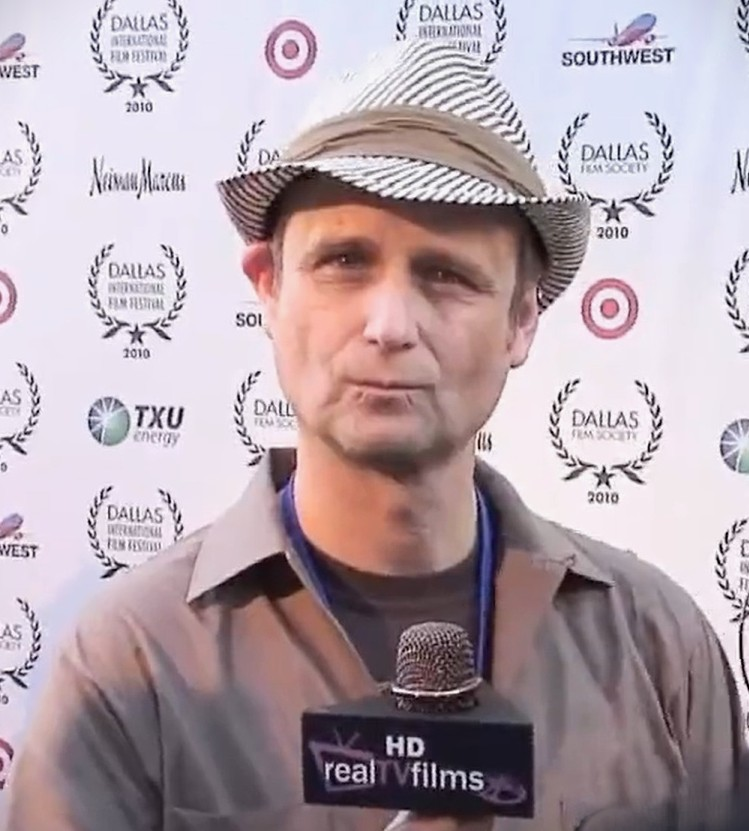
- Huckabee in 2010
- Born: Tom Huckabee; September 2, 1955; Ft. Worth, Texas, USA
- Died: January 28, 2022 (aged 66); Ft. Worth, Texas, USA
- Occupations: Film director; producer; screenwriter; musician
- Years active: 1973–2022
- Spouses: Barbara Cohen (m. 1983; died 2006)

Tom Huckabee (2 September 1955 – 28 January 2022) was an American film director, producer, fine artist, and screenwriter. Huckabee was also a musician and songwriter in the early US hard punk music scene of the 70s and 80s, primarily through his Austin Texas band known as the Huns, and then later via the band Re*Cords (Reversible Cords), a group once called, "an anarchic quartet, given to street performances and occasional scrapes with the law".

Tom Huckabee is best known for his longtime association with US actor Bill Paxton, both in personal and professional capacities, most notably from Huckabee's "third phase" collaboration with Paxton's first film, the 1983 science fiction movie Taking Tiger Mountain.

== Career ==
=== Death of a Rock Star ===
One of Tom Huckabee's early films, Death of a Rock Star, was loosely based on The Doors singer Jim Morrison. The movie was well-received, and featured a scene with Steve Bridgewater, an Austin police officer who would later be involved in a "bust" of Huckabee's Huns band.

=== Huns ===
Tom Huckabee was a founding member and drummer of the 1978 punk band, Huns. Huckabee referred to the work of the Huns as, "more anthropological than artistic." When a September 1978 Huns show made news from inciting a major police raid at a nightclub in Austin, Texas Huckabee said of his band, "We sounded like the Sex Pistols, with Sid on every instrument."

=== Re*Cords, aka Reversible Cords ===
Tom Huckabee co-created and provided percussion for the late 70s Austin punk band Re*Cords, aka Reversible Cords. Huckabee's band was a well-known contributor to the Texas punk scene, often at the Raul's Nightclub. Described as "Avant-punk," "art rock," and "Cajun-punk," the Re*Cords broke ground and focused on ironic social statements, gaining a reputation as, "one of the most important bands in Austin." In 1979, the Re*Cords did a Raul's backup session with psychedelic rock pioneer Roky Erickson, most especially on the song "Creature With the Atom Brain." The Austin fanzine Sluggo! reviewed the show as, "the most electric nite at Raul's ever." In 1980, Huckabee was said to be the Re*Cords band member, "who makes a considerable virtue out of sheer unpredictability" with his cymbal solo "that's amazing for its utter incomprehensibility."

=== Taking Tiger Mountain ===
The first official collaboration between Tom Huckabee and actor Bill Paxton was the 1983 film Taking Tiger Mountain. In 1979, Huckabee took over directorial duties from Kent Smith and transformed the movie into a different telling of the tale, with a direction change and reflections of William S. Burroughs. After the film's San Francisco premiere in March 1983, the first review of the film came from Judy Stone of San Francisco Chronicle, who said Smith and Huckabee were, "remarkably successful in evoking an ominous vision of the future." In a 2012 interview, Huckabee was asked about the 1983 premiere, and if the original co-director Kent Smith was happy with the outcome: "I don’t know if he was ever totally happy with the film. None of us were, really. It was a true experimental film. And a lot of things were done kind of ass-backwards."

=== James Cameron psychedelics ===
Tom Huckabee later shot and edited a 1980s documentary regarding psychedelics, starring James Cameron. In the footage, never officially released, Cameron talks extensively under Huckabee's direction about his many positive and risky experiences with psilocybin and LSD, among other deeply cerebral substances.

=== Martini Ranch: Reach ===
Tom Huckabee and Bill Paxton co-wrote a script called Lonesome Cowgirls: Amazon Women of the West for director James Cameron. Jim adapted and modified the script into an all-star 1988 music video known as Martini Ranch, the namesake of Paxton's former band Martini Ranch. The music video, also called "Reach," was shot in Veluzat Motion Picture Ranch and starred Kathryn Bigelow, Bill Paxton, Lance Henriksen, Paul Reiser, and Bud Cort, with others.

=== Traveller and Lone Star Film Festival ===
In 1997, Tom Huckabee was associate producer and music supervisor on Bill Paxton's Traveller. With help from Paxton in later years, Tom Huckabee became inaugural founder and artistic director of The Lone Star Film Festival in 2007. Huckabee was remembered for his festival works with a major tribute in Dallas Film & Creative Industries' 2022 event.

=== Arthur C. Clarke: Beyond 2001 ===
In 2001, Tom Huckabee produced and directed a major live event, "Arthur C. Clarke: Beyond 2001". Held at the Playboy Mansion, the "gala" featured James Cameron, Patrick Stewart, Morgan Freeman, and Buzz Aldrin.

=== Frailty ===
Tom Huckabee was involved with Bill Paxton's 2001 directorial debut movie Frailty, starring Bill and Matthew McConaughey, as an Executive Producer. However, in a lengthy 2019 interview Huckabee states, "...my contribution was mostly as a catalyst. I'm credited as executive producer, which may make people think I had something to do with financing, which I didn't. Besides 'finding' the property and foisting it on Bill, I may have made small contributions to the script in the final stages of development, but I wouldn’t want to take anything away from the sole author, Brent Hanley, nor chief producers Paxton, David Kirschner, and Corey Sienega..."

=== Carried Away ===
In 2009, Tom Huckabee wrote and directed the feature film Carried Away. The movie premiered 9 April 2010, and was produced by James Johnston, starring Juli Erickson, Gabriel Horn (who also co-produced), Morgana Shaw, and others. Tom Huckabee said of his Carried Away, "It's semi-autobiographical...a lot of the family dysfunction stuff is pretty accurate." An early review of Carried Away stated, "...the film asks serious questions about Alzheimer’s and dementia."

=== White Rabbit Red Rabbit ===
Tom Huckabee personally secured talent for two of the five March 2017 experimental theatrical performances of Fort Worth's "White Rabbit Red Rabbit". Huckabee was Consulting Producer for Amphibian Stage Productions (part of National New Play Network), who mounted the play. The well-reviewed event featured actors Xander Berkeley and his wife Sarah Clarke, both connected to Huckabee through professional association.

== Personal life ==
Tom Huckabee was born in Fort Worth, Texas.

Tom Huckabee married prolific Hollywood casting director Barbara Cohen on 8 October 1983. They were married until 27 May 2006, when Cohen died from breast cancer in their Hollywood Hills home.

== Death ==
Tom Huckabee died 28 January 2022, from pancreatic cancer. Huckabee was considered "a mainstay of Fort Worth's film scene".

== Filmography ==
=== Filmmaking credits ===
Year	Title	Director	Producer	Writer	Technical	Special Thanks
1981	Death of a Rock Star (Short)	Yes	Yes	Yes	Yes	No
1983	Taking Tiger Mountain	Yes	Yes	Yes	Yes	No
1987	Hollywood Erotic Film Festival	No	Yes	No	No	No
1988	Martini Ranch: Reach	No	Yes	Yes	No	No
1993	Rage	No	No	Yes	No	No
1995	Adventures of the Old West (Disney)	No	No	Yes	No	No
1996	Deep In the Heart	No	No	Yes	No	No
1997	Mahalia Jackson: The Power and the Glory	No	No	No	No	Yes
1997	Traveller	No	Yes	No	Yes	No
1998	Prophecies (A&E)	No	Yes	Yes	No	No
2001	Frailty	No	Yes	No	No	No
2001	Arthur C. Clarke: Beyond 2001	Yes	Yes	No	Yes	No
2002	The Making of Frailty	No	No	No	No	Yes
2003	The University Greys: From Students to Soldiers	No	Yes	No	No	No
2004	Madonna in Madonna: Love Profusion	No	No	No	Yes	No
2005	Eye For an Eye	No	Yes	No	No	No
2005	The Greatest Game Ever Played (Shia LaBeouf)	No	No	No	Yes	No
2006	TV Junkie	No	Yes	No	No	No
2007	Cul de Sac	No	Yes	No	No	No
2008	The Dixie Hummingbirds: 80 Years Young	No	No	No	No	Yes
2009	Celebration: The Video Collection (Madonna)	No	No	No	Yes	No
2009	Night Crawlers	No	No	No	No	Yes
2009	The Family Cowsill (Short)	Yes	No	No	No	No
2009	Carried Away	Yes	Yes	Yes	No	No
2011	Ghostbreakers (TV; 4 Episodes)	No	No	Yes	No	No
2013	Confessions of an Ecstasy Advocate (Short)	No	No	Yes	No	No
2014	The Starck Club	No	Yes	No	No	No
2014	Her Wilderness	No	No	No	No	Yes
2015	The Price (Short)	Yes	Yes	No	No	No
2019	Taking Tiger Mountain: Revisited	No	Yes	Yes	No	Yes
2019	Dead Fellas (Bryan Massey)	No	Yes	Yes	No	No
2022	Touch the Earth (Short)	No	Yes	Yes	No	No
2022	Cold Wind Blowing (Short)	No	No	No	No	Yes
