= The Bladerunner =

1974 SF novel by Alan E. Nourse

- First edition
- Author: Alan E. Nourse
- Cover artist: Joel Schick
- Language: English
- Genre: Science fiction
- Publisher: David McKay Publications
- Publication date: 1974
- Publication place: United States
- Media type: Print (hardcover)
- Pages: 245
- ISBN: 0-679-20289-7
- OCLC: 1168656

The Bladerunner (also published as The Blade Runner) is a 1974 science fiction novel by Alan E. Nourse, about underground medical services and smuggling. It was the source for the title, but no major plot elements, of the 1982 film Blade Runner, adapted from the novel Do Androids Dream of Electric Sheep? by Philip K. Dick, though elements of the Nourse novel recur in a pair of films also largely adapted from Dick's work, Impostor and Minority Report, released in 2001 and 2002, respectively.

== Plot ==
The novel's protagonist is Billy Gimp, a man with a club foot who runs "blades" for Doc (Doctor John Long) as part of an illegal black market for medical services. The setting is a society where free, comprehensive medical treatment is available for anyone so long as they qualify for treatment under the Eugenics Laws. Preconditions for medical care include sterilization, and no legitimate medical care is available for anyone who does not qualify or does not wish to undergo the sterilization procedure (including children over the age of five). These conditions have created illegal medical services in which bladerunners supply black market medical supplies for underground practitioners, who generally go out at night to see patients and perform surgery. As an epidemic breaks out among the underclass, Billy must save his city from the plague.

== Connection to the film Blade Runner ==
In 1979, William S. Burroughs was commissioned to write a treatment for a possible film adaptation. This was published as Blade Runner (a movie). Burroughs acknowledged the Nourse novel as a source, and prominently set a mutated virus and right-wing politics in the year 1999.

No film was produced from the Burroughs treatment, but Hampton Fancher, a screenwriter for the film based on Philip K. Dick's 1968 novel Do Androids Dream of Electric Sheep?, had a copy. He suggested "Blade Runner", as preferable to the earlier working titles "Android" and "Dangerous Days", for the Dick adaptation. The film, released as Blade Runner in 1982, has no plot connection to the Nourse and Burroughs stories. Ridley Scott bought any rights to the title Blade Runner that might have arisen from either the Nourse novel or the Burroughs treatment.

Two more of Dick's short stories, "Impostor" and "The Minority Report", were adapted into the films Impostor and Minority Report, in 2001 and 2002, respectively; both films heavily feature underground medical smuggling and procedures among an underclass, as in Nourse's novel, even though these elements are not present in either of the Dick short stories.
