= Martini Ranch =

American synth-pop band

- Genres: Synth-pop
- Years active: 1982–1989
- Labels: Sire; Warner Bros.
- Past members: Andrew Todd Rosenthal; Bill Paxton

Martini Ranch was an American synth-pop band conceived in 1982 by Andrew Todd Rosenthal. The band originally featured Rosenthal, Cliff Roman, and Steven William "Billy Bones" Fortuna. The later lineup was composed of Rosenthal (vocals and guitar) and actor Bill Paxton (voices and samples), and featured a similar sound to late 1980s Devo. The Martini Ranch track "How Can the Labouring Man Find Time for Self-Culture?" featured three members of Devo.

In 1988, Martini Ranch was featured in the opening title track of the film You Can't Hurry Love directed by Richard Martini (no relation). In 1989, Martini Ranch was featured in the end credits of Bill Paxton's cult movie Brain Dead.

Rosenthal later formed a new band called Swifty's Bazaar.

== History ==
=== Holy Cow ===
During the period of 1986 to 1988, Martini Ranch released two extended plays and one studio album. How Can the Labouring Man Find Time for Self-Culture? and Reach were released as EPs, with a follow-up album titled Holy Cow, all of which were released on Sire/Warner Bros. Records. The album was reissued in 2007 by Noble Rot. In 2010, Warner Special Products made Holy Cow available on iTunes.

The album includes guest appearances from Devo members Bob Casale, Alan Myers and Mark Mothersbaugh; Cindy Wilson of the B-52's, film composer Mark Isham; and actors Judge Reinhold and Bud Cort.

Though long out of print, following Bill Paxton's death Futurismo, Inc. released a vinyl reissue in May 2017. The package included a 180 gram green-and-white ("Ranch Dressing") LP pressing and DVD with videos for "Reach" (directed by James Cameron) and "How Can the Labouring Man Find Time for Self-Culture?" (directed by Rocky Schenck).

=== Everything You Hear is for Sale ===
Rosenthal recorded an album of a genre blend rooted in jazz-rock with friend Michael Sherwood. The band name was changed from Martini Ranch to Swifty's Bazaar and the album is titled Everything You Hear is for Sale; the album is available digitally.

=== Androgyne & Transformation ===
Rosenthal, as ANDY, released the album “ANDROGYNE” and "TRANSFORMATION" (Remastered) in 2020. New single by ANDY titled "GUEST SHUTTLE" is set to be released on January 1 2025.

== Music videos ==
=== "How Can the Labouring Man Find Time for Self-Culture?" ===
Directed by Rocky Schenck, Bill Paxton, and Andrew Rosenthal, the video mimics the dystopia of Fritz Lang's Metropolis and German Expressionism.

Aside from Rosenthal and Paxton, the cast of the video features cameos by actors associated with Paxton. Anthony Michael Hall, with whom Bill Paxton starred in the 1985 film Weird Science and Rick Rossovich, who appeared with Paxton in The Lords of Discipline, Streets of Fire and The Terminator, represent intellectual class and working-class men.

Other appearances include Michael Biehn (The Lords of Discipline and The Terminator) and Judge Reinhold (The Lords of Discipline).

=== "Reach" ===
Director James Cameron created the cowboy-themed video of "Reach." The production included cameos from his future wife, fellow director Kathryn Bigelow, as well as Aliens and The Terminator alumni Lance Henriksen, Paul Reiser and Jenette Goldstein. The cast also included Judge Reinhold, Brian Thompson, and Adrian Pasdar (the video is roughly contemporaneous with the production of Bigelow's Near Dark, the cast of which included Henricksen, Goldstein, and Pasdar as well as Paxton). Also seen is Bud Cort as the crazy person admiring Bill Paxton's motorcycle. There is also a scene with the band members being dragged through the dust. Three female bodybuilders Paxton knew from the gym also appeared: Dorothy Herndon (as a blacksmith) and Crista Videriksen and Val Streit (as bounty hunters from the cowgirl gang).

== Reception ==
Martini Ranch have drawn comparisons to Devo, the B-52's, and Oingo Boingo. Ira Robbins of Trouser Press described the band as a "wickedly inventive, visually oriented pop-culture nuthouse," labeling Holy Cow as "kinetic, silly, intelligent and infectious." AllMusic's William Cooper was also complimentary of the record, writing, "While the album's novelty approach wears thin, there's a surprising surplus of melody and songcraft... 'Labouring' and the catchy 'Hot Dog' are the two best tracks, and the rest of the album is surprisingly consistent." Cooper concluded, "Holy Cow is an acquired taste, but it still tastes pretty good.

== Discography ==
- Holy Cow (1988)
