= Alan E. Nourse =

American science fiction writer and physician

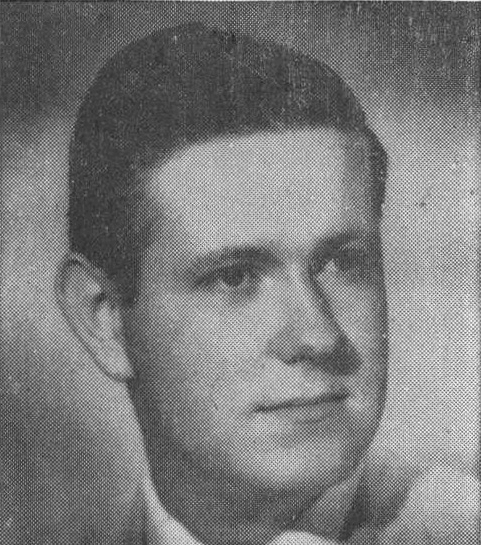
- Nourse c. 1954
- Born: Alan Edward Nourse; August 11, 1928; Des Moines, Iowa, U.S.
- Died: July 19, 1992 (aged 63); Thorp, Washington, U.S.
- Education: Rutgers University; University of Pennsylvania
- Occupations: Novelist, physician
- Spouse: Ann Morton (1952–?)
- Writing career
- Pen name: Doctor X
- Genre: Science fiction
- Subjects: Medicine, science

Alan Edward Nourse (/nɜːrs/; August 11, 1928 – July 19, 1992) was an American science fiction writer and physician. He wrote both juvenile and adult science fiction, as well as nonfiction works about medicine and science. His SF works sometimes focused on medicine and/or psionics.

His most notable pen name was Doctor X. He used this pseudonym when writing for a medical column in a science fiction magazine, allowing him to combine his expertise in medicine with his passion for science fiction.

== Biography ==
Alan Nourse was born August 11, 1928, to Benjamin and Grace (Ogg) Nourse in Des Moines, Iowa. He attended high school in Long Island, New York. He served in the U.S. Navy after World War II. He earned a Bachelor of Science degree in 1951 from Rutgers University in New Brunswick, New Jersey. He married Ann Morton on June 11, 1952, in Linden, New Jersey. He received a Doctor of Medicine (M.D.) degree in 1955 from the University of Pennsylvania. He served his one-year internship at Virginia Mason Hospital in Seattle and practiced medicine in North Bend, Washington, from 1958 to 1963 and also pursued his writing career.

He had helped pay for his medical education by writing science fiction for magazines. After retiring from medicine, he continued writing. His regular column in Good Housekeeping magazine earned him the nickname "Family Doctor".

He was a friend of fellow author Avram Davidson. Robert A. Heinlein dedicated his 1964 novel Farnham's Freehold to Nourse. Heinlein in part dedicated his 1982 novel Friday to Nourse's wife Ann.

His novel The Bladerunner lent its name to the Blade Runner movie, but no other aspects of its plot or characters (which were taken from Philip K. Dick's Do Androids Dream of Electric Sheep?). In the late 1970s an attempt to adapt The Bladerunner for the screen was made, with Beat Generation author William S. Burroughs commissioned to write a story treatment; no film was ever developed but the story treatment was later published as the novella Blade Runner (a movie).

Nourse died of unknown causes on July 19, 1992, in Thorp, Washington.

== Selected works ==
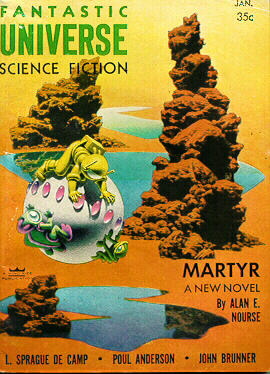
Nourse's novella Martyr was cover-featured on the January 1957 issue of Fantastic Universe

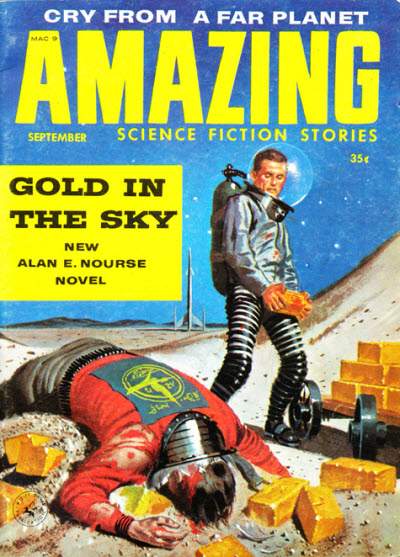
Nourse's novella Gold in the Sky was the cover story for the September 1958 issue of Amazing Stories

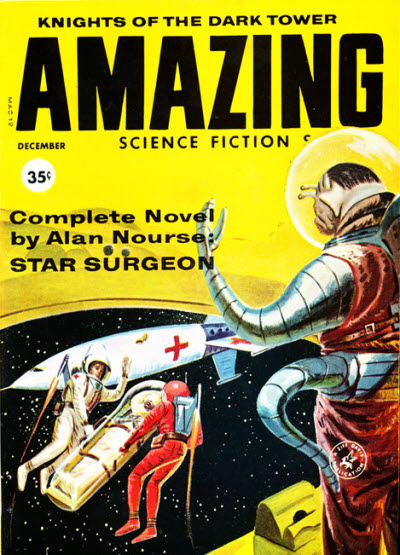
A novella-length version of Nourse's Star Surgeon was the cover story for the December 1959 issue of Amazing Stories

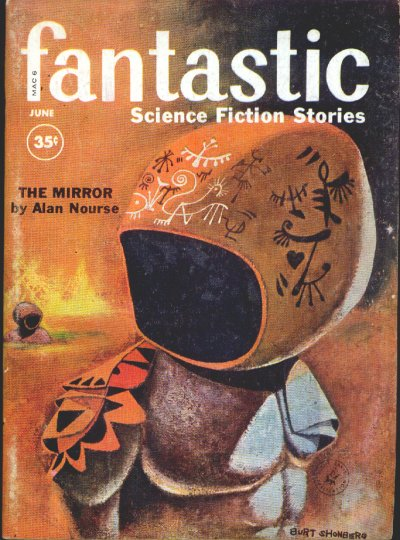
Nourse's novelette "The Mirror" was cover-featured on the June 1960 issue of Fantastic

=== Short stories ===
- "The Dark Door" (Galaxy, December 1953)
- "Brightside Crossing" (Galaxy, January 1956)
- "Problem" (Galaxy, October 1956)
- "Prime Difference" (Galaxy, June 1957)
- "Contamination Crew" (If, February 1958)
- "Mirror, Mirror" (1967)
- "The Counterfeit Man"
- "The Canvas Bag"
- "An Ounce of Cure"
- "Meeting of the Board"
- "Circus"
- "My Friend Bobby"
- "The Link"
- "Image of the Gods"
- "The Expert Touch"
- "Second Sight"

=== Novelettes ===
- "High Threshold" (published in the March 1951 issue of Astounding)
- "The Universe Between" (published in the September 1951 issue of Astounding)

=== Novels ===
- Trouble on Titan (1954)
- A Man Obsessed (1955)
- Rocket to Limbo (1957)
- Gold in the Sky (Novella, 1958)
- Scavengers in Space (1958, expanded from Gold in the Sky)
- The Invaders Are Coming! (1959, with co-author J. A. Meyer)
- Star Surgeon (1959)
- Raiders from the Rings (1962)
- The Universe Between (1965, a fix-up of "High Threshold" and "The Universe Between" )
- The Mercy Men (1968, revised version of A Man Obsessed)
- The Bladerunner (1974)
- The Practice (1978)
- The Fourth Horseman (1983)

=== Collections ===
- Tiger by the Tail and Other Science Fiction Stories (1961)
- The Counterfeit Man (1963)
- Psi-High and Others (1967)
- Rx for Tomorrow (1971)
- Short Works of Alan Edward Nourse (2008, reprint of seven of the stories from The Counterfeit Man)

=== Nonfiction books ===
- So You Want to Be a Doctor (1957)
- Nine Planets (1960, revised edition 1970)
- So You Want to Be a Nurse (1961)
- The Body (Life Science Library) (1965, revised edition 1981)
- Intern (1965, under the pseudonym Doctor X)
- Universe, Earth and Atom: The Story of Physics (1969)
- Venus and Mercury: A First Book (1972)
- The Backyard Astronomer (1973)
- The Giant Planets: A First Book (1974, revised edition 1982)
- The Asteroids: A First Book (1975)
- Viruses: A First Book (1976, revised edition 1982)
- Hormones: An Impact Book (1979)
- Herpes: An Impact Book (1985)
- AIDS: An Impact Book (1986)
- The Elk Hunt (1986)
- Teen Guide to Safe Sex (1990)
- Sexually Transmitted Diseases (1992)
- The Virus Invaders: A Venture Book (1992)
