= Tiger by the Tail and Other Science Fiction Stories =

1961 collection of stories by Alan E. Nourse

Tiger by the Tail
- Dust-jacket from the first edition
- Author: Alan E. Nourse
- Cover artist: Mel Hunter
- Language: English
- Genre: Science fiction
- Published: 1961 Donald McKay
- Publication place: United States
- Media type: Print (hardback)
- Pages: 184
- OCLC: 471802

Tiger by the Tail and Other Science Fiction Stories is the first collection of short works by Alan E. Nourse, issued in hardcover by publisher Donald McKay in 1961. It was reprinted in paperback by MacFadden Books in 1964 and 1968. A British hardcover edition was published by Dennis Dobson in 1962, with a paperback reprint, retitled Beyond Infinity, following from Corgi Books in 1964.

== Contents ==
- "Tiger by the Tail" (Galaxy 1951)
- "Nightmare Brother" (Astounding 1953)
- "PRoblem" (Galaxy 1956)
- "The Coffin Cure" (Galaxy 1957)
- "Brightside Crossing" (Galaxy 1956)
- "The Native Soil" (Fantastic Universe 1957)
- "Love Thy Vimp" (F&SF 1952)
- "Letter of the Law" (If 1954)
- "Family Resemblance" (Astounding 1953)

== Reception ==
Galaxy reviewer Floyd C. Gale rated the collection 4.5 stars out of five, declaring that "all nine of the stories rate fine to excellent and would be standouts in any company."
