= Confidence Bay =

Confidence Bay was the first mobile high-definition edit suite in the world. The facility was constructed within a 35' recreational vehicle with two full editing bays inside. It debuted in March 2006 at South by Southwest (SXSW) in Austin, Texas. It was created by Texas entrepreneurs Michael David (MD) Weis and Sam Crutsinger.

== Design philosophy ==
The interior of the truck was designed to focus on the comfort of the passengers instead of focusing on the technology. Most of the tech is hidden out of view with only the displays, keyboards, and such being visible. The vehicle has two slide-out compartments that expand the interior to 300 square feet (28 m^{2}). The custom cabinetry and counters were created by Gerry Burgess. The counter tops and several of the cabinets feature rounded edges which were created by steaming and bending the wood over time. The floor is covered with laminate hardwood flooring.

There's a video projector inside the RV that points to a dual-vision projection screen in front of a 16:9 aspect window in the side of the RV. At night the images projected onto the screen are visible to anybody standing outside the truck. This was designed to allow large groups of crew members to view footage without having to crowd into the truck.

The technology used in Confidence Bay is customized to the needs of the project. By default, the systems are multi-processor MacPro towers with Final Cut Studio, but the tech has been reconfigured in the past for AVID, Premiere, and Sony Vegas. The infrastructure is designed to work with any desktop platform.

== Power ==
The power system on Confidence Bay is a double conversion power system. Alternating Current (AC) power is fed into a high power battery charger that feeds 12 V direct current (DC) into 600 pounds (270 kg) of deep cycle marine batteries. Two 2000 W ProSine inverters use the power from the battery bank and feed pristine 120 V AC power to the two editing systems. This configuration completely isolates the sensitive electronics onboard from any spikes, sags, blackouts, or otherwise irregular power fluctuations that frequently occur when plugging into some generators or less than ideal electricity sources. This also allows the systems to remain up and fully functional while completely disconnected from any power source at all for close to an hour at moderate electrical load.

The truck does have a 5.5 kW gasoline generator which can run continuously for over 3 days if grid power is not available. The fuel supply is the 75 gallon gas tank used by the RV's engine. The generator will shut off when the gas gets down to 1/8 of a tank to prevent running the tank dry.

== Projects that have used Confidence Bay ==
=== Features ===
- Doonby
- Beyond the Farthest Star
- Carried Away
- Night Crawlers

=== Television ===
- Ghostbreakers (coming 2010)
- WFAA-TV

=== Web distribution ===
- MSN Video
- AOL Online
- AT&T Blue Room

=== Festivals ===
- San Diego Comic-Con (2008, 2009)
- New Orleans Jazz & Heritage Festival (2006, 2007, 2008, 2009)
- AFI-Dallas Film Festival (2007)
- Austin Film Festival (2007)
- Sasquatch Music Festival (2006)
- Newport Jazz Festival (2006)

=== Shorts ===
- Every Time a Bell Rings...
- On Second Thought
- Caching In
