= The Dresden Sun =

2026 American science fiction film

- Theatrical release poster
- Directed by: Michael Ryan
- Written by: Michael Ryan
- Produced by: Michael Ryan; Tyler Lockamy; Stuart Davis; Nathan Eaans; Benjamin Easterday; Jordan Paley
- Starring: Christina Ricci; Steven Ogg; Linus Roache; Samantha Win; Mena Suvari
- Edited by: Michael Ryan
- Music by: Alex Newport
- Production company: Archetype Pictures
- Distributed by: VMI Worldwide
- Release date: February 6, 2026
- Running time: 130 minutes
- Country: United States
- Language: English

The Dresden Sun is a 2026 American science fiction heist film written and directed by Michael Ryan. It is produced by Archetype Pictures, and stars Christina Ricci, Steven Ogg, Linus Roache, Samantha Win and Mena Suvari.

== Synopsis ==
A brilliant, principled mercenary with a traumatic past works on an inside job to steal "the sphere", a valued asset from Peredor Corporation, but the heist goes wrong. Meanwhile, The C & Earth corporation is hoping to use a scientist's project to gain dominance. Whilst an analyst at the powerful investment firm Mutual One is caught between deadly corporate rivals, financial fraud, technological espionage, and ends up on the run from a psychopathic military contractor.

== Cast ==
- Christina Ricci as Dr. Dresden Corliss
- Steven Ogg as Crilenger
- Linus Roache as Malik
- Mena Suvari as Asha
- Samantha Win as Z
- Aaron Craven as Kerry
- Louie Chapman as Ross Vilmore
- Richard Blackmon as Ethan Mason
- Del Eswar as Barrington Tran
- Brett Rickaby as Detective Holleran
- Terry Maratos as Counselor Brightmore
- Kevin Christopher as Taa Jansky
- Nicholas R. Camp as Harrison
- Chelsea London Lloyd as Megan

== Production ==
As well as writing and directing, Michael Ryan also produced the film alongside Tyler Lockamy at Archetype Pictures. Ryan described the film as allegory, which has themes including "corporatocracy, interdimensional reality, grief, arrested development, and apostasy."

=== Casting ===
Samantha Win was announced as playing Z in June 2021. In November 2021, Christina Ricci and Steven Ogg were revealed to have been cast as Dr. Dresden and mercenary Crilenger, respectively. In January 2022, Mena Suvari was added to the cast. A month later, Linus Roache was confirmed as Malik, a psychopathic military contractor.

=== Filming ===
Principal photography took place in Northern California from January 2022. Gabriel Horn was a consulting producer. Sabrina Jurisich, Shasta and Tehama Counties Film Commissioner, was reported to have remarked that the eight-week shoot was the largest single production to have ever been in Shasta County. Filming locations included Redding, the Redding Civic Auditorium and Redding City Hall.

Reportedly chosen in-part for its "scenic backdrops", Shasta County was said to have been chosen for 15 separate filming locations for the film.

== Release ==
Global sales on the picture are being handled by VMI Worldwide. After premiering in Redding on February 2, the film was released in limited theaters in California and Oregon on February 6, 2026.
