= Samantha Win =

Canadian actress and martial artist (born 1991)

- Born: March 29, 1991 (age 35); Barrie, Ontario, Canada
- Occupations: Actress; martial artist; stuntwoman
- Spouse: Allen Jo (m. 2011; div. 2019)

Samantha Win
Medal record

Representing Canada

Women's Wushu Taolu

World Championships
Bronze medal – third place	2007 Beijing	Nangun

Pan American Championships
Gold medal – first place	2006 Toronto	Nanquan
Gold medal – first place	2006 Toronto	Nandao
Gold medal – first place	2008 São Paulo	Nanquan
Silver medal – second place	2006 Toronto	Nangun

Samantha Win Tjhia (born March 29, 1991), formerly known as Samantha Jo, is a Canadian American actress, martial artist, stuntwoman and former wushu taolu athlete. After her competitive career, she turned to acting and in 2012, she debuted as an actress in the role of Kitana in Mortal Kombat: Legacy, followed by her role as Car-Vex in 2013's Man of Steel. She has appeared in various projects since, including a leading role as Chambers in Zack Snyder's 2021 film, Army of the Dead. She will also be starring in Michael Ryan's The Dresden Sun.

== Life and career ==
=== Early life ===
Win was born in Barrie, Ontario, to a Chinese Canadian family. She has trained in martial arts since the age of four as her mother was a black belt in jiu-jitsu herself, doing jiu-jitsu as well before turning to wushu when she turned 12. At this time she also modeled in several children's print ads for Sears Canada as well as appeared in various toy commercials. Win then became student of the Sunny Tang Martial Arts Center in Toronto and a member of the Newmarket based Team Ryouko Martial Arts performance team. She was a member of the Canadian National Wushu Team, and was a bronze medalist at the 2007 World Wushu Championships and a double gold-medalist Pan American Wushu Championships. She also competed in the 2008 Beijing Wushu Tournament. She was then recruited as a stuntwoman for Hollywood films because of her extensive training.

After moving to Los Angeles, Win continued her education by studying with acting teachers and even took to LA theater, performing the role of "Catherine" in Thursday Night Theater Company's production of Arthur Miller's A View from the Bridge. As of 2019, Win lived in Los Angeles and became an American citizen in 2023.

== Filmography ==
=== Acting credits ===
==== Films ====
- Man of Steel (2013) as Car-Vex
- Wonder Woman (2017) as Euboea
- Snow Steam Iron (2017) as Lin Woo
- Justice League (2017) as Euboea
- Circle of Stone (2018) as Padilla
- Zack Snyder's Justice League (2021) as Euboea
- Army of the Dead (2021) as Chambers
- The Dresden Sun (2026) as Z

==== Television ====
- Agent X (2015) (season 1) as Juju Yang
- Warrior (2015) (NBC Pilot) as Amelie
- Lethal Weapon (2019) (season 3) as Eve
- Arrow (2019) (season 7; episode: "You Have Saved This City") as Beatrice

==== Web series ====
- Mortal Kombat: Legacy (2011–2013) as Kitana

==== Video games ====
- Ninja Gaiden 3 (2012) as Ayane and Momiji (motion capture)
- Resident Evil 6 (2012)
- Call of Duty: Advanced Warfare (2017)

=== Stunt work ===
==== Films ====
- The King of Fighters (2010)
- Scott Pilgrim vs. the World (2010)
- In Time (2011)
- Sucker Punch (2011) - for Jena Malone (Rocket)
- Safe (2012)
- The Twilight Saga: Breaking Dawn – Part 2 (2012) - for Kristen Stewart (Bella Swan)
- Man of Steel (2013) - for Antje Traue (Faora)
- 300: Rise of an Empire (2014) - for Eva Green (Artemisia)

==== Television ====
- Aaron Stone (2009) (episodes: "Saturday Fight Fever" and "Hunt Me? Hunt You!")
- Supah Ninjas (2011) (episode: "Morningstar Academy")
- Suburgatory (2013) (episode: "Apocalypse Meow")
- Marvel's Agents of S.H.I.E.L.D. (2014)
