= The Presidio (film) =

1988 film by Peter Hyams

- Theatrical release poster
- Directed by: Peter Hyams
- Written by: Larry Ferguson
- Produced by: D. Constantine Conte
- Starring: Sean Connery; Mark Harmon; Meg Ryan; Jack Warden
- Cinematography: Peter Hyams
- Edited by: Diane Adler; Beau Barthel-Blair; James Mitchell
- Music by: Bruce Broughton
- Distributed by: Paramount Pictures
- Release date: June 10, 1988
- Running time: 97 minutes
- Country: United States
- Language: English
- Box office: $51 million

The Presidio is a 1988 American crime action thriller film shot and directed by Peter Hyams and starring Sean Connery and Mark Harmon.

== Plot ==
At the Presidio Army base in San Francisco, US Military Police soldier Patti Jean Lynch is shot dead while investigating a break-in and two San Francisco Police Department officers are killed in the getaway. Jay Austin, an SFPD Detective and an ex-Military Police soldier, is sent to investigate. He clashes with Lieutenant Colonel Alan Caldwell, the base provost marshal.

Years earlier, Austin and Lynch were partners while serving as MPs and Caldwell was their commanding officer. When Austin arrested Lieutenant Colonel Paul Lawrence for drunk driving and assaulted him after insulting Lynch, Caldwell did not support him. In the aftermath, Austin was demoted and decided to leave the Army.

The investigation casts suspicion on Lawrence, as Lynch was killed with a Tokarev 7.62mm pistol. Lawrence is the registered owner of a Tokarev, but claims he lost it in a poker game. Austin also learns that the getaway car used by Lynch's killer was registered to a civilian named Arthur Peale, who is wealthy and owns a holding company.

Austin tries to question Lawrence about the Tokarev, but Caldwell intervenes. Recognizing that they have shared jurisdiction on the case, they uneasily team up to investigate. Caldwell states that if the Tokarev bullet that killed Lynch were to match a bullet fired earlier from Lawrence's Tokarev at the Presidio firing range, then Caldwell will arrange for Lawrence to surrender to Austin. In the meantime, Caldwell and Austin visit Peale, who claims his car was stolen and has an alibi for the night Lynch was shot. Caldwell sees Vietnam-era paraphernalia in Peale's office. Caldwell learns that Peale was previously in the CIA and a military advisor in Vietnam at the same time Lawrence was there.

Austin gets the ballistics report back on the Tokarev, which confirms that Lawrence's gun killed Lynch. Austin corners Lawrence when he leaves the Presidio, resulting in a foot chase through Chinatown. Lawrence is then killed in a hit and run. Caldwell is furious that Austin disregarded their agreement. Caldwell confides in his friend, retired Sergeant Major Ross Maclure, who served with Caldwell in Vietnam.

Caldwell and Austin both figure out that the killer at the Presidio was trying to break into a storeroom to retrieve a bottle of spring water. Following the lead to the water company, Austin gets the name of the delivery driver, George Spota. Caldwell recognizes the name as someone who served under Lawrence in Vietnam. Austin confirms that Spota's car hit and killed Lawrence during their foot chase, and Caldwell learns that the water company Spota works for is owned by Peale. Austin and Caldwell follow Spota during his deliveries. Spota makes a delivery to Travis Air Force Base and picks up a water bottle that was transported to the base from the Philippines.

Austin and Caldwell see the conspiracy come together. Spota, Lawrence, and Peale all knew each other in Vietnam. Spota picked up a delivery of water from the Philippines, but accidentally left that water bottle in the storeroom at the Presidio. When he realized his mistake, he went back to retrieve it, but Lynch surprised him during the break-in, and he shot her.

Just as they figure this out, they see Maclure drive up. Caldwell realizes that Peale and Lawrence would have needed someone like Maclure to carry out the smuggling, because Maclure had contacts in the US military in Asia. Spota and Peale open the bottle that came from the Philippines, revealing diamonds inside, hidden in the clear water. Maclure comes in and surprises them by pulling a gun. Peale reveals that Lawrence was blackmailing Maclure. Peale tries to convince Maclure to let the smuggling operation continue, but Maclure is disgusted and heartbroken over the death of Lynch. He says the smuggling must stop, but then is stripped of his gun by Peale's men. Just as Peale is about to kill Maclure, Caldwell and Austin enter. A gunfight ensues during which Peale and his men are killed and Maclure is fatally wounded.

Caldwell asks Austin to delay his police report by 48 hours to give Caldwell time to bury Maclure with his honor intact. Austin agrees. At a military funeral, Caldwell tearfully eulogizes Maclure. Caldwell reconciles with his daughter Donna, who is developing a mutual attraction with Austin, and grudgingly admits Austin into the family.

== Cast ==
- Sean Connery as Lt. Colonel Alan Caldwell
- Mark Harmon as Jay Austin
- Meg Ryan as Donna Caldwell
- Jack Warden as Sgt. Major Ross Maclure
- Mark Blum as Arthur Peale
- Marvin J. McIntyre as M.P., Zeke
- Dana Gladstone as Colonel Paul Lawrence
- Jenette Goldstein as Patti Jean Lynch
- James Hooks Reynolds as George Spota

== Reception ==
=== Critical response ===
The Presidio received generally negative reviews from critics. On the review aggregator website Rotten Tomatoes, 41% of 32 critics' reviews are positive, with an average rating of 5.2/10. The website's consensus reads: "The Presidio is too well-cast and competently directed to be truly painful, but action fans have no shortage of more compelling options." Metacritic, which uses a weighted average, assigned the film a score of 31 out of 100, based on 11 critics, indicating "generally unfavorable" reviews.

=== Box office ===
The Presidio debuted at number four in the domestic box office, behind ongoing hits Crocodile Dundee II and Big, as well as fellow new release Big Business. It grossed a total of $20.3 million in the United States and Canada and $31.6 million in other territories, for a worldwide total of $51.9 million.
