= Taking Tiger Mountain (film) =

- Promotional release poster
- Directed by: Tom Huckabee; Kent Smith
- Written by: Paul Cullum; Tom Huckabee; Kent Smith
- Based on: Blade Runner (a movie) by William S. Burroughs
- Starring: Bill Paxton
- Distributed by: Horizon Films
- Release date: March 24, 1983 (San Francisco)
- Running time: 96 minutes
- Country: United States
- Language: English

Taking Tiger Mountain is a 1983 American science fiction film directed by Tom Huckabee and Kent Smith, and starring Bill Paxton in one of his earliest on-screen acting roles. Originally conceived as an experimental art film inspired by Albert Camus's 1942 novel The Stranger and a poem by Smith, the film was initially directed by Smith and shot in Wales. Aside from Paxton, the film's cast is made up of townspeople from the areas in which shooting took place. It was filmed without sound, with the intention of adding dialogue in post-production.

During post-production, Huckabee took over as the film's director, abandoning Smith's original concept and instead loosely basing the film on the 1979 novella Blade Runner (a movie) by William S. Burroughs. The film premiered on March 24, 1983. Over three decades later, Huckabee re-edited the film and released it as an alternate cut titled Taking Tiger Mountain Revisited.

== Production ==
In 1973, Kent Smith wrote a poem about the kidnapping of John Paul Getty III, which was loosely adapted as the initial script for Taking Tiger Mountain. Smith also drew inspiration from the 1942 novel The Stranger by Albert Camus.

Smith, who worked as an employee at Encyclopædia Britannica Films with actor Bill Paxton, journeyed with Paxton and University of Texas at Austin student Tom Huckabee to Morocco in 1974 to begin shooting the film. They brought with them leftover film stock from the film Lenny, as well as a leased Arriflex Techniscope camera and "probably a tripod", and intended to film in the city of Tangier. However, they lost equipment at Charles de Gaulle Airport in France, and by the time they reached Tangier, they were arrested and their remaining equipment impounded because they had not paid the Moroccan authorities' baksheesh. After being bailed out of jail by Smith, they were deported to Gibraltar, and proceeded to drive to South Wales, where Paxton was once a foreign exchange student, and filmed there.

Paxton's co-stars were residents of the towns in Wales where the film was shot, rather than professional actors. The film was shot in black-and-white and without sound, with the intention of having dialogue be dubbed in later. In 1979, Huckabee leased the footage from Smith to turn it into a film. Huckabee and Paxton decided to abandon the initial idea based on the Getty kidnapping, and enlisted the help of Paul Cullum to change the script. According to Huckabee, author William S. Burroughs was "giving away [his] stories to any film student or amateur that wrote him a letter" around that time, and so Huckabee paid Burroughs $100 for the rights to Burroughs' novella Blade Runner (a movie).

== Nudity and sex ==
A groundbreaking feature of this film is that it employs frontal female and male nudity and graphic sexual activity presented as entirely consensual and mutually pleasurable. This is accomplished throughout in whole scenes and vignettes usually with dispassionate narrative overlay about social-psychological matters. Such graphic material, ubiquitously found in pornographic films, is rarely featured in those outside of that industry. Indeed, a naturally occurring penis, flaccid or erect, is atypical in Hollywood productions.

== Release ==
Taking Tiger Mountain premiered at the Roxie Theater in San Francisco, California on March 24, 1983. It was screened at the Inwood Theatre in Dallas, Texas that same year.

== Taking Tiger Mountain Revisited ==
In 2016, film restoration and distribution company Vinegar Syndrome contacted Huckabee with an offer to digitally remaster and release Taking Tiger Mountain on home video. Huckabee accepted the offer, and re-edited the film to create an alternate cut known as Taking Tiger Mountain Revisited. Changes in this version include on-screen graphics having been replaced with digital text, the addition of computer-generated rain and lens flares, and a different ending that features color footage shot on an iPhone.

== Critical reception ==
Upon release, Taking Tiger Mountain received some positive reception. However, Joe Leydon of the Houston Post gave the film a negative review. Similarly, a critic writing for The Dallas Morning News called the film "Murky, meandering, and mind-numbingly pretentious".

In a retrospective assessment, Andrew Todd of Polygon referred to the film as being "about as coherent as you'd expect a movie built out of 60 minutes of silent footage to be, but it's designed to be watched emotionally or sensorially rather than narratively." He called it "a testament to the power of post-production to change the entire meaning of footage, adding context that simply wasn't there to begin with." Regarding the 2016 Revisited cut of the film, Todd wrote that it is "filled with pointless and embarrassing additions", and that "[Huckabee's] attempts to 'fix' the movie make it substantially worse."

Conversely, Michael Hall of Texas Monthly wrote positively of the Revisited cut, calling it "a beautiful tangle of images and sound, with sinister, oscillating music [...] and a blanketing sense of doom." He also commended Paxton's performance as "spellbinding and funny".

== Home media ==
In June 2019, Vinegar Syndrome released a 4K restoration of Taking Tiger Mountain, along with Taking Tiger Mountain Revisited, on DVD and Blu-ray.
