= Near Dark =

1987 film directed by Kathryn Bigelow

- Theatrical release poster
- Directed by: Kathryn Bigelow
- Written by: Eric Red; Kathryn Bigelow
- Produced by: Steven-Charles Jaffe
- Starring: Adrian Pasdar; Jenny Wright; Lance Henriksen; Bill Paxton; Jenette Goldstein; Tim Thomerson
- Cinematography: Adam Greenberg
- Edited by: Howard E. Smith
- Music by: Tangerine Dream
- Production company: F/M Entertainment
- Distributed by: De Laurentiis Entertainment Group
- Release dates: September 12, 1987 (TIFF); October 2, 1987 (United States)
- Running time: 95 minutes
- Country: United States
- Language: English
- Budget: $5 million
- Box office: $3.4 million

Near Dark is a 1987 American neo-Western horror film co-written and directed by Kathryn Bigelow (in her solo directorial debut), and starring Adrian Pasdar, Jenny Wright, Bill Paxton, Lance Henriksen and Jenette Goldstein. The plot follows a young man in a small Oklahoma town who becomes involved with a family of nomadic American vampires.

Despite performing poorly at the box office, critic reviews were generally positive. Over the years, the film has gained a cult following.

== Plot ==
One night, Caleb Colton, a young man in a small Oklahoma town, meets an attractive young drifter named Mae. Just before sunrise, she bites him on the neck and runs off. The rising sun causes Caleb's flesh to smoke and burn. Mae arrives with a group of roaming vampires in an RV and takes him away. The most psychotic of the vampires, Severen, wants to kill Caleb but Mae reveals that she has already turned him. Their charismatic leader, Jesse Hooker, reluctantly agrees to allow Caleb to remain with them for a week to see if he can learn to hunt and gain the group's trust. Caleb is unwilling to kill to feed, which alienates him from the others. To protect him, Mae kills for him and then has him drink from her wrist.

Jesse's group enters a bar and kills the occupants. They set the bar on fire and flee the scene. All except Mae want to kill Caleb after he endangers them by letting the only living occupant escape, but after Caleb endangers himself to help them escape their motel room during a daylight police raid, Jesse and the others are grateful and temporarily mollified. A camaraderie commences, with Caleb asking Jesse how old he is and Jesse responding that he "fought for the South" (during the American Civil War), making him about 150 years old (Severen had earlier suggested he and Jesse started the Great Chicago Fire of 1871).

Meanwhile, Caleb's father has been searching for Jesse's group. A child vampire in the group, Homer, meets Caleb's sister, Sarah, and wants to turn her into his companion, but Caleb objects. While the group argues, Caleb's father arrives and holds them at gunpoint, demanding that Sarah be released. Jesse taunts him into shooting him, then regurgitates the bullet before wrestling the gun away. In the confusion, Sarah opens a door, letting in the sunlight and forcing the vampires back. Burning, Caleb escapes with his family.

Caleb suggests they try giving him a blood transfusion. The transfusion unexpectedly reverses Caleb's transformation. That night, the vampires search for Caleb and Sarah. Mae distracts Caleb by trying to persuade him to return to her while the others kidnap his sister. Caleb discovers the kidnapping and his tires slashed but gives chase on horseback. When the horse shies and throws him, he is confronted by Severen. Caleb commandeers a tractor-trailer and runs Severen over. The injured vampire suddenly appears on the hood of the truck and manages to rip apart the wiring in the engine. Caleb jackknifes the vehicle and jumps out as the truck explodes, killing Severen. Seeking revenge, Jesse and his girlfriend, Diamondback, pursue him but are forced to escape in their car as dawn breaks.

Attempting to save Sarah, Mae breaks out of the back of the car with her. Mae's flesh begins to smoke as she is burned by the sun but she carries Sarah into Caleb's arms, taking refuge under his jacket. Homer attempts to follow, but as he runs he dies from exposure to the sun. Their sunproofing ruined, Jesse and Diamondback also begin to burn. They attempt to run Caleb and Sarah over but fail, dying as the car blows up. Mae awakens later, her burns now healed. She too has been given a transfusion and is cured. Mae says she is afraid, and Caleb pulls her into a hug to comfort her as the film ends.

== Cast ==
- Adrian Pasdar as Caleb Colton
- Jenny Wright as Mae
- Lance Henriksen as Jesse Hooker
- Bill Paxton as Severen
- Jenette Goldstein as Diamondback
- Joshua John Miller as Homer
- Marcie Leeds as Sarah Colton
- Tim Thomerson as Loy Colton
- Troy Evans as Plainclothes Police Officer
- Roger Aaron Brown as Cajun Truck Driver
- James LeGros as Teenage Cowboy
- Billy Beck as Motel Manager
- S.A. Griffin as Police Officer at Motel
- Neith Hunter as Lady in Truck
- Theresa Randle as Lady in Truck

== Production ==
Near Dark was part of a resurgence of American vampire films in the 1980s, along with the likes of Fright Night, Once Bitten (both 1985), Vamp (1986), The Lost Boys and The Monster Squad (both 1987). Director and co-writer Kathryn Bigelow wanted to film a Western movie; when she and fellow co-writer Eric Red found financial backing for a Western difficult to obtain, they decided to mix the Western genre with the then more popular vampire genre. The combination of the genres, which Bigelow and Red felt were ripe for revisionist interpretation, had been visited at least twice before on the big screen, with Curse of the Undead (1959) and Billy the Kid Versus Dracula (1966).

Bigelow knew (and later married) director James Cameron, who directed Aliens (1986), a film that shares three cast members (Paxton, Goldstein and Henriksen) with Near Dark. Actor Michael Biehn was offered the role of Jesse Hooker, but he rejected the role, because he found the script confusing. Lance Henriksen took over the role. A cinema seen in the background early in the film has Aliens on its marquee and Cameron played the man who "flips off" Severen.

== Soundtrack ==
Near Dark is the thirty-second major release and tenth soundtrack album by Tangerine Dream. It was released in 1988.

Near Dark

Soundtrack album by Tangerine Dream
- Released: 1988
- Recorded: 1987
- Genre: Electronic
- Label: Varèse Sarabande

Tangerine Dream chronology
Three O'Clock High (1987)	Near Dark (1988)	Shy People (1988)

Near Dark (Original Motion Picture Soundtrack)
No.	Title	Length
1.	"Caleb's Blues"	3:10
2.	"Pick up at High Noon"	4:56
3.	"Rain in the Third House"	2:56
4.	"Bus Station"	8:38
5.	"Good Times"	2:35
6.	"She's My Sister (Resurrection 1)"	7:20
7.	"Mae Comes Back"	2:00
8.	"Father and Son (Resurrection 2)"	2:55
9.	"Severin Dies"	2:45
10.	"Fight at Dawn"	4:40
11.	"Mae's Transformation"	4:20
Total length:		46:15

== Release ==
Near Dark premiered at the Toronto International Film Festival (TIFF) on September 12, 1987.

=== Box office ===
Near Dark was released on October 2, 1987, in 262 theaters, grossing US$635,789 on its opening weekend. In its second week, the film's release widened to 429 screens. Near Dark went on to make $3.4 million, below its $5 million budget.

Bigelow has since attributed the film's lack of box-office success to its proximity to The Lost Boys—which was released two months prior to Near Dark, opening on a comparatively wider 1,542 screens—as well as it being an independent film. She has stated that The Lost Boys was a "vampire movie made by Warner Bros. that had a tremendous amount of muscle behind it, distribution and marketing muscle behind it. And so we were just this little [...] whisper out there."

=== Home media ===
Near Dark was released on VHS in 1988. By 1989, the film was released on LaserDisc by HBO Video. In 2002, Anchor Bay Entertainment released the film on DVD. This one is a THX certified two-disc release that features a DTS 5.1 audio track, an audio commentary, a documentary, theatrical trailers, galleries and DVD-ROM. In November 2009, the film was released on Blu-ray by Lionsgate Home Entertainment.

== Reception ==
Part of a late 1980s revival of serious vampire depictions on the big screen, it received mostly positive reviews for its mix of the Western, biker and vampire movie genres. On the review aggregator website Rotten Tomatoes, Near Dark holds an 81% approval rating based on 79 critic reviews. The consensus reads: "Near Dark is at once a creepy vampire film, a thrilling western, and a poignant family tale, with humor and scares in abundance."

=== Critical response ===
In her review for The New York Times, Caryn James wrote, "Ms. Bigelow's too-studied compositions – Caleb in silhouette riding a horse toward the camera – clash with her unstudied approach to the characters' looks". Jonathan Rosenbaum of the Chicago Reader was impressed by Bigelow's first foray into big budget films with the "hillbilly vampire" movie, describing it as "beautifully shot". Hal Hinson of The Washington Post said the intermixing of vampire legends, westerns and biker movies has a result that is "both outrageous and poetic; it has extravagant, bloody thrills plus something else – something that comes close to genuine emotion". In his review for The Globe and Mail, Jay Scott wrote, "Bill Paxton as the undead sex symbol – is exceptional, but not exceptional enough to put across the cop-out that concludes the film".

Later in 2007, Jim Hoberman would write in The Village Voice that "Bigelow has made bigger movies than [Near Dark], but none better," calling it "a poetic horror film that draws its power from the outlaw mythology of Bonnie and Clyde and Gun Crazy (or maybe the Manson Family), and its brooding loneliness from the western landscape. Nothing I’ve seen in the 20 years since Near Dark appeared has so successfully Americanized the myth of the vampire." Richard Corliss of Time magazine would also call Near Dark "weird (and) beautiful" and "the all-time teenage vampire love story". Richard Schickel (also of Time) considered the film a clever variant of the vampire film genre. Peter Travers of Rolling Stone concurred, calling it "gory and gorgeous". Alan Jones of Radio Times awarded it four stars out of five, calling it a "1980s horror landmark" and "one of the best vampire movies ever made." Jones described it as a "visually stunning and frightening package, spinning a genuinely scary tale" and highlighted the "stand-out degenerate performances" of Henriksen and Paxton.

== Remake plans ==
A remake of the film was announced in October 2006 as a co-production between film companies Rogue Pictures and Platinum Dunes, with Samuel Bayer attached to direct. In December 2008, Platinum Dunes producer Brad Fuller stated that the project had been put on hold due to similarities in conception with Twilight (2008), a film which also contained a romance between human and vampire characters.

In October 2026 it was reported that A24 are planning to produce a television series remake of the film.

== See also ==
- List of cult films
