= Bill Paxton =

American actor (1955–2017)

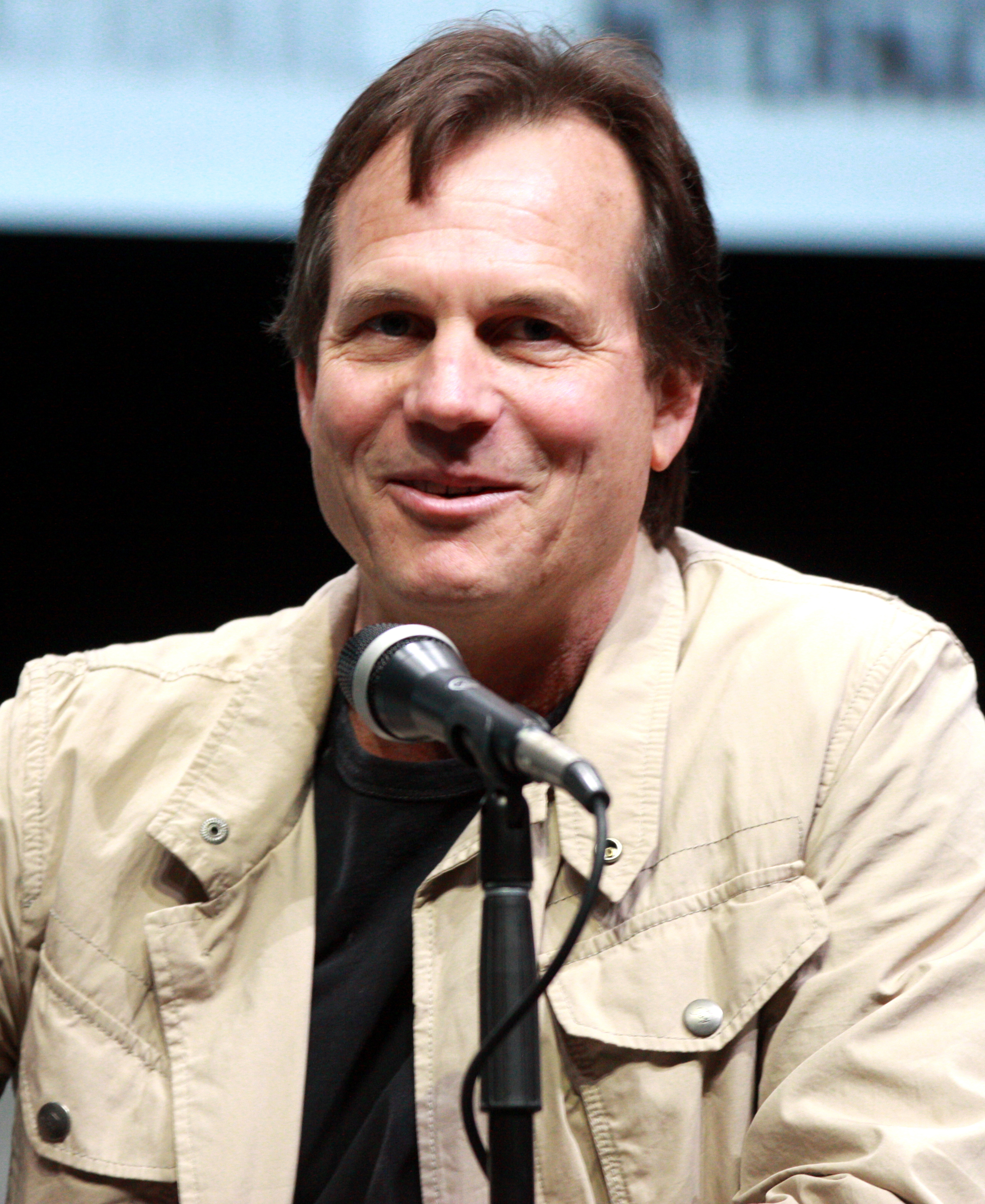
- Paxton at the 2013 San Diego Comic-Con
- Born: William Paxton; May 17, 1955; Fort Worth, Texas, U.S.
- Died: February 25, 2017 (aged 61); Los Angeles, California, U.S.
- Resting place: Forest Lawn Memorial Park, Hollywood Hills, California, U.S.
- Occupations: Actor; filmmaker; musician
- Years active: 1975–2017
- Spouses: Kelly Rowan (m. 1979; div. 1980); Louise Newbury (m. 1987)
- Children: 2, including James
- Relatives: Elisha F. Paxton (great-great-grandfather)
- Musical career
- Genres: New wave; electronic; synth-pop; comedy rock
- Instruments: Vocals; samples
- Formerly of: Martini Ranch

William Paxton (May 17, 1955 – February 25, 2017) was an American actor, filmmaker and musician. A versatile character actor known for his distinctive Texan drawl and everyman screen persona, he was a four-time Golden Globe Award and a Primetime Emmy Award nominee, among other accolades.

Paxton starred in films Near Dark (1987), Tombstone (1993), Apollo 13 (1995), Twister (1996), Mighty Joe Young (1998), A Simple Plan (1998), U-571 (2000), Vertical Limit (2000) and played supporting roles in Weird Science (1985), Predator 2 (1990), Edge of Tomorrow (2014), and Nightcrawler (2014). He was a close collaborator of director James Cameron, appearing in his films The Terminator (1984), Aliens (1986), True Lies (1994), and Titanic (1997). He made his directorial debut with the 2001 horror film Frailty, in which he also starred, earning him Saturn Award nominations for Best Director and Best Horror Film.

On television, Paxton starred as Bill Henrickson on the HBO drama series Big Love (2006–2011), for which he earned three Golden Globe nominations for Best Actor – Television Series Drama during the show's run. He was nominated for an Emmy Award and a Screen Actors Guild Award for portraying Randall McCoy in the History Channel miniseries Hatfields & McCoys (2012).

== Early life ==
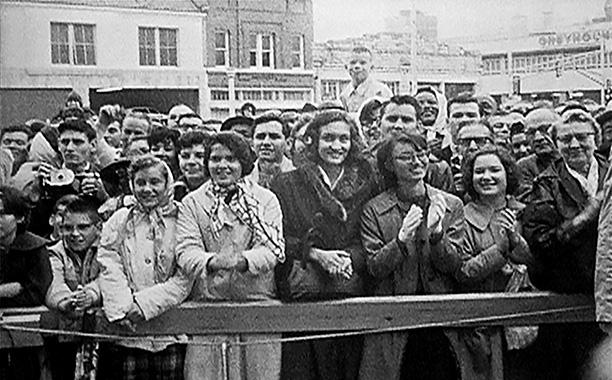
Paxton being raised above the crowd as a child as President Kennedy emerges from the Hotel Texas before his assassination in November 1963

William Paxton was born in Fort Worth, Texas, on May 17, 1955, the son of Mary Lou (née Gray; 1926–2016) and John Lane Paxton (1920–2011). His mother was a Catholic who raised him and his siblings in her faith. His father was a businessman, lumber wholesaler, museum executive, and (during his son's career) an occasional actor, notably appearing in Sam Raimi's Spider-Man films as Bernard Houseman and alongside Paxton in A Simple Plan (1998). His great-great-grandfather was Elisha Franklin Paxton (1828–1863), a brigadier general in the Confederate Army during the Civil War who was killed commanding the Stonewall Brigade at the Battle of Chancellorsville.

Paxton is distantly related to actress Sara Paxton and was the great-nephew of Mary Paxton Keeley, a prominent journalist and close friend of Bess Truman. At the age of eight, he was in the crowd when President John F. Kennedy emerged from the Hotel Texas in Fort Worth on the morning of his assassination on November 22, 1963. Photographs of Paxton being lifted above the crowd are on display at the Sixth Floor Museum at Dealey Plaza in Dallas, Texas. He later co-produced the film Parkland about the assassination. He graduated from Arlington Heights High School in Fort Worth in 1973, after which he studied at Richmond College in London, alongside his old high-school friend Danny Martin. There, they met fellow Texas native Tom Huckabee, with whom they made Super 8 short films for which they built their own sets. One of Paxton's first lead roles was in Huckabee's experimental film Taking Tiger Mountain. Paxton subsequently moved to Los Angeles, where he worked in props and art departments and as a parking valet at the Beverly Hills Hotel. After being rejected by film schools in Southern California, he switched his ambitions from directing to acting.

== Career ==
=== Acting and filmmaking ===
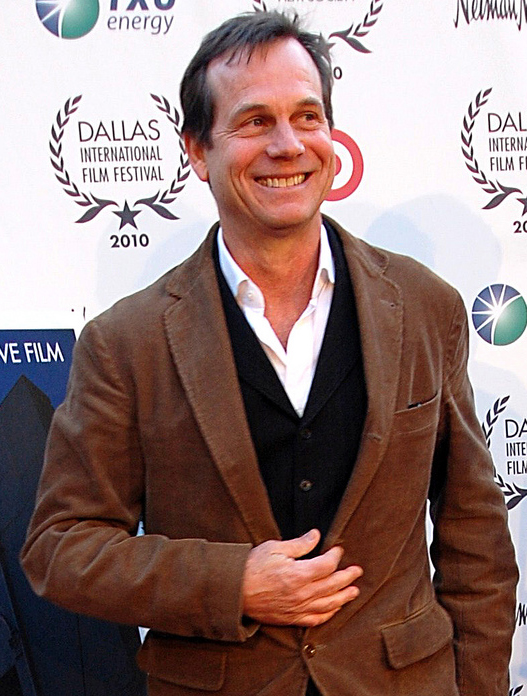
Paxton in April 2010

Among Paxton's earliest roles were as a mortuary assistant in Mortuary (1983), a minor role as a punk in The Terminator (1984), a minor role as a bartender in Streets of Fire, a supporting role as the lead protagonist's bullying older brother Chet Donnelly in John Hughes's Weird Science (1985), and Private William Hudson in Aliens (1986).

He directed several short films, including the music video for Barnes & Barnes's novelty song "Fish Heads", which aired during Saturday Night Live's low-rated 1980–81 season and was in heavy rotation during the early days of Canadian music channel MuchMusic. He was cast in a music video for the 1982 Pat Benatar song "Shadows of the Night" in which he appeared as a Nazi radio officer.

In 1981, Paxton played a soldier in the movie Stripes in the bar scene with John Candy and Bill Murray.

He worked alongside Arnold Schwarzenegger in The Terminator (1984) and in Commando (1985), as well as in True Lies (1994), which reunited him with James Cameron. He reunited with Cameron on Aliens (1986). His performance in the latter film as Private Hudson earned him the Saturn Award for Best Supporting Actor.

He also appeared in Weird Science (1985). In 1987, Paxton played the most psychotic of the vampires, Severen, in Kathryn Bigelow's critically acclaimed neo-Western horror film Near Dark.

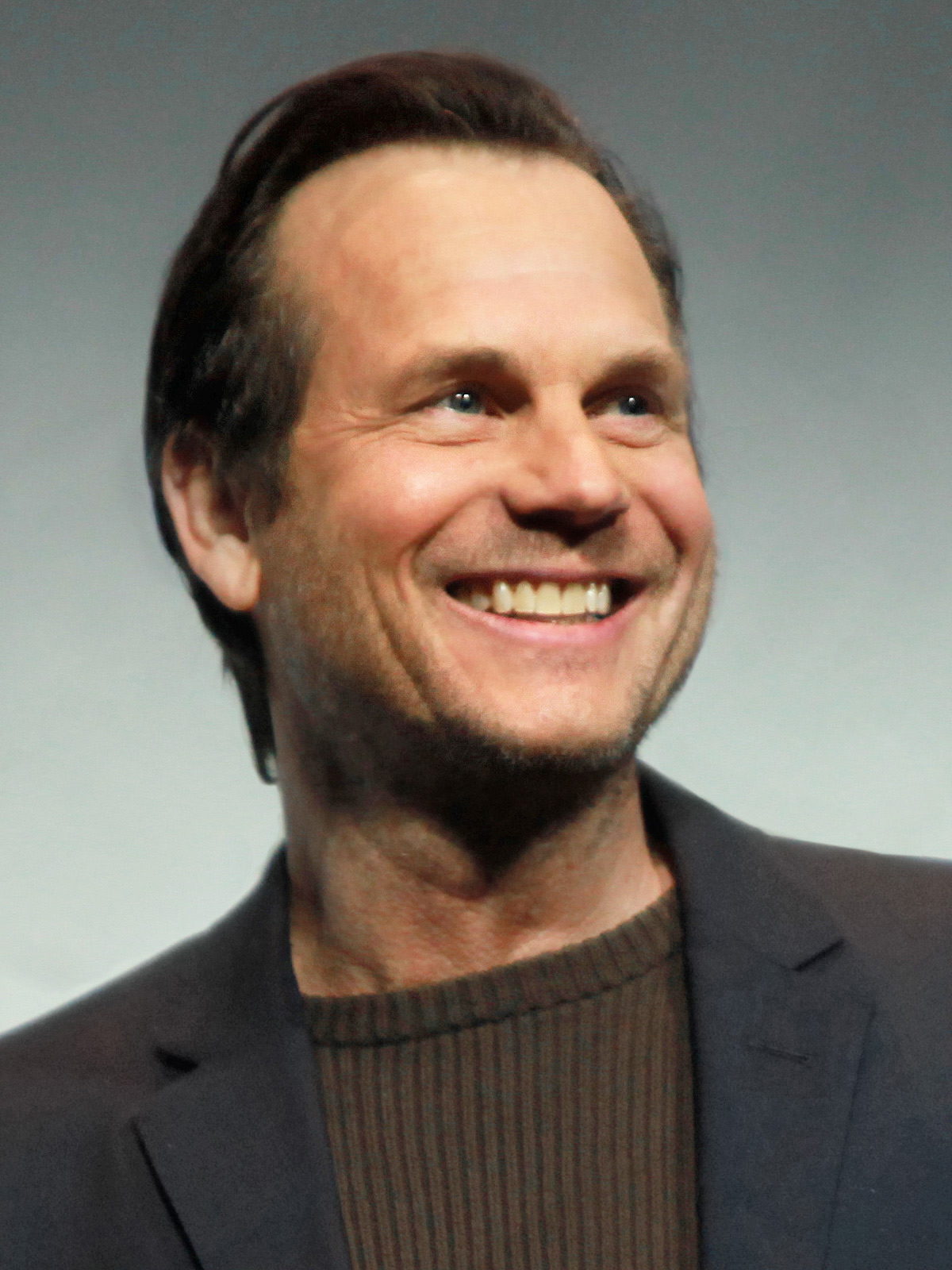
Paxton in April 2014

In 1990, Paxton appeared in Predator 2 (1990). He collaborated with James Cameron again on Titanic (1997), which was the highest-grossing film of all time at its release. In his other roles, Paxton played Morgan Earp in Tombstone (1993), Fred Haise in Apollo 13 (1995), Bill Harding in Twister (1996), and lead roles in dark dramas such as One False Move (1992) and A Simple Plan (1998). In 1990, he co-starred with Charlie Sheen and Michael Biehn in Navy Seals.

Paxton also appeared in Indian Summer (1993) and Mighty Joe Young (1998). After 2000, he appeared in U-571 (2000), Vertical Limit (2000), Frailty (2001), Broken Lizard's Club Dread (2004), Thunderbirds (2004), Edge of Tomorrow (2014) and Nightcrawler (2014).

Paxton directed the feature films Frailty (2001), in which he also starred, and The Greatest Game Ever Played (2005). Four years after appearing in Titanic, he joined Cameron on an expedition to the wreck of the Titanic. A film about this trip, Ghosts of the Abyss, was released in 2003. He also appeared in the music video for Limp Bizkit's 2003 song "Eat You Alive" as a sheriff. In addition, Paxton also played a character in both Spy Kids 2 and Spy Kids 3-D.

Paxton starred in "A Bright Shining Lie" (HBO 1998), an American war drama television film written and directed by Terry George, based on Neil Sheehan's 1988 book of the same name and the true story of John Paul Vann's experience in the Vietnam War.

His highest-profile television performances received much positive attention, including his lead role in HBO's Big Love (2006–2011), for which Paxton received three Golden Globe Award nominations. He also received positive reviews for his performance in the History Channel's miniseries Hatfields & McCoys (2012), for which he was nominated for an Emmy Award alongside co-star Kevin Costner.

In 2014, he played the role of the villainous John Garrett in Agents of S.H.I.E.L.D., and a supporting role in Edge of Tomorrow (2014). He starred alongside Jon Bernthal, Rose McGowan and John Malkovich as a playable character in the 2014 video game Call of Duty: Advanced Warfare (downloadable "Exo Zombies" mode). Paxton starred as General Sam Houston in the Western miniseries Texas Rising for The History Channel in 2015. In February 2016, Paxton was cast as Detective Frank Rourke for Training Day, a crime-thriller television series set 15 years after the events of the eponymous 2001 movie. It premiered a year later. His final film appearance was in The Circle (2017), released two months after his death.

=== Music ===
In 1982, Paxton and his friend Andrew Todd Rosenthal formed a new wave musical band called Martini Ranch. The band released its only full-length album, Holy Cow, in 1988 on Sire Records. The album was produced by Devo member Bob Casale, and featured guest appearances by two other members of that band. The music video for the band's single "Reach" was directed by James Cameron. In 2018, his performances as Peter "Coconut Pete" Wabash in Broken Lizard's Club Dread were released posthumously on the album Take Another Hit: The Best of Coconut Pete.

== Personal life ==
Paxton married Kelly Rowan in 1979 and they divorced a year later. He met Louise Newbury on a bus in Twickenham, London, where she was a student. They were married in 1987. They lived in Ojai, California, and had two children, including James, who also became an actor.

== Death and lawsuit ==
In early February 2017, Paxton stated in an interview on WTF with Marc Maron that he had a damaged aortic heart valve, resulting from rheumatic fever that he contracted as a child. On February 14, 2017, he underwent open-heart surgery at Cedars-Sinai Medical Center in Los Angeles to repair the damaged valve and correct an aortic aneurysm. He died of a stroke eleven days later on February 25 at the age of 61. He was cremated and his ashes were buried at the Forest Lawn Memorial Park of Hollywood Hills.

In 2018, Paxton's estate filed a wrongful death lawsuit against Cedars-Sinai Medical Center and surgeon Ali Khoynezhad. The hospital settled the lawsuit.

== Tributes ==
=== Public figures ===
Filmmakers and actors paid tribute to Paxton after his death. On February 26, 2017, while introducing the annual In Memoriam segment at the 89th Academy Awards the day after Paxton's death, a visibly emotional Jennifer Aniston paid tribute to him. His Big Love co-star Chloë Sevigny remembered him as "one of the less cynical, jaded people [she'd] ever met in the business" and said, "He believed in entertainment being transportive and transformative. He believed in the magic of what we can bring to people. That was really a gift that he gave to me." The television show Agents of S.H.I.E.L.D. paid tribute at the end of its season-four episode "What If...", and a number of storm chasers paid tribute to his role in Twister by spelling out his initials "BP" via the Spotter Network.

=== Films ===
The 2017 film Call Me by Your Name was dedicated to Paxton's memory. The film's producer, Peter Spears, explained that his husband Brian Swardstrom, who was also Paxton's best friend and agent, once visited the set with Paxton during filming and befriended the film's director Luca Guadagnino, who ultimately decided to dedicate the film "in loving memory of Bill Paxton". Close friend and frequent collaborator James Cameron wrote a tribute in an article for Vanity Fair, detailing their 36-year friendship and expressing regret over the projects they would not be able to make together. The 2019 John Travolta film The Fanatic, which co-starred Paxton's son James, was dedicated to Paxton. James would later play a younger version of Paxton's S.H.I.E.L.D. character in the final season of Agents of S.H.I.E.L.D., which served as a tribute to his role in the show. Cameron's 2022 film, Avatar: The Way of Water was dedicated to the memory of Paxton as well as to James Horner, who previously worked with Cameron on Aliens, Titanic and the first Avatar. Paxton worked with both Cameron and Horner on the former two films. Cameron had hoped to cast Paxton in the Avatar sequels before his death.

== Filmography ==
=== Film ===
Year	Title	Role	Notes	Ref.
1975	Crazy Mama	John	Uncredited	
1981	Butcher, Baker, Nightmare Maker/Night Warning	Eddie	as William Paxton	
1981	Stripes	Soldier #8		
1983	Reckless	"Bobo"		
1983	The Lords of Discipline	Gilbreath		
1983	Mortuary	Paul Andrews		
1983	Taking Tiger Mountain	Billy Hampton		
1984	Streets of Fire	Clyde, The Bartender		
1984	Impulse	Eddie		
1984	The Terminator	Johnny		
1985	Weird Science	Chet Donnelly		
1985	Commando	Intercept Officer #1		
1986	Aliens	Private William Hudson		
1987	Near Dark	Severen		
1988	Pass the Ammo	Jesse Wilkes		
1989	Slipstream	Matt Owens		
1989	Next of Kin	Gerald Gates		
1989	Back to Back	Bo Brand		
1990	Brain Dead	Jim Reston		
1990	The Last of the Finest	Howard "Hojo" Jones		
1990	Navy SEALs	Floyd "God" Dane		
1990	Predator 2	Detective Jerry Lambert		
1991	The Dark Backward	Gus		
1992	One False Move	Sheriff Dale "Hurricane" Dixon		
1992	The Vagrant	Graham Krakowski		
1992	Trespass	Vince Gillian		
1993	Boxing Helena	Ray O'Malley		
1993	Indian Summer	Jack Belston		
1993	Monolith	Tucker		
1993	Tombstone	Morgan Earp		
1994	Future Shock	Vince		
1994	True Lies	Simon		
1995	Apollo 13	Fred Haise		
1995	The Last Supper	Zachary Cody		
1995	Frank and Jesse	Frank James		
1996	Twister	Dr. Bill Harding		
1996	The Evening Star	Jerry Bruckner		
1997	Traveller	Bokky		
1997	Titanic	Brock Lovett		
1998	A Simple Plan	Hank Mitchell		
1998	Mighty Joe Young	Professor Gregory O'Hara		
2000	U-571	Lieutenant Commander Mike Dahlgren		
2000	Vertical Limit	Elliot Vaughn		
2001	Frailty	Dad Meiks	Also director	
2002	Spy Kids 2: The Island of Lost Dreams	"Dinky" Winks	Cameo	
2003	Ghosts of the Abyss	Himself / The Narrator		
2003	Resistance	Major Ted Brice		
2003	Spy Kids 3-D: Game Over	"Dinky" Winks	Cameo	
2004	Broken Lizard's Club Dread	Pete "Coconut Pete" Wabash		
2004	Thunderbirds	Jeff Tracy		
2004	Haven	Carl Ridley		
2005	Magnificent Desolation: Walking on the Moon 3D	Edgar Mitchell	Short film	
2007	The Good Life	Robbie		
2011	Haywire	John Kane		
2011	Tornado Alley	The Narrator		
2012	Shanghai Calling	Donald		
2013	The Colony	Mason		
2013	2 Guns	CIA Agent Earl		
2013	Red Wing	Jim Verret		
2014	Million Dollar Arm	Tom House		
2014	Edge of Tomorrow	Master Sergeant Farell		
2014	Nightcrawler	Joe Loder		
2015	Pixies	Eddie Beck	Voice	
2016	Term Life	Detective Joe Keenan		
2016	Mean Dreams	Wayne Caraway		
2017	The Circle	Vinnie Holland	Posthumous release	

=== Television ===
Year	Title	Role	Notes	Ref.
1983	Deadly Lessons	Eddie Fox	Movie	
1985	An Early Frost	Bob Maracek	Movie	
1985	The Atlanta Child Murders	Campbell	Miniseries	
1986	Fresno	Billy Joe Bobb	Miniseries (4 episodes)	
1986	Miami Vice	Detective Victor "Vic" Romano	Episode: "Streetwise"	
1987	The Hitchhiker	Trout	Episode: "Made for Each Other"	
1993	Tales from the Crypt	Billy DeLuca	Episode: "People Who Live in Brass Hearses"	
1998	A Bright Shining Lie	John Paul Vann	Movie	
2003	Frasier	Ernie	Episode: "Analyzed Kiss"	
2006–2011	Big Love	Bill Henrickson	Lead role (53 episodes)	
2012	Hatfields & McCoys	Randolph McCoy	Miniseries (3 episodes)	
2013	JFK: The Day That Changed Everything	The Narrator	Documentary	
2014	Agents of S.H.I.E.L.D.	John Garrett	6 episodes	
2015	Texas Rising	Sam Houston	Miniseries	
2015	The Gamechangers	Jack Thompson	Movie	
2017	Training Day	Detective Frank Roarke	Lead role (13 episodes)	

=== Music videos ===
Year	Title	Artist	Role	Notes	Ref.
1980	"Fish Heads"	Barnes & Barnes	Main character	Also director	
1982	"Love Tap"	Barnes & Barnes	Main character		
1982	"Shadows of the Night"	Pat Benatar	Wehrmacht-Unteroffizier		
1983	"Soak It Up"	Barnes & Barnes	Main character		
1984	"Ah Ā"	Barnes & Barnes			
1986	"How Can the Labouring Man Find Time for Self-Culture?"	Martini Ranch			
1987	"Touched by the Hand of God"	New Order			
1988	"Reach"	Martini Ranch	Main character		
2003	"Eat You Alive"	Limp Bizkit	Sheriff		

=== Video games ===
Year	Title	Role	Notes	Ref.
2015	Call of Duty: Advanced Warfare	Kahn	Exo Zombies	
2026	Dead by Daylight	Private William Hudson	Playable character; likeness (posthumous release)	

=== Theme park attractions ===
Year	Title	Role	Notes
1998	Twister...Ride it Out	Himself	Pre-show co-host with Helen Hunt

== Production work ==
Year	Title	Director	Producer	Writer	Notes
1977	The Egyptian Princess, an Unfolding Fantasy	No	Yes	No	Short
1980	Saturday Night Live	Yes	No	No	1 episode
1980	Barnes & Barnes: Fish Heads	Yes	Yes	Yes	Video short; Executive producer
1981	Barnes & Barnes: Love Tap	No	No	Yes	Video short; Head writer
1982	Scoop	No	Yes	Yes	Short; Co-writer
1988	Martini Ranch: Reach	No	Yes	No	Video short
1988	Martini Ranch: How Can the Laboring Man Find Time for Self-Culture	No	Yes	No	Video Short
1997	Traveller	No	Yes	No	
2001	Frailty	Yes	No	No	
2005	The Greatest Game Ever Played	Yes	No	No	
2007	The Good Life	No	Yes	No	Executive producer
2011	Tattoo	Yes	No	Yes	Short
2013	Parkland	No	Yes	No	

== Awards and nominations ==
Year	Association	Category	Title	Result	Ref.
1983	USA Film Festival	Honorable Mention	Scoop	Won	
1987	Saturn Awards	Best Supporting Actor	Aliens	Won	
1995	CableACE Awards	Best Actor in a Dramatic Series	Tales from the Crypt	Nominated	
1996	Screen Actors Guild	Outstanding Performance by a Cast in a Motion Picture	Apollo 13	Won	
1997	Saturn Awards	Best Actor	Twister	Nominated	
1998	Screen Actors Guild	Outstanding Performance by a Cast in a Motion Picture	Titanic	Nominated	
1999	Golden Globe Awards	Best Actor – Miniseries or Television Film	A Bright Shining Lie	Nominated	
2003	Saturn Awards	Best Director	Frailty	Nominated	
2006	Satellite Awards	Best Actor – Television Series Drama	Big Love	Nominated	
2007	Satellite Awards	Best Actor – Television Series Drama	Big Love	Nominated	
2007	Golden Globe Awards	Best Actor – Television Series Drama	Big Love	Nominated	
2008	Golden Globe Awards	Best Actor – Television Series Drama	Big Love	Nominated	
2009	Satellite Awards	Best Actor – Television Series Drama	Big Love	Nominated	
2010	Golden Globe Awards	Best Actor – Television Series Drama	Big Love	Nominated	
2012	Primetime Emmy Awards	Outstanding Lead Actor in a Limited Series or a Movie	Hatfields & McCoys	Nominated	
2013	Screen Actors Guild	Outstanding Performance by a Male Actor in a Miniseries or Television Movie	Hatfields & McCoys	Nominated	
