= American Board of Thoracic Surgery =

American surgical organization devoted to thoracic surgery

The American Board of Thoracic Surgery is an American surgical organization devoted to thoracic surgery. The ABTS will soon shut down their access to the Self-Education Self Assessment in Thoracic Surgery.
