= History of African Americans in San Antonio =

The African American population in San Antonio, Texas has been a significant part of the city's community since its founding. African Americans have been a part of the Greater San Antonio's history since the late 1800s. San Antonio ranks as the top Texas destination city for Black professionals.

== History ==
Many of the first Spanish settlers in San Antonio came from the Canary Islands, and a significant portion were of African descent. In 1792, there were 34 blacks and 414 mulattos in Spanish Texas. Anglo white immigration into Mexican Texas in the 1820s brought an increased numbers of slaves. Many African Americans in Texas remained in slavery until after the U.S. Civil War ended. There was scarce Union Army activity in Texas, preventing them from joining the Northern lines. During the Reconstruction era, newly emancipated African American slaves began moving from rural areas in Texas to San Antonio, establishing Freedmen's Towns on the city's East Side. Ellis Alley was one of the first African-American settlements in San Antonio. The census recorded 592 African-American slaves of 3,488 total residents living in San Antonio in 1850, five years after Texas joined the United States. Although slavery ended after the U.S. Civil War, by the mid-1870s racial segregation became codified throughout the South, including Texas. African Americans left Texas by the tens of thousands during the Great Migration in the first half of the 20th century, seeking work and political opportunities elsewhere. African Americans have owned land in San Antonio since Texas’ early colonial period and there are still are black landowners to the present day. San Antonio's military presence, particularly at Lackland and Kelly Air Force Bases, has historically drawn African American families seeking civil service jobs. African Americans in San Antonio were poorly represented by the predominantly white state legislature and city council, and were politically disenfranchised during the Jim Crow era; whites had used a variety of tactics, including militias and legislation, to re-establish political and social supremacy throughout the South. Racial segregation ended in the mid-1960s. On March 16, 1960, San Antonio became the first southern city to begin integration of its small restaurants when Richard Hunt sat at the lunch counter of the Woolworth's lunch counter in Alamo Plaza. In the 1970s, the African American population in San Antonio was 7.6 percent.

Forbes ranked San Antonio in one of The Top 10 Cities Where African-Americans Are Doing The Best Economically. San Antonio ranks as the top Texas destination city for Black professionals and entrepreneurs. San Antonio is one of the fastest-growing large cities in the United States, and a large portion of that growth is due to an influx of Black residents. In addition to the New Great Migration, many African Americans in the US are now recently moving to San Antonio for lower cost of living and more job opportunities with harmonious Black and Hispanic relations. San Antonio is considered more affordable in lower cost of living than Austin, Dallas, and Houston, which is an additional draw for many African American families. San Antonio's grocery prices are lower than the national average which also attracts many African Americans. San Antonio's Black population has increased by more than 10,000 throughout the decade. When the census numbers were collected last year, there were nearly 94,000 non-Hispanic Black residents were living in the city, amounting to 6.5 percent of the total population. 13 percent increase from the number of residents recorded in 2010. An additional 25,000 to 35,000 mostly black evacuees arrived in 2005 from the New Orleans metro after Hurricane Katrina with many of them deciding to stay in San Antonio. Ivy Taylor was also the first African American to be elected mayor of San Antonio and only the second woman in the position. San Antonio offers a thriving job market in military, tourism, energy, tech, and healthcare, also a sizeable percentage of Black-owned businesses, and diverse suburban communities. San Antonio's Black homeownership has increased during the pandemic.

== Demographics ==
In the 1970s, The African American population in San Antonio was 7.6 percent. The number of blacks increased in San Antonio, growing by 25 percent throughout the last decade, which was a surge of more than 29,000 people. Nearly 148,000 blacks were living in Bexar County by 2020. The broader San Antonio metropolitan area features over 214,000 Black residents, having grown by nearly 92% since 2000. They accounted for 7.4 percent of Bexar County's population up from 6.9 percent in 2010 and still increasing.

The East Side of San Antonio has a large concentration of predominantly African American residents. Denver Heights is historically one of the oldest black neighborhoods in San Antonio. Outside of the East Side, the San Antonio black population of both working and middle-class black families is located on the diverse Northeast Side. Many middle- and upper-middle-class Black families have moved to suburbs east and northeast of San Antonio including Cibolo, Converse, Dignowity Hill, Kirby and Windcrest as their presence has been around since the 1980s and 90s. African Americans are also located in parts of San Antonio's West Side.

== Cuisine ==
There are several Black-owned restaurants around San Antonio offering Soul food, Creole, barbecue, wings, and vegan, and Ethiopian. Restaurants include Tony G's Soul Food, Ma Harper's Creole Kitchen, and Big Mama's Taste of Soul.

== Politics ==
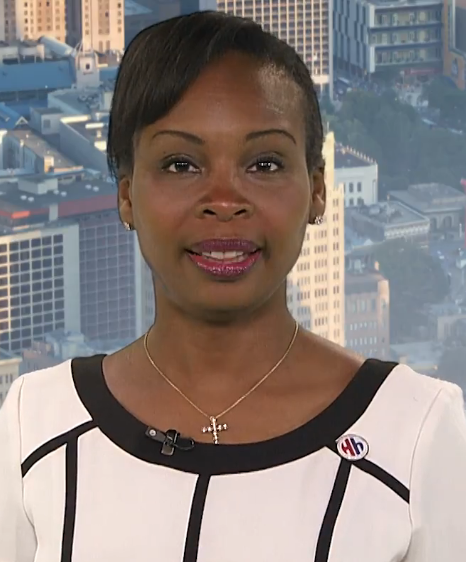
Ivy Taylor

Ivy Taylor was the first African American to be elected mayor of San Antonio and only the second woman in the position. In addition, Taylor was the first female African-American mayor of a city with a population of more than one million. Taylor was elected to San Antonio City Council in 2009 to represent District 2 on the east side of the city, and was re-elected to the body in 2011 and 2013. In 2021, Councilmember Jalen McKee-Rodriguez was elected to serve City Council District 2. The Alamo City Black Chamber of Commerce in San Antonio was established in April, 1938.

== Media ==
The San Antonio Observer is a weekly tabloid established in 1995, and bills itself as the only African American newspaper in San Antonio. The newspaper attracted national attention in 2016 when it held a news conference for a police shooting of an unarmed Black man, and announced, then later retracted, a threat to reveal the addresses of all police officers in San Antonio.

== Cultural institutions ==
The San Antonio African American Community Archive and Museum (SAAACAM) is a digital archive and museum located in the La Villita Historic Arts Village District near the San Antonio River Walk.

100 Black Men of San Antonio, Inc. is a community organization that aims to improve the quality of life within the communities and enhance educational and economic opportunities for youth in the community.

The Alamo City Black Chamber of Commerce serves and supports black businesses and professionals.

== Education ==
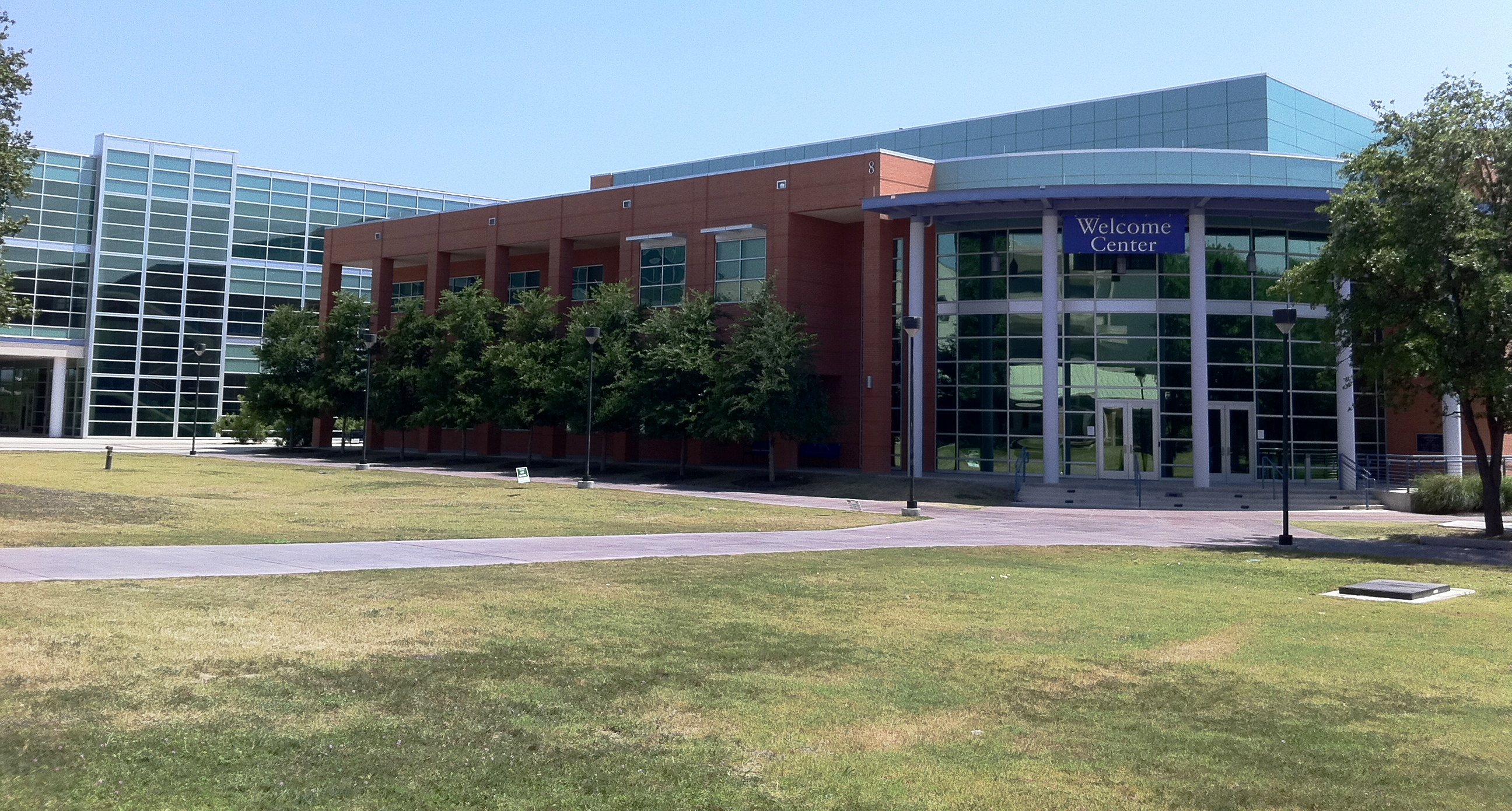
St. Philip's College in San Antonio

=== Colleges and universities ===
St. Philip's College is a public community college located in San Antonio, accredited by the Southern Association of Colleges and Schools. It is the westernmost HBCU in the United States. St. Philip's College, a part of the Alamo Colleges District, currently serves more than 11,000 students in over 70 different academic and technical disciplines. It is the only college to be federally designated as both a historically black college and a Hispanic-serving institution. The University of Texas at San Antonio is also attracting a rising number of Black students. San Antonio has the highest rate of Black graduates in Texas.

=== Primary and secondary schools ===
Sam Houston High School, is a historically African American public high school with a Hispanic student body. It is one of the first African American high Schools in San Antonio; it is located in eastern San Antonio and classified as a 4A school by the UIL. This school is one of twelve schools in the San Antonio Independent School District. In 2015, the school was rated "Met Standard" by the Texas Education Agency.

=== Other historically black schools ===
Other historically black high schools (schools reserved for black students prior to desegregation in the 1960s) in San Antonio include:

- East Central High School
- Judson High School
- Karen Wagner High School
- Robert G. Cole Junior-Senior High School

== Notable Locations ==
=== Mount Zion First Baptist Church ===
Mount Zion First Baptist Church is a historic African American church located at 333 Martin Luther King Drive in San Antonio, Texas. Founded in 1871 by former slaves, the church has since provided ministerial services to thousands and played a major role in the Civil Rights Movement of the city. In 1949 the Reverend Claude Black Jr. became pastor and lead the church to national prominence in the National Baptist Convention. Pastor Black who would become a Civil Rights icon and city councilman would invite figures controversial at the time to speak from his pulpit. Some of those would include Thurgood Marshall, Adam Clayton Powell Jr., Azie Taylor Morton, Percy Sutton, Barbara Jordan and others. The church created the city's first black owned credit union as well as Project Free, a program dedicated to assisting the poor and the elderly. The church was burned down by arson in 1974, but rebuilt the following year.

== Tourism ==
Over twenty million tourists visit San Antonio and its attractions every year, contributing substantially to its economy, primarily due to The Alamo and the River Walk. Additional attractions that draw tourism include Six Flags Fiesta Texas and Sea World San Antonio.

== Events, culture, and recreation ==
Notable African-American cultural point of interest includes the San Antonio African American Community Archive & Museum.

=== MLK March ===
In 1987, the City of San Antonio's Martin Luther King, Jr. Commission held its first official march, building on marches that have occurred since 1968. The event typically draws more than 300,000 participants and is one of the largest in the United States.

=== Black Restaurant Week San Antonio ===
Black Restaurant Week San Antonio (BRWSA) is an annual, week-long event that first occurred in 2019. During BRWSA, local restaurants offer specials and curated dining experiences, and attendees can watch live cooking competitions. The celebration recognizes the contributions made to San Antonio culinary culture by Black restaurants and business owners. BRWSA donates a portion of proceeds annually to local charities such as the San Antonio Food Bank.

=== San Antonio Hip Hop ===
San Antonio Rap is a subgenre of music considered to be a regional variant of U.S. Southern hip hop that often samples from classic soul records, funk records, and traditional Mexican music. The subgenre utilizes both Spanish and Spanglish in addition to English lyrics. Notable artists in San Antonio include Lil Sin, P.K.O., Worldwide, Richie Branson, Cadillac Muzik, King Kyle Lee, and Mike Dimes.

=== San Antonio Nightlife Culture ===
San Antonio has an active black nightlife culture including bars, nightclubs, and comedy clubs.

=== San Antonio Royal Steppaz ===
San Antonio Royal Steppaz is an African American trail riding group in San Antonio founded during the pandemic by Ronnie Jones (President) and LaShondella Ford, the group has grown significantly to preserve and celebrate Black cowboy culture, country living, horsemanship and connect members to nature and history. San Antonio Royal Steppaz preserves the legacy of the original cowboy by reintroducing true horsemanship & promoting the country lifestyle.

== Notable residents ==
- Al Freeman Jr., American actor
- NaLyssa Smith, basketball player
- Sterling Houston, experimental playwright
- Terence Steele is an American NFL football offensive tackle for the Dallas Cowboys.
- Sam Hurd, former American NFL football wide receiver
- G. J. Sutton (June 22, 1909 – June 22, 1976) was the first black official elected from San Antonio, Texas
- Artemisia Bowden (January 1, 1879 – August 18, 1969) was an African American school administrator and civil rights activist.
- Cadillac Muzik, Hip Hop group
- Shaquille O'Neal, American professional retired basketball player, graduated from Robert G. Cole High School
- Bo Outlaw, American professional retired basketball player
- Phillip Martin III, rapper
- David Robinson, former San Antonio Spur
- Clifford Scott, American saxophonist and flautist
- King Kyle Lee, rapper
- Mike Dimes, rapper
- BillyRay Sheppard, saxophonist and recording artist
- Ivy Taylor, former mayor of San Antonio
- Mel Waiters, American R&B singer

== See also ==
- History of African Americans in Texas
  - History of African Americans in Dallas–Fort Worth
  - History of African Americans in Houston
  - History of African Americans in Austin
- History of Nigerian Americans in San Antonio
