= D45 =

D45 may refer to:

- D45 road (Croatia)
- Dresden 45, an American band
- HMS Dauntless (D45), a Danae-class light cruiser of the Royal Navy
- Martin D-45, an acoustic guitar
- Polycythemia vera
- Semi-Slav Defense, a chess opening
