= Black Math =

Black Math may refer to:

- "Black Math", a season 4 episode of the television show Black-ish
- "Black Math", a track on the 2003 White Stripes album Elephant

== See also ==
- Black Math Experiment
