= Weltklang =

Weltklang (German for "world sound") may refer to:

- Weltklang, a radio model manufactured by Grundig
- Weltklang (musical instrument brand), an East German brand of musical instruments
- Weltklang (musical duo), an electronic music project from West Berlin founded in 1980
