= League of Extraordinary Gz =

American hip hop group

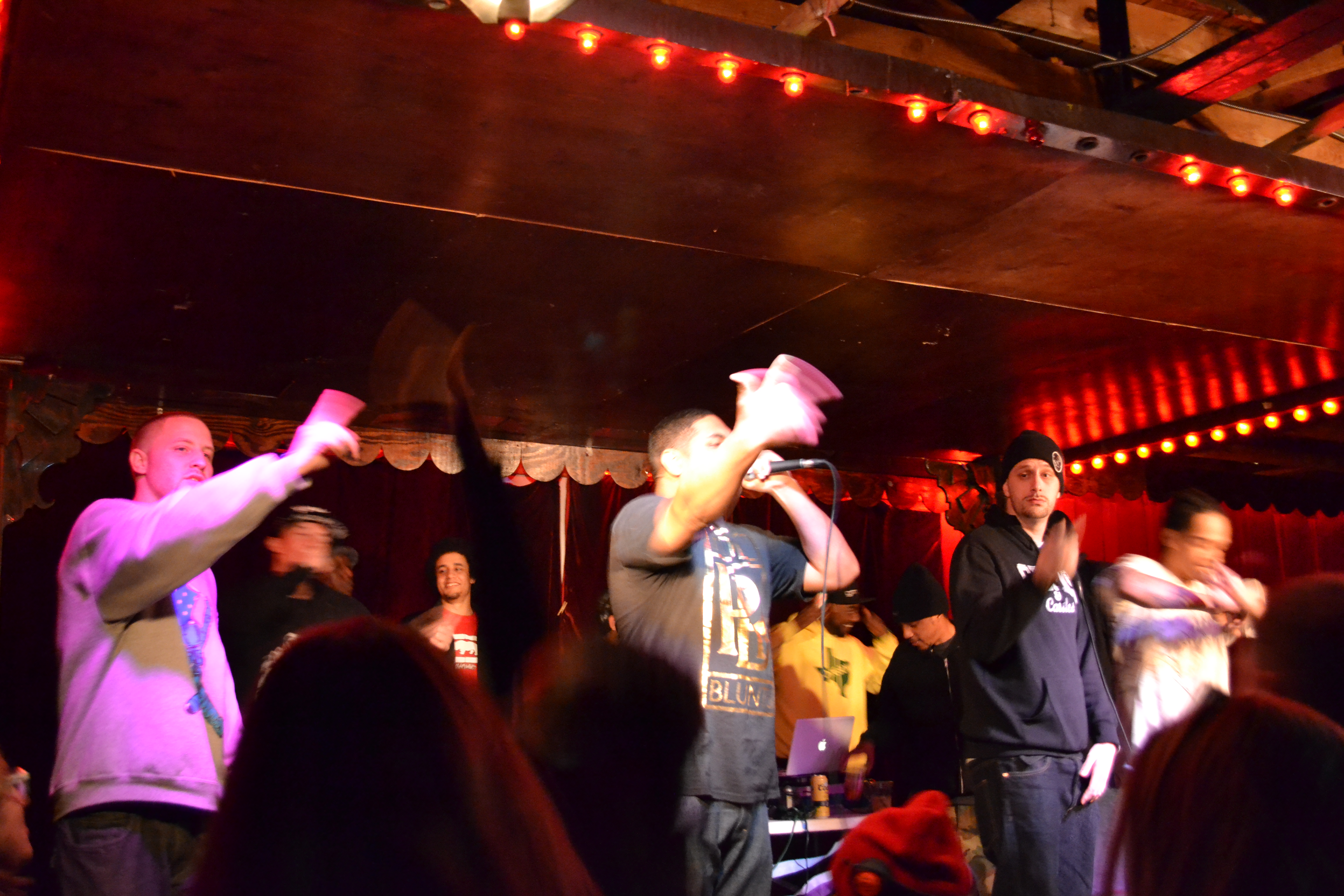

Background information
- Also known as: LOEGz
- Origin: Austin Texas, United States
- Genres: Hip hop
- Occupations: Rappers, producers
- Years active: 2009–2014
- Members: Reggie Coby; Mr. Greezo; S.Dot; Dominican Jay aka Lil J Tuk Da Gat; Dowrong; Sandman; Lowkey
- Past members: Esbe Da 6th Street Bully (deceased)
- Website: Official website

League of Extraordinary G'z (sometimes stylized as LOEGz) was an American hip hop group from Austin, Texas. They released their debut album #LeagueShit in 2013.

== Career ==
LOEGz have worked with well-known artists including Rittz and Devin the Dude. In 2010, LOEGz performed at South by Southwest and Fun Fun Fun Fest. On October 15, 2013, the group released #Leagueshit, their self-released debut studio album with features from Dead Prez, Grupo Fantasma and Slim Gravy of A.Dd+. The League of Extraordinary Gz have toured the country countless times with the likes of Dead Prez, Strange Music artist Rittz, Killer Mike, Scotty ATL, Starlito & more

== Discography ==
=== Albums ===
The Plug (2012)

- #LeagueShit (2013)
