= Asmodeus X =

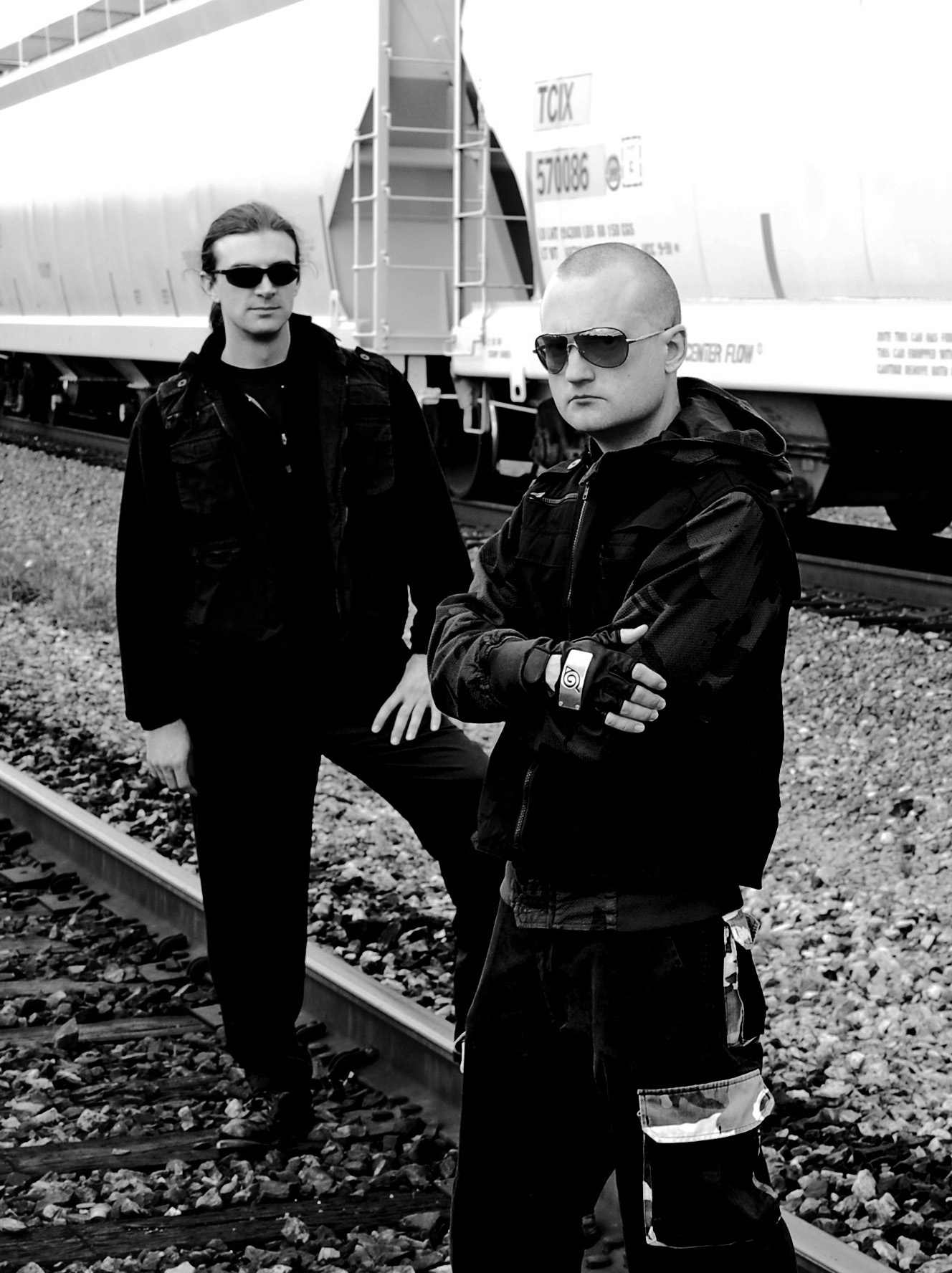
- Asmodeus X: left to right, Brad Marshall, Paul Fredric. Photo courtesy Komodokat, 2008

Background information
- Origin: Houston, Texas U.S.
- Genre: Electro-industrial
- Years active: 1999 – present
- Labels: Next-Gen Records, Underground, Inc., Latex Records
- Members: Paul Fredric; Joel 313; Chris Vasquez
- Past members: Brad Marshal; Frank G. Lesikar
- Website: Official Asmodeus X website

Asmodeus X is an American electro-industrial band whose music is frequently characterized as a mixture of EBM and darkwave and typically includes the use of environmental sampling. Their style is said to be influenced by the music of Laibach, Kraftwerk, Death in June, and Front 242, among others. The vocals have been described as following in the EBM/synthpop tradition of being “somewhat flat”, lending a “darker edge” to the music. The band is promoted as “the original and ex officio 'Black Corps' of the industrial underground”.

== History ==
=== Morphine Angel ===
Asmodeus X was founded by Paul Fredric and Brad Marshal in Houston, Texas in 1999. Fredric (Paul McAtee) and Marshal were originally members of a Goth band called, “Morphine Angel”, formed in Lincoln, Nebraska in 1993, and later based in Chicago, Illinois. During this time, part of Fredric's musical training came from work with Thomas Thorn, lead vocalist for the industrial metal band Electric Hellfire Club, contributing vocals for EHC's song "Pack 44".

Recording on the St. Thomas, Black Pepper and Delinquent Records labels, Morphine Angel developed a significant following. Their song "Age of Man" was included in the soundtrack to the independent film, Shut Eye, alongside other popular goth-oriented electro bands such as In Strict Confidence. However, the band fell apart as members relocated to different cities; Fredric and Marshal leaving in March 1999. Later that year, the two formed Asmodeus X.

=== Asmodeus X ===
Asmodeus X’s first release, The Cult of the Nassarene, was released the year prior to their live debut at the Houston club Instant Karma on February 26, 2000. The band grew with the addition of guitarist Frank G. Lesikar and their performances earned the 2000 Critic's choice for Best Industrial/Noise Band from the Houston Press. This was followed by the release of two singles with St. Thomas Records, one being a cover of the Fever Tree hit, "San Francisco Girls".

Their first studio album, Nova Futura, was produced in 2001 by Victor Peraino, former keyboardist of Kingdom Come, and included the song, "The Tiger", featuring guest drummer Dennis “Machine Gun” Thompson, formerly of MC5 as guest drummer. The album also contained re-recorded tracks of their singles. However, differences between the studio and St. Thomas prevented the album’s release.

The first studio album that was released was 2002's Wolf Age, put out under the Black Pepper Records label. The album showed off a key element that defines the band's sound—rich programming with extensive use of environmental sound samples and “darkened neo-classical noise-scapes”. The lyrics of the band's music are generally described as thoughtful or intellectual; meditations on “the darkest realms of the animal mind and the human condition” with "Goetic, Objectivist and left-hand path elements". A further example of this is seen in their choice to remix a sound recording, Underground Tunnels by a proponent of the left-hand path, Tapio Kotkavuori. Later, Fredric provided philosophical contexts for their two subsequent albums in a self-published 2009 book, The Erbeth Transmissions.

Soon after Wolf Age, Lesikar died. His guitar wasn't replaced. Instead, Asmodeus X brought in Joel Schafer (Joel 313) to fill in on electronic percussion in 2003. They had previously worked together at a concert at the Satellite Lounge in Houston prior to the production of Nova Futura, then playing on acoustic drums.

The band signed with Latex Records for their third album, Morningstar in 2004. It was picked for album of the month for January 2005 by Electrogeneration. This album also yielded their most popular downloaded song to date, a cover of the Psychic TV hit, "Roman P".

This was followed two years later by Sanctuary, which in addition to new tracks, also revisited past songs. It featured guest stints by the Los Angeles band Typhon Vortex on "Microcosm" and former Morphine Angel guitarist Deros Mezmeronicus (Carl Gibson) on "On a Spaceship with Beelzebub", as well as posthumously reworking guitarwork of Lesikar.

With Next-Gen Records in 2008, they released the two-disc style collection The Greater Key – primarily a compilation of remixes of music from the band’s prior two albums by prominent genre DJs and groups, such as Australian band Masquerade, Weltklang, The Evolutionaries (who contributed to the Xbox 360 Dead Rising soundtrack) and members of Written in Ashes, Provision and Bozo Porno Circus. The following year, the band produced two new singles and won Best Album for Sanctuary, Best E.P. for the untitled promotional version of The Greater Key, and Live Performance at the Revolutions Music Awards. This year also marked Joel 313 leaving the band to re-form Provision. Currently, Kirk Graham of the California-based synthpop band Phase Theory fills in on live performances of Asmodeus X.

The band experimented with adding other members to the band, like journeyman Chris Vasquez (Skeleton Dick) on keyboards. Vasquez appears on the band's music videos for On a Spaceship with Beelzebub and Theos and remixed two songs for The Greater Key. With Marshall leaving the band in 2014, Joel 313 and Vasquez returned, respectively splitting time with other projects, Post Faction and Skeleton Dick. The band later released the albums The Bright Ones and Dark Ides of Summer. The title track for the former album was previously well-received in its inclusion in the compilation Negative Impact V0.3 from PfF Productions. 2020 saw the release of the EP Black Fire, a mostly acoustic offering reflecting their neo-folk roots.

=== Asmodeus X side projects ===
In 2004, Asmodeus X played the role of the Tommy Gnosis band in a Houston stage production of Hedwig and the Angry Inch, performing "Wicked Little Town (Reprise)" with a lead vocalist from The Black Math Experiment, Jef With One F. Later in 2006, they went on to remix a Black Math song, "Ruler of the Rock Robots (A Love Story)", which was retitled, "Ruler of the Trance Robots".

Fredric has stepped away from the band occasionally to fill in on electronic percussion for the synthpop band Red Flag and splits his time as a founding member (Mixmaster Fritzi) of Phase Theory, working in production and playing synthesizer and electronic percussion. In 2006, he teamed with author and singer Alice Karlsdóttir and guest artists like Ian Read of the dark folk band Fire + Ice on a neo-folk project called Verdandi. He also founded Sakaki 4, which released an album in 2009. Fredric further recorded with TG Mondalf a Subgenius “rant” aired on Hour of Slack #993 by Rev. Ivan Stang, founder of the Church of the Subgenius. Fredric also worked with Craig Ellenwood of Psychic TV on a 2011 music video, Fire Idol vs Asmodeus X -Coconut Disco (Asmodeian mix).

== Other band members ==
Other musicians who played with the band onstage include Reverend TiG (keyboards) from Bozo Porno Circus and Bamboo Crisis and Allison Scott (acoustic drums and keyboards) (Opulent).

== Members ==
=== Current ===
- Paul Fredric – vocals, programming, theremin (1999–present)
- Joel 313 (Joel Schafer) – electronic percussion (2003–2009; 2014–present)
- Chris Vasquez – keyboards (2014–present)

=== Former ===
- Brad Marshal – keyboards, synthesizers (1999-2014)
- Frank G. Lesikar (Frank Faust / Gary Lesikar) – guitars (1999–2002)

== In popular culture ==
Darker Shores from the Sanctuary album and Morphine Angel’s Breakfast with Cthulhu were reviewed in their relationship to the writings of H.P. Lovecraft in The Strange Sound of Cthulhu: Music Inspired by the Writings of H.P. Lovecraft, a 2006 book by Gary Hill of Music Street Journal.

== Discography ==
=== Full-length albums ===
- Nova Futura, 2001 – St. Thomas Records
- Wolf Age, 2002 - Black Pepper Records (Houston)
- Morningstar, 2004 – Latex Records; CD includes music video for Voices Of The Fallen
- Sanctuary, 2006 – Kreislauf Records
- The Greater Key (Compilation), 2008 – Next-Gen Records
- The Bright Ones, 2011 – Kreislauf Records
- Dark Ides of Summer, 2018 – Latex Records

=== EPs ===
- The Cult of the Nassarene, 1999, limited release
- (untitled), 2003, promotional release for Wolf Age
- (untitled), 2008, promotional release for The Greater Key – Next-Gen Records
- Black Fire, 2020

=== Singles ===
- "San Francisco Girls"/"Holy Fire", 2000 – St. Thomas Records
- "The Cow"/"Beyond the Water", 2000 – St. Thomas Records
- "God's Creation (Asmodeus X Remix)" (Remix of In[Perfektion] song), 2006
- "Own Little World (Asmodeus X Mix)" (Remix of Celldweller song), 2007
- "Underground Tunnels (Asmodeus X remix)", 2008 (as music video)
- "Theos", 2009 (as music video)
- "Watch Out (Asmodeus X Remix)" (Remix of Ex-VoTo song), 2009 – Poor Alice Music
- "Power Factory", 2009
- "Catatonic Refugee", 2009

=== Compilation appearances ===
- "Krishna (Weird Blue Light Mix)", Track #2, Primal River Valley – The Past By Way Of The Future, (various artists), 2005 – Latex Records
- "Ideal – Asmodeus X Remix", Track #10, Ideal Warfare, Provision, 2006 – Section 44 Records
- "Ruler of the Trance Robots (A Remix)", Track #14, Last Transmission From The Blue Room, The Black Math Experiment, 2007
- "Resurrection (Remixed by Asmodeus X)", Track #2, Resurrection EP, Warforge, 2007 – Xenobiotic Records
- "The Bright Ones", Track #11, Negative Impact Vol. 3, (various artists), 2008 – PfF Productions
- "Always the Same featuring Asmodeus X", Track #1-6, The Grey Years, 2008 – Bleiburg
- "Find Another Way", Track #1-3, (various artists), Free Tibet Free, 2008 – Dark Transmission (Germany)
- "Power Factory (Alle Lassen Mix)", Track #8, Negative Impact Vol. 4, 2011 – PfF Productions
- "Something I Missed (feat. SPIKE the Percussionist)", Track #10, (various artists), New Mind Emergence (Artificial Intelligence), 2016 – Latex Records

== Remixes and covers of Asmodeus X ==
- "Crucified Serpent (Valhalla Mix)", Endymion, Track #2-4, Hunter's Moon, (various artists), 2006 Stark (Damon Law), Written in Ashes – Dark Horizons
- "Wolf In The Sky", Fremdheit (Germany), Track #5, North Country, Verdandi, 2006
- "Typhoon", Led Manville (Spain), Track #2-11, God Plays Dice, DJ Led Manville, 2007
- "Morningstar (Flaschback Mix)", Track #2-9, hEADaCHE re:mixes V2: Highly Dangerous Defects, hEADaCHE, 2006 – Underground Inc.

== Music videos ==
- Wolf in the Sky, 2003 – director David J
- Voices of the Fallen, 2004 – director Amy Coster
- MuZ, 2006 – director Xeghys
- Glass Towers, 2006 – director Paul Fredric
- Wewelsburg 2 (Driving to Wewelsburg), 2007 – director Paul Fredric
- Astaroth, 2008 – director Paul Fredric
- Theos, 2009 – director Paul Fredric
- On a Spaceship with Beelzebub, 2009 – director Paul Fredric
- Fifth Planet, 2011 – director Chris Camacho
- The Bright Ones, 2012 – director Paul Fredric
