= The Hunger (band) =

American industrial rock band

- Origin: Houston, Texas
- Genres: Industrial rock EBM Synthpop
- Years active: 1989-present
- Labels: Universal Records, GUT Records, Alpha International
- Members: Jeff Wilson; Thomas Wilson; Richie Hey; Jeff Smith; Alex Slay
- Past members: Matt"SOLO"Fogarty; Brian Albritton; Max Schuldberg; Stephen Bogle; Angel Perez; Giovanni Capelo; Tim Huston; Darren Nelson; Raf Rivera

The Hunger is an American industrial rock band from Houston, Texas formed by brothers Jeff and Thomas Wilson along with Brian Albritton.

During the initial year of putting the band together and working on new material the band wrote and independently released the single, "Shock" in 1991 which rose to the top of the dance charts. Industrial dance music ruled the charts in Europe along with strong ties to Chicago, Wax Trax Records, and Houston. Subsequent releases of "Cut the Skin" and "Shoot to Kill" gained national exposure on the dance charts and club scene. "Never Again" was self-released as a radio single and quickly rose to the top of Houston Radio Station's 93Q and 96.5 attracting the attention of independent record label Alpha International. Stephen Bogle produced the single of "Never Again".

The band wrote and produced the album "Leave Me Alone" but due to the bankruptcy of Alpha International the record sat idle. It was released but there were no marketing efforts behind it. After the release of the album, the band sought out drummer Max Schuldberg and they played their first concert as a foursome opening for Peter Murphy at Southern Star Amphitheater. They played concerts in Texas as a foursome for two years. Along with the three founders and newest member Max Schuldberg, the band added producer Stephen Bogle as guitarist to complete the line up. The band recorded and produced "Grip" under their own start up label, Gut Records. "Grip" went on to sell 15,000 units with the help of a crafty rework of Bad Company's "Feel like Makin Love". Universal Records, at the time a brand new start up label, heard of the success of "Grip" and signed the band as their second artist ever. "Devil Thumbs a Ride", the 3rd album, had already been recorded and mastered and was about to be manufactured for another self-release when Universal stepped in to sign the band and release the album as-is.

The Hunger had a hit song in 1996, "Vanishing Cream", from the Devil Thumbs a Ride CD, which received heavy airplay on rock stations and reached No. 10 on the Mainstream Rock charts. After two years of constant touring, the band finally stopped to record their second release with Universal Records, "Cinematic Superthug". After only moderate success with the single, "Moderation", the band asked to be and was granted a release from their contract from Universal Records. Two songs, "Shoot to Kill", also from Devil Thumbs a Ride, and "If", from Grip, reached No. 42 on Billboard's Dance/Club Play chart. The band has released six albums: two on Universal Records and four on independent labels. Former original drummer (1991-2003) Max Schuldberg (voted 2002's Best Drummer by the Houston Press Music Awards) parted with the band after the five albums in 2003 and moved to Los Angeles. Former guitarist and two time Grammy Award nominee (remixer, for his work with D.J. Cubanito) Stephen Bogle now Produces artists in the Metal, Electronic, and Pop genres.

In late 2005 Stephen Bogle parted ways with the band, and Tim Huston was quickly picked up. With having only a few practices with the band they headed on tour with Ten Years. Tim Huston stayed with the band from late '05 till 2013. "The lifestyle was just getting too overwhelming for me to handle. If I would have stayed, who knows what would have happened to me. There was just no off button". In 2013, guitarist Raf Rivera joined the lineup, and the band recorded a new single entitled, "Dominator" that received mixed reviews. Following the departure of Raf Rivera, Tim Huston made a return to the band and they did what The Hunger does and that was tour and continue to play live shows. Eventually Huston was involved in an unfortunate car accident resulting in the band looking for a guitar player for the foreseeable future. In stepped Jeff Smith who was quite familiar with the band having played in other projects with Richie Hey and Alex Slay. There was an immediate dynamic set forth when the group rehearsed and plans were made to record NEW music which turned into an album and new music videos to support such.

They are currently recording another new album in which new songs from it have been released including music videos to support the effort.

== Discography ==
Studio albums

- Leave Me Alone (1991)
- Grip (1993)
- Devil Thumbs A Ride (1996)
- Cinematic Superthug (1998)
- Spaceman's Last Goodbye (2001)
- Finding Who We Are (2005)
- The Hunger (2020)
- Bloodlines (2023)
