= Phillip Martin III =

American rapper

Phillip Martin III (born January 10, 1968) in San Antonio, Texas, also known by the stage name Nino, is an American rapper, producer, director, screenwriter, film editor, entrepreneur and music distributor. Martin has co-authored two books and directed two movies.

Martin's previous stage names include Pony J and Jake. Martin took on the stage name of Nino as part of the Texas rap group PKO (Pounds, Keys and Ounces).

Martin distributes music under the umbrella of Big Ballin Records and Youngsta Records. He has also used various other outside companies to distribute a series of albums of popular music.

== P.K.O. ==
As a teenager, Martin grew up in San Antonio. In the mid-1980s, he made friends with Mark "Magic" Outing and together, along with Robert "AK" Hill and childhood friend Ted "K-Sam" Meadows, they formed the nucleus of the rap group PKO (Pounds, Keys- or kilos, and Ounces, a reference to the weights at which drugs are bought and sold). PKO performed at local nightclubs and parties and developed a strong fan base. They began to release singles under their independent label, Youngsta Records.

In 1992, PKO gained notoriety when CNN interviewed the group about the controversy surrounding their underground hit single Shoot the Police. After the release of the single, PKO recorded their first full-length EP, Don't Fuck With Texas. In 1994, they released The Good, the Bad, the Mafia, which has sold 300,000 units to date and peaked at No. 64 on Billboard's album charts. After their CNN appearance, PKO performed with N.W.A, the Geto Boys and Too Short. Master P invited PKO to contribute a single to the October 31, 1995 release of Down South Hustlers: Bouncin' and Swingin'. PKO is credited with track #9 on the album, Got It Sowed Up. The album reached No. 139 on Billboard 200 and #13 on Billboard's Top R&B/Hip-Hop charts.

Martin and fellow PKO member "Magic" Mark recorded a diss towards DJ Quik entitled San Antonio Ain't Shit Like Compton in response to Jus Lyke Compton, a track on which DJ Quik compared San Antonio to Compton. The track San Antonio Ain't Shit Like Compton appeared on 1994's Tha Good, Tha Bad, Tha Mafia.

PKO declined recording deals with major labels and remained an independent label. Throughout the 1990s PKO released their own albums as well as those of other artists on their label, Youngsta Records. Martin later went solo, and his debut album, Nino, sold 100,027 units and hit No. 84 on the Billboard Rap Charts.

PKO is most remembered as the Southern/Texas group equivalent to NWA.

== Big Ballin' Records ==
In 2008 Martin co-wrote two books with real estate agent Mechelle Bower: Faith and Finance and 10 Easy Steps in Creating Success and Wealth as a Real Estate Agent. Martin and Bower collaborated again on the creation of "Born2flyy Ent", based in Atlanta, Georgia. Born2flyy Ent specializes in pop and rhythm and blues artists. One of their former clients is Mika Means of the Universal Motown record label.

== Albums with P.K.O. ==
- (1989) Don't Fuck with Texas
- (1990) Armed and Dangerous
- (1992) They Scared of a Nigga
- (1994) Old School
- (1994) Tha Good, Tha Bad, Tha Mafia
- (1996) No Pain No Gain
- (2000) From Dirty to Clean
- (2001) Ain't Went No Where
- (2006) Greatest Hits: Still Big Ballin'
- (2006) Still Big Ballin': Screwed
- (2006) Live in Japan

== See also ==
- History of African Americans in San Antonio
- Southern Hip Hop
