= Weltklang (musical duo) =

German musical duo

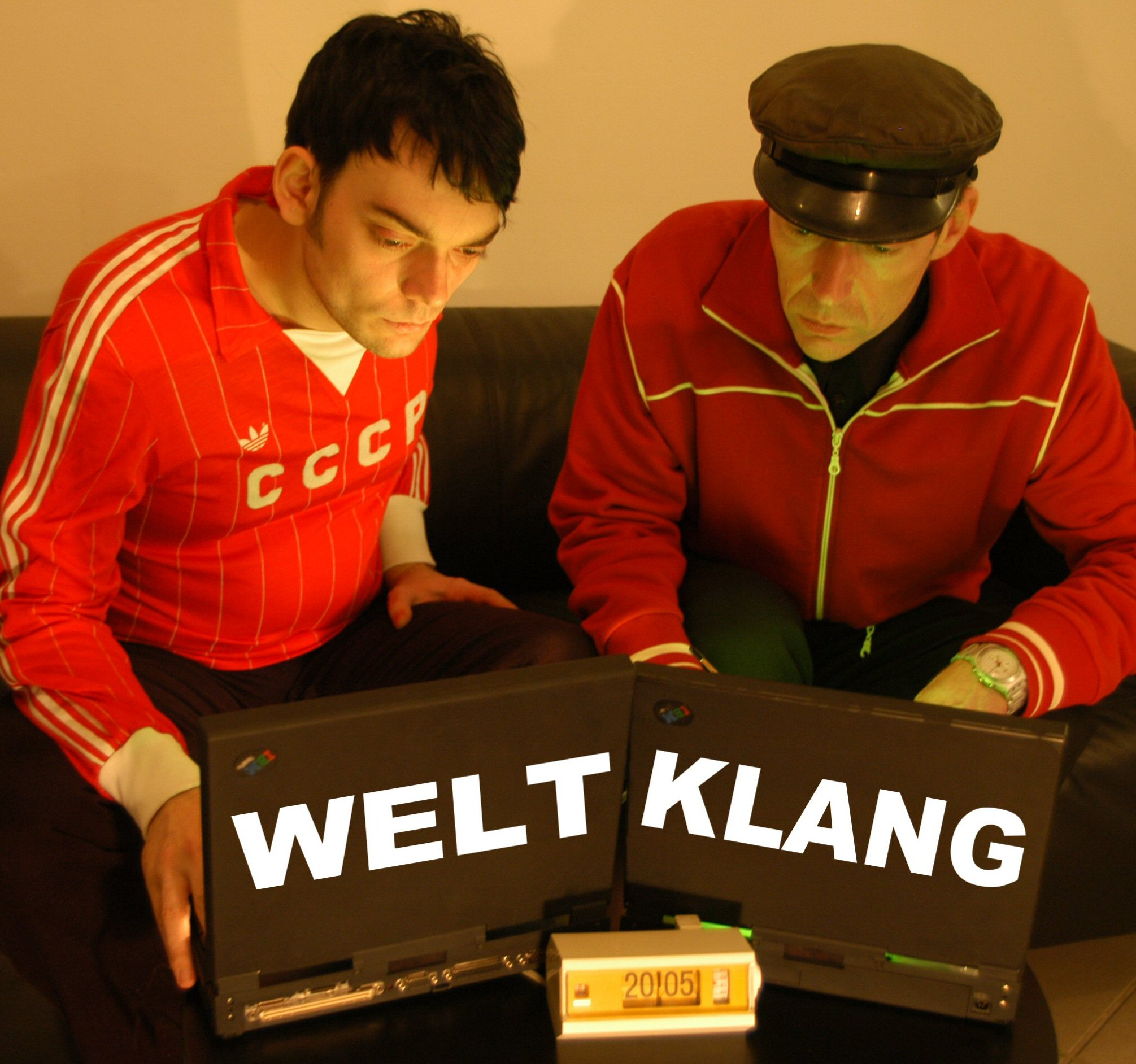
- Weltklang, 2004.

Background information
- Origin: West Berlin, Germany
- Genres: Electronic, Neue Deutsche Welle, German punk, minimal wave, electronica, new wave, EBM
- Years active: 1980–present
- Label: Exil-System (self-published)
- Members: Thomas Voburka; René Steuns

Weltklang is a German electronic music project founded by Austrian musician Thomas Voburka in West Berlin in 1980, using a fictional East German band biography. After a hiatus, Voburka reformed the project as a duo with René Steuns in 2004.

== Band biography ==
=== Beginnings in West Berlin (1980) ===
In 1979, Thomas Voburka (born 1956 in Vienna) founded the West Berlin-based electronic music label Exil-System which also released material of P1/E, a band he played in together with Alexander Hacke. In 1983, Voburka had a minor appearance in the movie A Woman in Flames.

=== Fictional East German band biography ===
According to Voburka, Weltklang was formed in the East German town of Schwerin in 1980, when Voburka released the Minimal wave track VEB Heimat on his label Exil-System. Weltklang was an East German musical instrument brand manufactured in Markneukirchen. The first half of the song title VEB Heimat refers to Volkseigener Betrieb, a state owned workplace or establishment in the German Democratic Republic, the second word Heimat is part of the repetitive vocal line "Heimat bist du großer Söhne" ("Thou art home to great sons"), a quote from the National anthem of Austria.

Voburka wrote a letter to West German music magazine Sounds pretending that his label had recorded two technology students from Schwerin, which the magazine did not fact check. A positive review in Spex magazine was written by a critic who knew that the story was fabricated. It said that the track recorded by East German underground musicians had been smuggled from East Berlin.

According to Voburka, the idea of a fictional East-German punk band was born after a day trip to East Berlin.

In 2018 "VEB Heimat" was chosen by JD Twitch for his German post-punk compilation "Kreaturen der Nacht" ("Creatures of the Night"), released on Strut Records and distributed by !K7 Music. In a taz newspaper review, Weltklang were described as the only East German band ("einzige Ostband") represented on the compilation.

=== Duo (2004–present) ===
On the occasion of Weltklang's 25th anniversary, in 2004 Voburka decided to reform the project, together with London-based programmer, producer and engineer René Steuns from Cologne. They decided to maintain the fictional band biography Voburka had created and performed as a band from the former GDR at Remember Of The Past festival in Waregem, Belgium. Most of their promotional activities were done through Myspace.

They have produced various remixes for artists such as Aeronautica, Alter Ego, Asmodeus X, Fall Of Saigon, Kinder Aus Asbest, Mono 45UPM, P1/e, Plastic Japanese Toys, Soldout and Sonnenbrandt as well as the "Liebesgrüsse aus Ost-Berlin" compilation album.

In 2009 the remixes were bundled on the 2x12" "Weltklang - Remixes", released on Exil System. In 2019 the album "Klášter" and the 12" "Vorwaerts" were released on Exil-System. Due to the 40th anniversary in 2020, the single sided 4" "Freundschaft" was released on vinylograph. In 2021 the 12" "Rueckwaerts" and the 2x12" "Vorwaerts/Rueckwaerts" were released on Exil-System.

The 6 Tracks of the 2022 Weltklang album "Weltraum", released on Exil-System, were mainly recorded by Voburka between 1972-1976 and edited by him in 2021. Instruments used on this record are the Arp Odyssey, Moog Sonic Six and the Roland Space Echo.

In 2022 the Album "Musik for Plattenbauten" can be Seen as the main Release of the Year.

In 2023 they released the 5track EP "New Economy", the 2x12" Brain/Bad Brain, as well as the cassettes "Körper Musik" and "Weltzeituhr"

In 2024 "Musik für Synthesizer" on Vinyl and "Sport" and "Monöhead" on CC would come out.

== VEB Heimat (1980) ==
Weltklang's first release, the 7” single “VEB Heimat/Hoffnung / Sehnsucht ??” was brought out in 1980. Inspired by the fast rise of Neue Deutsche Welle and by the Punk subculture's DIY attitude Voburka's main principle was to remove all dispensable ornamentation and polish from his music, and to use the simplest and most minimalist structures. On "VEB Heimat" for instance he made sole use of a simple Roland SH09 Synthesizer line, a stripped down monophonic analogue synthesizer from Roland Corporation's classic SH-series. The song was based upon a minimalist, filtered bass sequence. In addition to this sparse backing, the track featured a furious and repetitive vocal line by Voburka.

After initial slow sales, the unique “VEB Heimat” managed to achieve an international cult status over the following years, particularly within the Minimal wave and Minimal Electro music scene.

Weltklang has since then often been referred to by artists such as DJ Hell or Optimo (Espacio). In 2003,"VEB Heimat" made it into the top 3 of DJs Hell's charts of the year. Ever since its original release in 1980 “Veb Heimat” has been re-released on numerous occasions, primarily for compilation albums. Apart from its integration in compilation albums such as 80's Minimal Electronics (Volume 1), Return Of Flexi-Pop 3 (Tribute To Flexi-Pop 13) and Call Of The Banshee (1994), in 2003 "VEB Heimat" was also used as opening track for DJ Hell's successful "New Deutsch" compilation which was released on International DeeJay Gigolo Records.

== Discography ==
Selected Releases:

Release	Format	Label	Year
Weltklang - Veb Heimat / Hoffnung Sehnsucht ??	7"	Exil-System	1980
Weltklang - Exil-System Remixed	12"	Pripuzzi	2005
Weltklang - Veb Heimat (Demo)	7"	VOD	2007
Weltklang - Remixes	2x12"	Exil-System	2009
Weltklang - Klášter	12"	Exil-System	2019
Weltklang - Vorwaerts	12"	Exil-System	2019
Weltklang - Freundschaft	4"	Vinylograph	2020
Weltklang - Rueckwaerts	12"	Exil-System	2021
Weltklang - Vorwaerts/Rueckwaerts	2x12"	Exil-System	2021
Weltklang - Weltraum	12"	Exil-System	2022
Weltklang - Musik für Plattenbauten feat. Kinder aus Asbest	12"	Exil-System	2023
Weltklang - Aguirre	7"	Exil-System	2023

Tracks Appear On:

Release	Track	Format	Label	Year
Call Of The Banshee	Weltklang - VEB Heimat	CD	Sub Terranean	1994
Deutsch Magazine (By Terranova)	Weltklang - VEB Heimat	CD	-	2003
New Deutsch	Weltklang - VEB Heimat	2LP	International Deejay Gigolo	2003
New Deutsch	Weltklang - VEB Heimat	CD	International Deejay Gigolo	2003
The Japanese Gigolo Inferno	Weltklang - VEB Heimat	2CD	Music Mine Inc.	2003
Exil-System 1979–2004	Weltklang - Hoffnung / Sehnsucht ??	12"	VOD	2004
Exil-System 1979–2004	Weltklang - 49 Second Dance	12"	VOD	2004
Exil-System 1979–2004	Weltklang - VEB Heimat	12"	VOD	2004
Liebesgrüsse Aus Ost-Berlin	Weltklang - VEB Heimat (EKSS Remix)	12"	Exil-System	2006
Classic Electro	Weltklang - VEB Heimat	CD	Electro Emotions	2008
Classic Electro	Weltklang - Visions	CD	Electro Emotions	2008
Classic Electro	Weltklang - VEB Heimat (Simon Colon Mix)	CD	Electro Emotions	2008
Classic Electro	Weltklang - Auferstanden aus Ruinen (Aeronautica Remix)	CD	Electro Emotions	2008
So Low	P1/E - 49 Second Romance (Weltklang Remix)	2LP	The Vinyl Factory	2016
So Low	P1/E - 49 Second Romance (Weltklang Remix)	CD	The Vinyl Factory	2016
JD Twitch - Kreaturen der Nacht	Weltklang - VEB Heimat	2LP	Strut	2018
JD Twitch - Kreaturen der Nacht	Weltklang - VEB Heimat	CD	Strut	2018
Exil-System 1979-2023 HIT	Weltklang - TikTok	12"	Exil-System	2023
Exil-System 1979-2023 HIT	Weltklang - Dukovany	12"	Exil-System	2023
Exil-System 1979-2023 HIT	Weltklang - Polaroid	12"	Exil-System	2023
Exil-System 1979-2023 HIT	Weltklang - Tanzmusik	12"	Exil-System	2023

Unofficial Releases:

Release	Track	Format	Label	Year
Return Of Flexi-Pop Vol. 3	Weltklang - Hoffnung / Sehnsucht ??	CD	Flexi-Pop	
80's Minimal Electronics, Volume 1	Weltklang - VEB Heimat	LP	-	
