= Worldwide (rapper) =

American rapper

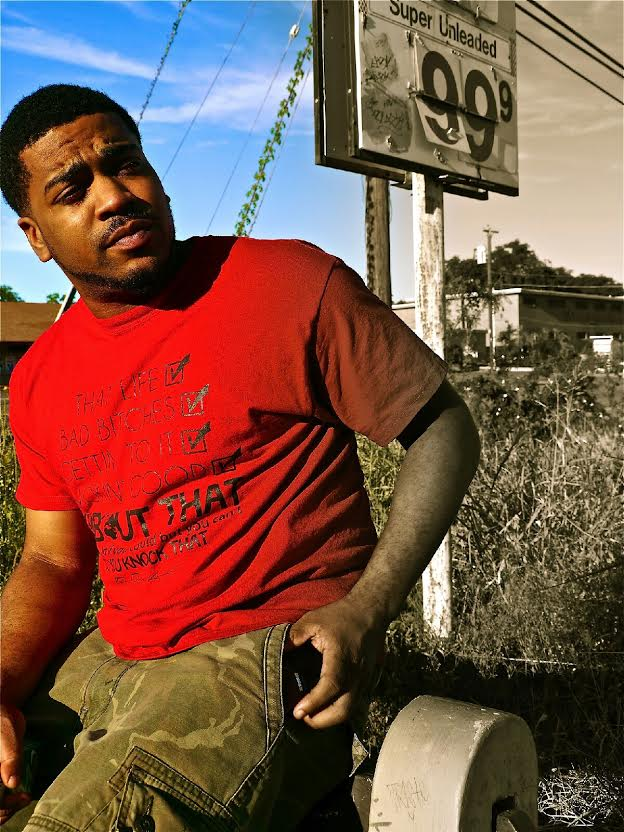

Background information
- Also known as: Worldwide210, World Wide
- Born: Michael Parker; March 2, 1986 (age 40); Los Angeles, California
- Origin: San Antonio, Texas, U.S.
- Genres: Hip hop, Southern hip hop
- Occupations: Rapper, producer
- Years active: 2009–present
- Label: Timele$ Crew
- Website: timelesscrew.tumblr.com

Michael Parker (born March 2, 1986), better known by the stage name Worldwide, is an independent rapper, emcee, music producer & hip hop artist from San Antonio, Texas.

In February 2012 he participated in a Red Bull sponsored tour of Texas featuring up-and-coming artists from the state such as Dallas duo A.Dd+ and fellow Central Texan rapper Kydd Jones. Worldwide opened for the Official XXL Freshmen Showcase for SXSW 2012, the StubHub Live Showcase with Big K.R.I.T. for SXSW 2013, was a performing artist for A3C 2012 & 2013 in Atlanta, Georgia and also performed at the Boiler Room Houston RapLife Showcase. He toured nationally alongside Rittz & the LOEGz in 2012, then toured nationally with Doughbeezy & Killa Kyleon in 2013. In 2014, Worldwide performed at the inaugural Weird City Hip-Hop Festival in Austin and coheadlined with Houston rap legends such as E.S.G. and K-Rino at the Optimo Radio Official SXSW Showcase. He released two projects in 2012, As the World Turns (which was later chopped and screwed by DJ Candlestick and OG Ron C) and Ga$ Money. In 2016, Worldwide released the Lets Talk About It EP with fellow San Antonio emcee Bamsworth Belli; he followed up with an LP, Castles Made of Sand, later that year.

== Discography ==
- As the World Turns (2012)
- Ga$ Money (2012)
- Lets Talk About It EP (2016)
- Castles Made of Sand (2016)

=== Guest appearances ===
- Kydd - "Too Thoed" featuring Worldwide (2012)
- LE$ - "Hindsight" featuring Rob Bass, Easy Lee & Worldwide (2012)
- Deezie Brown - "Gold Money" featuring Tank Washington & Worldwide (2012)
- King Kyle Lee - "Ridin Thru My City" featuring Worldwide (2012)
- Cory Kendrix - "Hold It In" featuring Sertified & Worldwide (2013)
- Tunk - "Smoke One" featuring Worldwide (2013)
- Sertified - "Drug 2 Me" featuring Reggie Coby & Worldwide (2013)
- S.Miller - "PODM2" featuring Rapsody & Worldwide (2014)
- Trakksounds - "Dreamers" featuring Scotty, Roosh Williams, Delorean & Worldwide (2014)
- Ike - "Skyline" featuring Worldwide (2014)
- Greg G - "Runnin" featuring KiiKii Star & Worldwide (2014)
- Dowrong & Eric Dingus - "G Shit" featuring Worldwide (2014)
- B. Dolan - "Seat at the Table" featuring Worldwide (2015)
- Polygrafic - "21 Gun Salute" featuring Kyle Lee, SoSanAntone, Danja, J-Young & Worldwide (2015)
- J. Money - "Sooner Than Later" featuring Worldwide (2015)
- Tank Washington - "Drunk" featuring Killa Kyleon & Worldwide (2017)
