= Dresden 45 =

Dresden 45 was a hardcore punk and crossover thrash band from Houston, Texas, also known as D'45 and variantly, D45. They were one of the first hardcore bands to implement a guitar-driven heavy metal sound into their music. Like other Houston bands Dirty Rotten Imbeciles and Verbal Abuse, Dresden 45 played a breathless, high-speed type of hardcore punk now referred to as thrashcore.

The band's album, Paradise Lost, received a three-star rating from the Austin Chronicle.

== History ==
Formed in 1985 or 86. Last release dated 1993, though last live performance was in 1989.

== Members ==
- Brumby Boylston - vocals
- Patrick Godbey - guitar
- Uncle Charlie Hardwick - bass, vocals
- Oscar T. Gray - drums
- Scott Daniels - bass

== Discography ==
=== Releases ===
- Liberators 7"
- Swiss Bank Account 7"
- Paradise Lost LP
- Blooddump 7"
- Double Against 7"
- Paradise Lost (expanded) - CD Reissue - Arclight Records

=== Compilations ===
- Attack Is Now Suicide
- Houston Loud
- Axiom Live
