= Cadillac Muzik =

American funk and hip hop band

- Origin: San Antonio, Texas
- Genres: Alternative hip hop; alternative R&B; psychedelic funk; Southern hip hop; funk; psychedelic soul; psychedelic rock
- Occupations: Rappers, singers, songwriters, record producers
- Instruments: Guitar, bass, drum machine, synthesizer, keyboard, vocals
- Years active: 2003–present
- Label: Bona Fide Mindz Entertainment
- Website: itscadillacmuzik.com

Cadillac Muzik is an American psychedelic soul/funk & alternative hip hop band from San Antonio, Texas, which specializes in music producing, live performance, & songwriting. The band is composed of San Antonio-based artists Beseja B. "CaddyMack" Moses and Scott Anthony "DaddyDvil" Campbell. Cadillac Muzik was inspired by Moses' uncle Jimmy Sampson, who was a member of Ohio Players.

Raised on the east and west sides of San Antonio, Moses and Campbell got their start rapping with family members in the group THK (Texas Hard Knocks) in 2003 until ultimately finding their Southern Soul sound in 2010. According to San Antonio Express-News, Cadillac Muzik is one of San Antonio's most powerful black artists.

== Music career ==
=== 2014–2017 ===
In 2014, the band released FunkyLand. The band released Vibration in 2016, followed by Mind Play in 2017. Mind Play has charted #8 on the European Indie Top 200 Charts and number 40 on the DRT National Airplay Top 150 chart. Cadillac Muzik has also made appearances on San Antonio Current Magazine in May 2017, and Texas Public Radio in August 2017 as well.

=== 2018–2020 ===
A pause in their release schedule ended in 2018 with Lac Gospel, which registered on Billboard's R&B Album Sales chart. Moses and Campbell quickly followed up the next year with Groove Nation. The EP hit several Billboard Magazine charts, including Heatseekers and Independent Albums. The band quickly peaked at #12 on the Billboard R&B Album Sales Charts for their project titled Lac Gospel. The following year in 2019, they ranked #10 for R&B Album Sales, #22 for Heatseekers Albums, and #45 for Independent Albums Sales for their project Groove Nation. In 2020, the band released an album titled Playa Innovators. Ending the year in 2020, the band released a single titled "Gamble Love" which peaked at #86 on Cashbox Top 200 Airplay Charts and #5 on Cashbox Top 150 Independent Airplay Charts.

=== 2021 ===
Cadillac Muzik produced their 5th independently released project titled "Stayin Alive." May 2021, Cadillac Muzik's "Lac Gospel" album made the San Antonio Current list for 20 albums recorded in San Antonio that every music fan should know. May 14, 2021 Cadillac Muzik released their long-awaited EP "O.G. Style". The project was dedicated to their late eastside uncle Charles “Black Beamus” Williams. July 2021, The duo followed up the previous project with their single "SpaceCowboy", which was a collaboration with MoonShyne Brown.

=== 2023 ===
Beseja “CaddyMack” Moses who is the lead singer, producer, and songwriter of the collective released “El Dorado Sky”. This would make El Dorado Sky the first record the band had released since their last independently released song “SpaceCowboy”. February 22, Cadillac Muzik and Garrett "Starchild Jr" Shider released "Brain UnChain. According to LA Weekly, the band was considered one of the hottest artists to watch in 2023.

== Collaborations ==
In 2023, Beseja “CaddyMack” Moses of Cadillac Muzik & Garrett “Starchild Jr” Shider of Parliament-Funkadelic teamed up. Moses, the nephew of Jimmy Sampson (Ohio Players Drummer) and Shider, the son of Garry Shider (P-Funk lead guitarist) fused psychedelic funk and modern alternative R&B to create "Brain UnChain".

== Discography ==
=== Albums ===
- FunkyLand (2014)
- Lac Gospel (2018)
- Groove Nation (2019)
- Playa Innovators (2020)
- Stayin Alive (2021)
- O.G. Style (2021)

=== Singles ===
- Vibration (2016)
- Mind Play (2017)
- Cerebral Celebration (2020)
- Gamble Love (2020)
- SpaceCowboy (2021)
- El Dorado Sky (2023)
- Brain UnChain (2023)
