= The Black Math Experiment =

Musical band from Houston, Texas, USA

- The Black Math Experiment: left to right, Bill Curtner, Chris Soliz, Jef With One F, Christi Lain, Captain Mongo Nelson (behind) and Brian Coleman

Background information
- Origin: Houston, Texas US
- Genres: Alternative rock
- Years active: 2004–2008
- Members: Bill Curtner; Brian Coleman; Christi Lain; Jef With One F
- Past members: Chris Soliz; Captain Mongo Nelson; Justin Nemeti

The Black Math Experiment is a band described as a unique blend of 1980s synthpop and new wave music with similarities to "The B-52's crossed with Berlin, The Dead Milkmen, and Talking Heads." Based in Houston, Texas in 2004, the band is known for their offbeat pop songs with irreverent or strange lyrics (for example, "Evil Wizard Jesus"). They are known for elaborate live shows that integrate multimedia such as televisions endlessly running odd videos, evangelical-like pamphlets and baptisms, Christmas presents, and a toilet paper cannon, all led by the inexhaustible energy of lead singer Jef With One F (Jef Rouner). They received notoriety with their song, "You Cannot Kill David Arquette".

== History ==
The Black Math Experiment was founded by Bill Curtner in Houston, Texas in 2004 with Curtner on guitar, Captain Mongo Nelson (Captain Matthew Nelson) on bass guitar, Brian Coleman on drums (2004–), Chris Soliz on keyboards/synthesizers and Jef With One F (Jef Rouner) and Christi Lain singing lead vocals. The band was formed from the remnants of a previous band called Cosmonaut Down with Lain and Jef replacing the previous lead vocalist. The Black Math Experiment debuted at a club called Helios in Houston on December 18, 2004. The following year they put out their debut EP, What We Do... Is Secret.

The band rose to notoriety with its 2005 release Fake Words and Signs From Space. The release's eponymous track is the band's most popular downloaded single. Notably, it also featured the sarcastic song "You Cannot Kill David Arquette", which was inspired by Curtner's fascination with the resiliency of Arquette's movie characters. This song led to an informal collaboration with the object of the song and a makeshift Arquette altar at live shows. A second single, "Laugh Track", became the theme music for the Dial-A-Joke segment on British KidsCastUK. In a review, Joey Guerra of the Houston Chronicle described the band as a "snappy, sarcastic sextet" “equal parts neo-new wave rock outfit, irreverent comedy troupe and kitschy musical theater act."

Their next release in November 2006, Last Transmission from the Blue Room, was well received by critics, seeming "a natural progression for the band." The album included a re-recording of the Arquette song as well as a cover of "Science Fiction/Double Feature" from the movie The Rocky Horror Picture Show. It also featured a remix of the song "Ruler of the Rock Robots (A Love Story)" by Asmodeus X, retitled "Ruler of the Trance Robots". Following the album's completion, Chris Soliz left the group as a full-time member to pursue other projects, but remains an occasional collaborator.

Starting late in 2006, Black Math Experiment songs such as "Ohio" regularly began making the playlists of Houston area radio stations such as KPFT and KTRU.

In 2008, the band won the Houston Press Music Award for "Best Unclassifiable Band". That same year they went on "indefinite hiatus."

=== The Black Math Experiment and David Arquette ===
David Arquette posing with the Black Math Experiment; from left, Bill Curtner, Captain Mongo Nelson, Jef With One F, David Arquette, Christi Lain with Brian Coleman behind at wheel of limo

The band's 2005 song "You Cannot Kill David Arquette" was commended by its subject, David Arquette, who sent the band a box of gourmet cupcakes in thanks and much later, the 1965 Ford Econoline van used in his movie The Tripper. Since then, Arquette has occasionally promoted the band, including during an interview on MTV’s Total Request Live (TRL). The song was also featured on MTV's Ridiculousness. On March 27, 2007, during a national tour to promote The Tripper, the actor stopped in Houston to promote the band and joined them onstage in a performance. The band's music was later used to accompany the B-roll in the DVD release of the film.

=== Side projects ===
Curtner splits time with the Houston-based alternative rock band, The Abyss, and founded a second band with Jef With One F called The Ghost of Cliff Burton in 2009. In 2004, Jef With One F recorded " Wicked Little Town (Reprise)" with Asmodeus X for a production of Hedwig and the Angry Inch.

== Members ==
- Jef With One F (Jef Rouner)– lead vocals, keyboards (2004–2008)
- Christi Lain – lead vocals, keyboards (2004–2008)
- Bill Curtner – guitar, keyboard, vocals (2004–2008)
- Brian Coleman – drums (2004–2008)
- Chris Soliz – keyboards, synthesizers (2004–2006)
- Captain Mongo Nelson (Captain Matthew Nelson)– bass guitar, vocals (2004–2007)
- Justin Nemeti – bass guitar (2007–2008)

== Discography ==
=== Albums and EPs ===
- What We Do... Is Secret (E.P.), 2005
- Fake Words and Signs From Space, 2005
- Last Transmission from the Blue Room, 2006
- Live From the Five Minute Hallway, Vol. 1, 2007
- All You Need is Blood, 2007

=== Compilation appearances ===
- "Lost (Acoustic version)", Make It Matter, (various artists), 2008 – Make Music Matter
