= Richie Branson =

American rapper (born 1985)

- Born: Marcus Brown II; November 18, 1985 (age 40)
- Origin: San Antonio, Texas, USA
- Genre: Nerdcore
- Occupations: Rapper, game designer, music producer
- Years active: 2010–present
- Label: Otaku Gang

Richie Branson (born Marcus Brown II; November 18, 1985) is an American entrepreneur, music producer, game designer, and nerdcore rapper from San Antonio, Texas. His stage name is derived from that of British entrepreneur Richard Branson. He is the Co-Founder and Chief Executive Officer of the entertainment development studio FanArcade. He has also made various ending themes for the Rooster Teeth web series Camp Camp, in which he also voices Jake Stonewall. He is also known as the "Otaku King" and founder of the group Otaku Gang.

== Career ==
=== Beginnings ===
Before gaining notoriety as a nerdcore hip-hop artist, Branson pursued a career as a music producer, eventually switching focus to pursue a career as an artist. In 2011, he signed a recording contract under a partnership between Jagore Music Group and TuTone Entertainment, an imprint owned by an executive at Universal Republic. Months after the release of his first commercial single "Jersey Shore Fist Pump", Branson decided to change directions as an artist and began making nerdcore hip-hop music. He has stated in various interviews that he never really had much of a personal interest in the mainstream music he was making prior to his decision to create music by video games and other nerdy influences. He attributes the start of his nerdcore career to a restroom break he took in December 2011 while playing BioWare's Star Wars: The Old Republic. Upon his return to his desk, he heard the game's main theme music and was inspired to make a hip-hop song based on it.

=== Cold Republic and The Letter To Squaresoft ===
In February 2012, he released a free EP titled The Cold Republic – Episode I: The Empire Likes Rap, a 12-track album based on his gameplay experiences in The Old Republic. The Cold Republic gained Branson notoriety in the nerdcore community after receiving coverage from a variety of major gaming sites, including TheForce.Net, AOL's Joystiq, and IGN's The Jace Hall Show. San Antonio's Fox Network affiliate television station KABB filmed and aired a music video featuring Branson performing "Looking For A Group", a song from his Cold Republic EP. The San Antonio Express-News would later feature the music video on their website. In addition to the live action music video to "Looking For A Group", Branson has released four machinima music videos to various songs from The Cold Republic. Shortly after the release of The Cold Republic, Branson released a single titled "Letter To Squaresoft" in protest to what he felt was a decline in the quality of videogames released by Square Enix. The single received worldwide coverage from gaming news sites, most notably Gawker media's Kotaku. This coverage prompted a response via Twitter from Square Enix's online content manager Ben Bateman.

=== The Wing Zero EP ===
Around the same time as the release of "Letter To Squaresoft", Branson announced he was working on an album based on Mobile Suit Gundam Wing titled The Wing Zero EP. Notable comic writer Rich Johnston personally covered the announcement on his website, BleedingCool.com. The release of the Wing Zero EP gained Branson notoriety from a variety of major players in the anime/manga community. Famed Gundam manga publisher TOKYOPOP featured Branson's gundam-inspired music multiple times on their official Facebook fansite and Twitter prior to and after the EP's release. Anime news and streaming provider Crunchyroll praised The Wing Zero EP as "far more focused" than previous incarnations of anime-inspired rap, "providing a great listening experience despite a few slip-ups along the way". Gawker's tech news site, io9 noted the oddity of a mainstream musician going into nerdcore (rather than the other way around) and hailed one of the album's songs, "Wing Memories", as the "Coolest Gundam Wing Rap Song You'll Hear Today". On numerous occasions, music from The Wing Zero EP has been featured on AOL's ComicsAlliance, The Jace Hall Show, Comics Beat, and a variety of other anime and comic related websites.

==== Reception ====
After Branson's release of two well-received projects a little more than a month apart from each other, Jace Hall himself tweeted the idea that Branson might be one of the busiest artists in nerdcore. Nerdcore Now mentioned Branson as "proving a bit of a dark horse" in the nerdcore scene. In an interview with Whiskey Media's Anime Vice, Branson announced that he was working on a Gundam-based electronic dance music album titled "The Epyon Project. In April 2012, the San Antonio Express-News reported that, in addition to The Epyon Project, Branson is working on a Street Fighter-influenced playable video game mixtape titled Richie vs. Capcom.

=== Bring Back Toonami & The Monster Hunter Tour ===
In May 2012, Branson released "Bring Back Toonami", a song inspired by Adult Swim's Toonami programming block. Adult Swim eventually began using the song in their promotional broadcasts. After announcing Toonami's return to Adult Swim's programming lineup, Adult Swim featured a follow-up song from Branson as the theme music for Toonami's premiere broadcast. Shortly after Toonami's return, Branson embarked on the Monster Hunter Tour, a national tour with MC Chris and Powerglove.

==== Tour controversy ====
During Branson's performance on the tour's show in Philadelphia, MC Chris came on stage and removed a fan from the concert for posting a tweet critical of Branson's performance. Despite Branson thanking the fan for making his show "better", the incident grew viral and attracted national media attention, forcing MC Chris to publicly apologize for the incident.

=== Life After Death Star ===
In later 2015, Branson, along with producer Solar Slim, released a remix mash up LP between the Notorious B.I.G. and Star Wars titled Life After Death Star. This was their first major release together under their group, Otaku Gang. The album quickly gained viral attention and critical acclaim around the internet and new sources, such as Nerdist. The album never received an official release, but bootleg copies have been made, including vinyl records.

== Otaku Gang ==
Branson was given the nickname and title of "Otaku King" earlier on his nerdy rap career. With the release of Life After Death Star, Branson introduced his new group titled Otaku Gang. This group would include Branson, Solar Slim, and graphic designer Plush Giant. The group would later release Marshall vs Capcom (2016), and the OG 64 Mixtape (2016). The group would then go on hiatus, later to return with new members in 2016, along with the launch of their Facebook page. New members included Kadesh Flow, NyteXing, A.O. Lyrical, EyeQ, Creative Mind Frame, KickFlamez, Ish1da, 8th-Light, and The Epitome.

== Game Development ==
In late 2014, Branson again waded into controversy with his first video game Pill Bill, released as a satire of Bill Cosby's sex scandal. In an interview, he stated his "intent was definitely to make the game as absurd and funny as possible, not to trivialize rape, but to use that humor as a motivation for people to continue to talk about the scandal." In 2015, Branson entered the Ludum Dare 72-hour game jam and released Shafed, a game where players control a disgruntled tech employee plotting revenge against his boss. As of May 2015, Branson was working on RhymeQuest, a game targeted for release on PlayStation 4 and PC platforms. After being hired as a game designer by Harmonix Music Systems, and later working for Epic Games as a designer on Fortnite's Festival game mode, he released "Not Like Us: The Game", a viral browser-based game inspired by Kendrick Lamar's hit single "Not Like Us". In 2025, he co-founded the development studio FanArcade, and currently serves as the company's Chief Executive Officer. Since then, he has released gaming collaborations with a variety of high-profile artists, including Eminem, Glorilla, Playboi Carti and Summer Walker.

== Discography ==
=== Albums ===
- From the Underground to the Stars (2020)

=== Production ===
- Chalie Boy – "Let It Drop"
- Bone – "Porn Star"
- Sun feat. Slim Thug – "Round and Round"
- Mega Ran – "First Day Of School"
- Mega Ran – "Everything"

=== EPs ===
- The Cold Republic – Episode I: The Empire Likes Rap (2012)
- The Wing Zero EP (2012)
- OtakuTuesdays Vol. I (2012)
- The NERD EP (2012)
- OtakuTuesdays Vol. II (2012)
- The Ghouls 'N Ghosts EP (with Mega Ran) (2012)
- From Guardia With Love (2013)
- Ghouls 'N Ghosts II (with Mega Ran) (2013)
- OtakuTuesdays Vol. III (2014)

=== Singles ===
- "Jersey Shore Fist Pump" (2011)
- "Letter To Squaresoft" (2012)
- "Bring Back Toonami" (2012)
- "Toonami's Back Bitches" (2012)
- "Super Nintendo, Sega Genesis" (with Mega Ran) (2012)
- "Seig Zeon" (2012)
- "Bring Back Chrono" (2013)
- "MechaGod" (2014)
- "Finish Him" (2014)
- "Aznable Dreams" (2016)
- "MEGA MAN CYPHER" (feat. Mega Ran) (2017)
- "Ask DNA" [IchiGO! 2018 Remix] - Raj Ramayya & Richie Branson (2018)
