= Music of Austin, Texas =

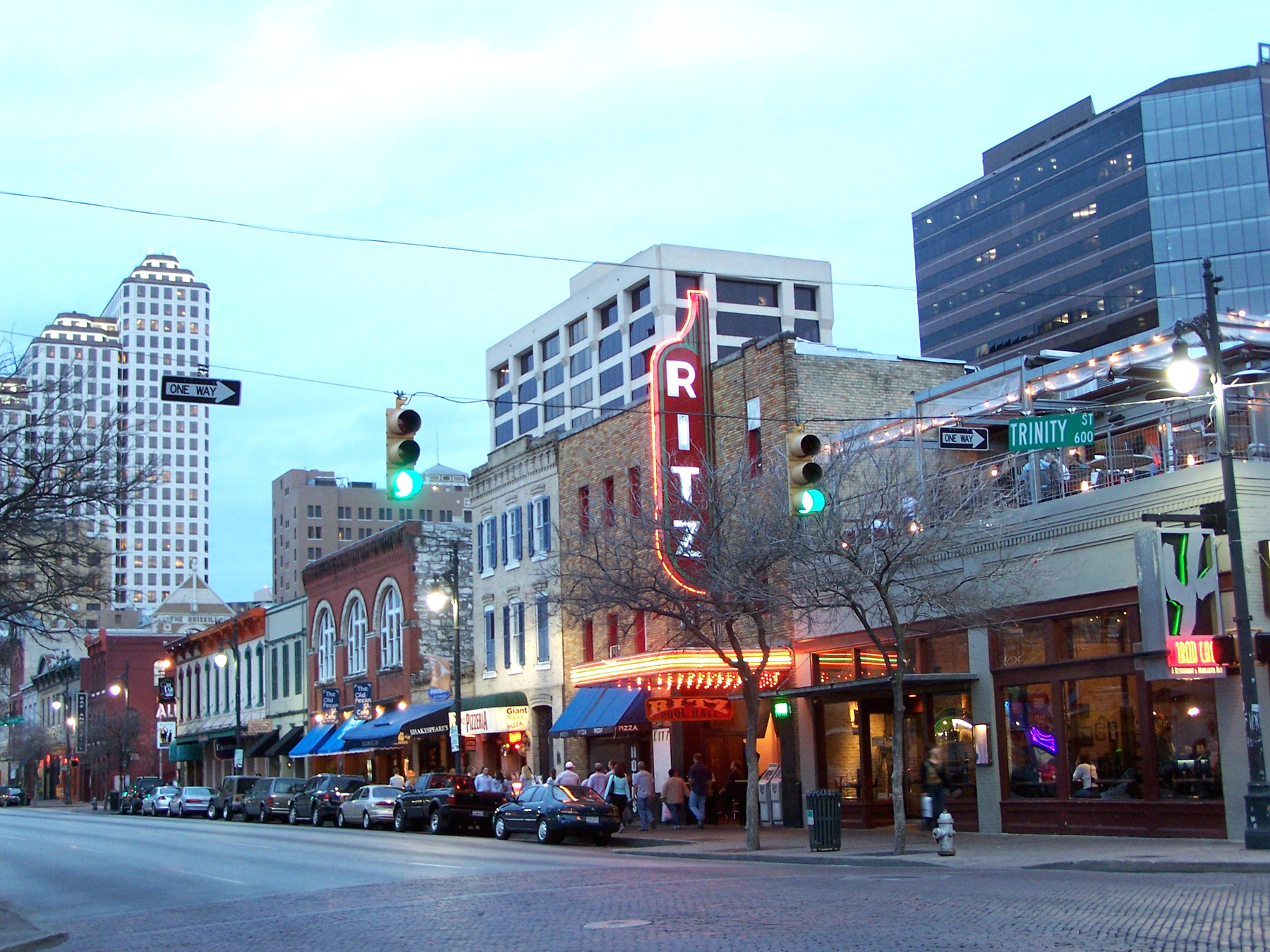
East 6th Street, one of Austin's best known entertainment districts

The official motto of Austin, Texas is the "Live Music Capital of the World" due to the high volume of live music venues in the city. Austin is known internationally for the South by Southwest (SXSW) and the Austin City Limits (ACL) Music Festivals which feature eclectic international lineups. The greatest concentrations of music venues in Austin are around 6th Street, Central East Austin, the Red River Cultural District, the Warehouse District, the University of Texas, South Congress, and South Lamar.

"Austin music" in its modern form emerged in 1972 when "a new form of country music exploded on the scene that turned its back on Nashville and embraced the counterculture", much of it centered around the Armadillo World Headquarters music venue, which opened in 1970, alternating country and rock music shows. In 1972, Willie Nelson left Nashville and moved to Austin.

Austin has folk, blues, jazz, bluegrass, Tejano, zydeco, new wave, punk, and indie music scenes.

The City also hosts the Austin Symphony, Austin Civic Orchestras, Austin Opera, Austin Baroque Orchestra and La Folia Baroque.

== History ==
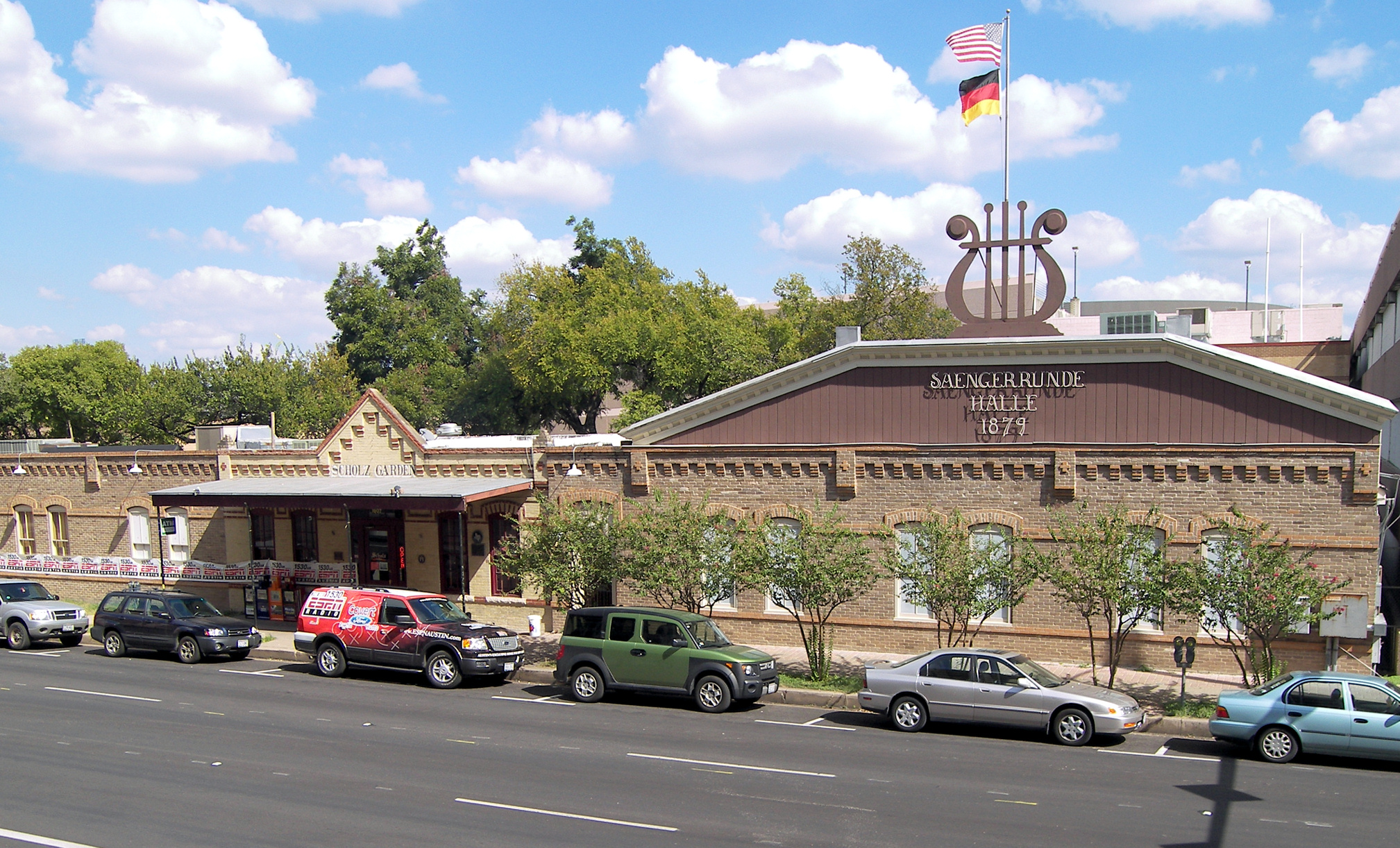
Scholz Garten and Saengerrunde Hall

A large portion of Austin's early musical heritage began in the German Beer Gardens and Halls in the late 1800s, in places such as Scholz Garten and Hall (the hall later to become Saengerrunde Hall) and further up the road at Dessau Hall. Dessau Hall peaked in the 1940s and 1950s with acts as diverse as Glenn Miller, Hank Williams, and Elvis Presley.

Other major venues for country music included Big Gil's on South Congress and The Skyline on North Lamar. Local singer/yodeler Kenneth Threadgill opened Threadgill's in 1933 on North Lamar, a venue that later hosted folk/country jams where Janis Joplin participated in her early days. On the east side of town, which historically had a culture of African American heritage and influence, music venues such as the Victory Grill, Charlie's Playhouse, Big Mary's, Ernie's Chicken Shack, and Doris Miller Auditorium featured local and touring acts. These destinations, which were part of the "Chitlin' Circuit" featuring big bands, jazz and blues, became known for later hosting musical acts including Duke Ellington, Ray Charles, Bobby Bland, B.B. King, Ike Turner and Tina Turner.

In 1964 the Broken Spoke opened, featuring country acts such as Bob Wills, Ernest Tubb, and the young Willie Nelson. The late-1960s and 1970s saw the country music popularized by Willie Nelson and others being joined by a host of other music brought by the more liberal inhabitants, who migrated to Austin during these two decades. Specifically, Roky Erickson and his 13th Floor Elevators helped bring in this psychedelic era.

In the 1960s in Austin, Texas, legendary music venues including the Vulcan Gas Company and the Armadillo World Headquarters and musical talent like Janis Joplin, the 13th Floor Elevators, (Johnny and Edgar) Winter brothers, Shiva's Headband and, later, Stevie Ray Vaughan. Austin was also home to a large New Left activist movement, one of the earliest underground papers, The Rag, and graphic artists like creator Gilbert Shelton, underground comix pioneer Jack Jackson (Jaxon), and surrealist armadillo artist Jim Franklin.

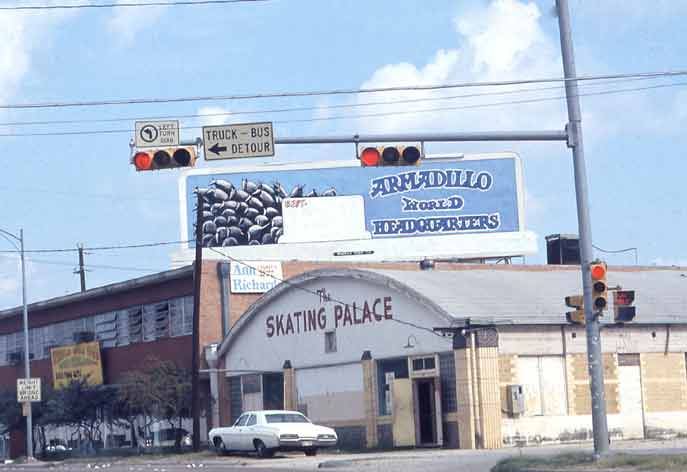
The Armadillo World Headquarters in 1976

The Vulcan morphed into the Armadillo World Headquarters in 1970 and for more than ten years featured music of all genres, from Bruce Springsteen to Bette Midler, as well as local ballet, blues and jazz. The artwork from this establishment was a part of the Austin scene and the Armadillo became the Austin city animal. Songs such as Gary P. Nunn's "London Homesick Blues" (which includes in the chorus "I want to go home with the armadillo") made this a staple of Austin. The artist who began the Armadillo logo was Jim Franklin, who is still working today.

"Austin music" in its modern form emerged in 1972 when "a new form of country music exploded on the scene that turned its back on Nashville and embraced the counterculture". Eddie Wilson had opened the Armadillo World Headquarters music venue in 1970, alternating country and rock music shows, but in 1972, Willie Nelson left Nashville and moved to Austin, following others including Michael Martin Murphey, Marcia Ball, Steve Earle, Gary P. Nunn, Jerry Jeff Walker, Ray Wylie Hubbard, and Waylon Jennings.

Willie Nelson's audiences at the Armadillo included both hippies and rednecks. On New Year's Eve, Austin's local KOKE-FM radio station switched to a new programming format geared to mixed crowds first called "country rock", and later "progressive country".

By November of that year; the first pilot for Austin City Limits was being filmed with Willie Nelson, Billboard Magazine named KOKE "the most innovative radio station in the country," and Austin had a national reputation thanks largely to the reporting of Rolling Stone stringer Chet Flippo, who seemed to get a dispatch from the Armadillo into every issue."

In the following years, Austin gained a reputation as a place where struggling musicians could launch their careers in front of receptive audiences, at informal live venues. A major influence during this time was Clifford Antone and the namesake blues club he founded in 1975, at the age of 25. Antone's located on Austin's 6th Street fostered the careers of a number of musicians, including Stevie Ray Vaughan.

Liberty Lunch was a live-music venue in Austin and during its heyday in the late 1970s and 1980s featured all kinds of music, including reggae and ska, punk, indie, country and rock. The venue was forced to close to make way for Austin's downtown redevelopment in the late 1990s.

Austin's live music scene has experienced a resurgence in the past few years after losing some of its best loved venues (Liberty Lunch, Armadillo and others). A host of new clubs have risen up to continue Austin's live music heritage. However, The Hole in the Wall, open since 1974 and a live music staple that lent a stage to Doug Sahm and Blaze Foley, continues to operate. Places such as the Skylark Lounge, Stubb's, Ginny's Little Longhorn, and a list of others have also become a stalwart of a new generation of live music venues throughout the city.

The punk/new wave era in Austin began in earnest in 1978. The Club Foot played an important role in hosting many of the local punk/new wave acts. The city's first two rock/new wave bands, the Skunks and the Violators, made their debut at a University-area club called Raul's in February.

The explosive show by the Sex Pistols in San Antonio the previous month helped build toward an excited reception for local purveyors of the style. The Skunks' lineup consisted of Jesse Sublett on bass and vocals, Eddie Munoz on guitar and Bill Blackmon on drums. The Violators featured Kathy Valentine (later of The Go-Go's), Carla Olson (later of the Textones), Marilyn Dean and Sublett on the bass. The Violators were short-lived, as all the members except for Sublett moved to LA the following year. Margaret Moser, of the Austin Chronicle, later wrote that "The Skunks put Austin on the rock n' roll map." Other influential bands that led the punk scene in Austin were the Big Boys and D-Day.

Austin became one of the important stops on every tour of important punk/new wave acts. Many of these bands, such as the Police, Joe Jackson, Blondie and Talking Heads, played at the Armadillo. A number of them, including the Clash, Elvis Costello and Blondie, would make appearances at gigs by the Skunks and take the opportunity to jam with the band.

The 1980s and 1990s also helped shape Austin's music scene. Waterloo Records, which has been voted the best independent record store in the country and hosts live in-store shows, first opened in 1982. Austinite Stevie Ray Vaughan won a Grammy in 1990 for best contemporary blues album. After his death in a helicopter crash, he was memorialized with a statue on the shores of Austin's Lady Bird Lake. Additionally in 1991, Austin city leaders named Austin, "The Live Music Capital of the World", because of the number of live music venues.

In 2006, Gibson Guitar brought Guitar Town to Austin, placing 35 ten-foot guitars around the city.

The Austin Music Foundation is one of several Austin groups that help independent artists further their music careers. Assisting musicians with medical needs are the SIMS Foundation and Health Alliance for Austin Musicians (HAAM). Promotion, preservation and education is the mission of the Austin Blues Society, formed in 2006 by Kaz Kazanoff and other blues community notables.

Helping to promote the $1 billion music industry in the city is the Austin Music Office. A department of the Austin Convention & Visitors Bureau, the Austin Music Office offers assistance in booking live music, discounted Austin Compilation CDs and mini-guides to the city's live music scene, assistance with utilization of live music venues for off-site events, and guidance with local music attractions and creation of music tours.

== Television ==
The PBS live music television show Austin City Limits began in 1974 and has featured, as of 2005, over 500 artists of various genres, including rock, folk, country, bluegrass and zydeco. Partly responsible for Austin's reputation as a live music hub, the show is broadcast worldwide and stands as the longest running music television program ever. On February 26, 2011, ACL held its first taping in its new purpose-built Moody Theater and studio in downtown Austin's W Austin Hotel and Residences. Despite a seating capacity of over 2,700, audiences will be limited to around 800 (the original total seating capacity of the old studio). The additional seating capacity will be used for the ACL Live concert series at the venue.

Austin was also home to the Austin Music Network (AMN), which broadcast from 1994 to 2005. AMN, featured on cable channel 15, proclaimed itself to be the only non-profit independent music television channel, and its programming was mostly music videos or recorded live sessions, interspersed with presenters. Although all musical tastes were broadcast, AMN emphasized non-mainstream music such as indie, punk, blues, country and jazz.

Channel 15 was a 24-hour music channel now run by Music and Entertainment Television (M*E). M*E launched October 1, 2005, and was broadcast to Austin and the 44 surrounding cities. M*E was a regional network dedicated to showcasing and providing television exposure for regional artists as well as the hundreds of touring groups that make up the Texas live music scene. M*E represented different musical genres and areas of the arts community with numerous original programs highlighting everything from filmmakers to art galleries, and musicians to the ballet. In addition, M*E's mostly music lineup, spotlighted live performance footage, concept music videos as well as biographies, reviews, restaurant tours and more.

== Festivals ==
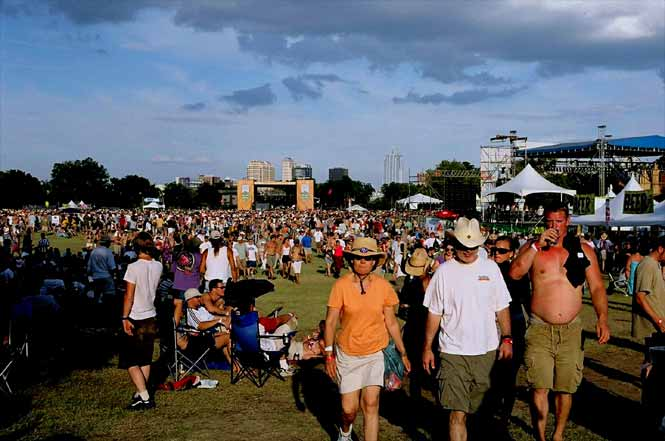
Austin City Limits Music Festival with view of stages and the Austin skyline

Austin is the home of South by Southwest (SXSW), an annual music, film and interactive conference and festival, and the expanding number of fringe events that take place during the festival, at venues all over town. In the fall, Austin hosts the Austin City Limits Music Festival (ACL) and the Fun Fun Fun Fest.

In the spring, the long-running Old Settler's Music Festival takes place at the Salt Lick Pavilion & Camp Ben McCulloch just outside the city. Every summer, Austin City Limits Radio puts on a series of free blues shows in Zilker Park entitled "Blues on the Green. "

Also in the summer, the City of Austin Parks and Recreation Department holds the Hillside Summer Concert Series music festival, throughout the month of July. This is held at the Pan American Recreation Center. This festival was the first DJ to perform at the festival, in 2014.

Numerous other music festivals occur year-round. Other annual festivals include the Keep Austin Weird Festival and the Heart of Texas Quadruple Bypass Music Festival, a.k.a. the Texas Rockfest.

Austin is home to other large annual festivals including:

- Carnaval Brasileiro
- Eeyore's Birthday Party
- Levitation (formerly Austin Psych Fest)
- Oblivion Access Festival
- Old Pecan Street Festival
- Republic of Texas Biker Rally

== Venues ==
The Austin Chronicle, Visit Austin, Do512, and Phosphene Productions offer information on the most common venues that host local bands.

Below is a short list of notable venues:

- The 13th Floor
- Antone's (reopened in new location)
- B. D. Riley's (new location)
- The Backroom
- The Backyard
- Beerland
- The Broken Spoke
- C-Boy's Heart & Soul
- Cactus Cafe (UT campus)
- The Carousel Lounge
- Cedar Street Courtyard
- Central Market
- Central Presbyterian Church
- Cheer Up Charlies
- Club Foot
- Come and Take It Live
- The Continental Club
- Dirty Dog Bar (formerly The Metro)
- Donn's Depot
- Ego's
- Elephant Room
- Elysium Night Club
- Emo's
- Empire Control Room and Garage
- Evangeline Café
- The Far Out Lounge
- Flamingo Cantina
- Friends
- Geraldine's
- Green Mesquite
- Guero's
- The Highball
- Hole in the Wall
- Hotel Vegas/The Volstead
- Icenhauer's
- The Little Longhorn Saloon
- Maggie Mae's
- The Mohawk (formerly the Caucus Club)
- Moody Center
- Moody Theater
- Nutty Brown Café
- One-2-One Bar
- One World Theater
- The Parish
- The Parlor
- Poodies
- Raul's
- Red 7 (now Barracuda)
- The Sahara Lounge
- Saxon Pub
- Scoot Inn
- Shooters
- Skylark Lounge
- Speakeasy
- Spider House Cafe
- Steamboat
- Stubb's BBQ
- Swan Dive
- Tellers
- Vulcan Gas Company
- The White Horse

Other locations that host live music in Austin include:

- City Hall - Every Thursday, City Council honors a local musician at its council meeting. Also, the free concert series "Live from the Plaza" takes place at City Hall every Friday at noon from April to December.
- Austin-Bergstrom International Airport - Live music is featured 11 times a week at four locations.
- Grocery Stores - Central Market features live music three times a week, while Whole Foods Market hosts the "Music at the Market" music series every Thursday evening in the spring.
- Road Races - The Austin Marathon hosts more than 30 bands along the race course and the Capitol 10K features a band at every mile marker.
- House Concerts - Hosting a variety of genres, Austin locals often open their doors to both local and touring musicians, with audiences ranging from a few friends to up to 200.

== Musical acts ==
Austin musicians:

- Alan Haynes
- The Alice Rose
- Alpha Rev
- The American Analog Set
- …And You Will Know Us by the Trail of Dead
- Arc Angels
- ArcAttack
- Asleep at the Wheel
- Asylum Street Spankers
- Austin Lounge Lizards
- Tje Austin
- Averse Sefira
- Balcones Fault
- Marcia Ball
- Balmorhea
- Band of Heathens
- Lou Ann Barton
- Best Fwends
- Beto y los Fairlanes
- Big Boys
- The Black and White Years
- The Black Angels
- Black Heart Saints
- Black Joe Lewis and the Honeybears
- Black Pistol Fire
- Black Pumas
- Blue Cartoon
- Blue October
- The Boxing Lesson
- Doyle Bramhall II
- The Bright Light Social Hour
- Brobdingnagian Bards
- Butthole Surfers
- Ray Campi
- Carpetbagger
- Cindy Cashdollar
- Chaski (Latin American folk music ensemble)
- Gina Chavez
- Chingon
- Gary Clark, Jr.
- Lakrea Clark
- W. C. Clark
- Slaid Cleaves
- Shawn Colvin
- Court Yard Hounds
- Kacy Crowley
- Dangerous Toys
- Jesse Dayton
- Death Is Not a Joyride
- Del Castillo
- The Derailers
- Dexter Freebish
- Dickins
- The Dicks
- The Dixie Chicks
- The Eastern Sea
- Electric Touch
- Joe Ely
- Alejandro Escovedo
- Esther's Follies
- Explosions in the Sky
- The Fabulous Thunderbirds
- Fastball
- Feathers
- Rosie Flores
- Michael Fracasso
- Max Frost
- Full Service
- Future Clouds and Radar
- Davíd Garza
- Larry Gatlin
- Ghostland Observatory
- Eliza Gilkyson
- Jimmie Dale Gilmore
- Golden Arm Trio
- Johnny Goudie
- The Gourds
- Jon Dee Graham
- Patty Griffin
- Grupo Fantasma
- Harlem
- Roy Heinrich
- Terri Hendrix
- Sara Hickman
- Tish Hinojosa
- The Hot Club of Cowtown
- I Love You But I've Chosen Darkness
- Jack Ingram
- Eric Johnson
- River Jones
- Kaleo
- Robert Earl Keen
- Kydd
- Ben Kweller
- Jimmy LaFave
- The Lovely Sparrows
- Lower Class Brats
- The Lucky Strikes
- Lloyd Maines
- Julian Mandrake
- Matt the Electrician
- Carson McHone
- James McMurtry
- MDC
- Mingo Fishtrap
- Missio
- Monte Montgomery
- Abra Moore
- Ian Moore
- Gurf Morlix
- Mother Falcon
- Mothfight
- Trish Murphy
- Willie Nelson
- The Nightowls
- The Noise Revival Orchestra
- Matt Noveskey
- The Octopus Project
- Okkervil River
- One-Eyed Doll
- Paul Oscher
- Ephraim Owens
- The Pictures
- Patrice Pike
- Toni Price
- Pushmonkey
- Quiet Company
- Reckless Kelly
- Recover
- Luke Redfield
- The Reivers
- Riddlin' Kids
- Dax Riggs
- Ringo Deathstarr
- Riverboat Gamblers
- Bruce Robison
- The Rocketboys
- Carrie Rodriguez
- Calvin Russell
- Bob Schneider
- Charlie Sexton
- Shakey Graves
- Shearwater
- Shinyribs
- Slim Richey's Jitterbug Vipers
- Soul Track Mind
- Soulhat
- Spoon
- Stars of the Lid
- Storyville
- Sunny Sweeney
- The Sword
- Owen Temple
- Rick Trevino
- Kathy Valentine
- Vallejo
- Jimmie Vaughan
- Jackie Venson
- Redd Volkaert
- Patricia Vonne
- Voxtrot
- Jerry Jeff Walker
- Tank Washington
- Watchtower
- Dale Watson
- What Made Milwaukee Famous
- White Denim
- White Ghost Shivers
- Bobby Whitlock
- Kelly Willis
- The Wind and The Wave
- Wiretree
- Carolyn Wonderland
- The Yuppie Pricks

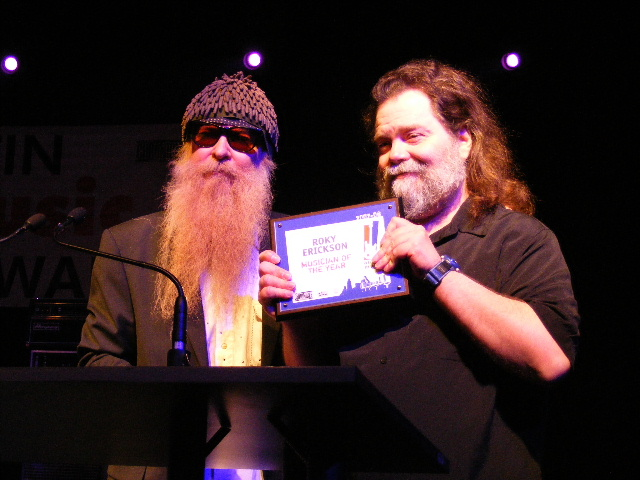

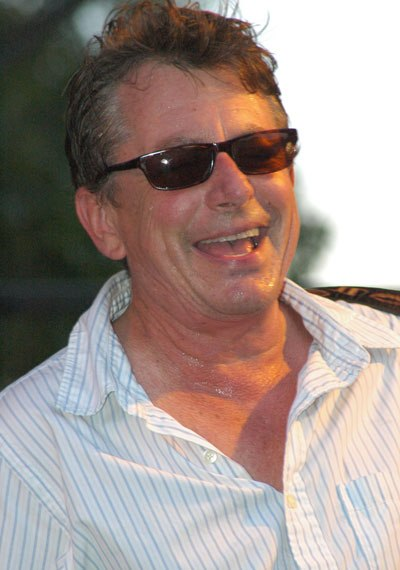
Joe Ely in concert at the Blues On the Green music series, 2006

Musicians who previously contributed to the Austin music scene (including those who died, have broken up, or moved from the city):

- 13th Floor Elevators
- 3D Friends
- Bad Livers
- Dynamite Hack
- Experimental Aircraft
- Gals Panic
- Glass Eye
- Kellye Gray
- Greezy Wheels
- Nanci Griffith
- Marc Gunn
- The Impossibles
- Daniel Johnston
- Poi Dog Pondering
- Charlie Robison
- Scratch Acid
- Shoulders
- Sound Team
- Angela Strehli
- The Sword
- Timbuk3
- Twang Twang Shock-A-Boom
- Two Nice Girls
- Uncle Walt's Band
- Ünloco
- Volcano, I'm Still Excited!!
- Wideawake
- Lucinda Williams

Deceased Austin musicians include:

- Doyle Bramhall
- Stephen Bruton
- Tony Campise
- Pee Wee Crayton
- Nick Curran
- Bobby Doyle
- Keith Ferguson
- Blaze Foley
- Walter Hyatt
- Janis Joplin
- Ian McLagan
- Bill Neely
- Jody Payne
- Pinetop Perkins
- Gary Primich
- Gene Ramey
- Calvin Russell
- Doug Sahm
- Robert Shaw
- Jesse Taylor
- Randy Turner, aka Biscuit
- Townes Van Zandt
- Stevie Ray Vaughan
- Don Walser
- Rusty Wier
- Grey Ghost
- Teddy Wilson

The Austin Music Memorial at the Joe and Teresa Long Center honors those who have contributed to the development of the Austin music community.

== See also ==
- List of radio stations in Austin
