= Pachamama (disambiguation) =

Pachamama is a goddess revered by the Indigenous people of the Andes.

Pachamama or Pacha Mama may also refer to:

- "Pacha Mama" (song), the second movement of Mike Oldfield's 1999 album The Millennium Bell
- Pachamama, a 1944 Argentine film that won two honors at the 1945 Argentine Film Critics Association Awards
- Pacha Mama, highest point on Peru’s island Amantaní in Lake Titicaca
- "Pachamama", single by the Peruvian band Uchpa
- Pachamama (film), a Netflix Original film
- Pachamama, a wasp genus in the family Trichogrammatidae
- Pachamama Cine, Argentine film distributor for the 2007 film La Antena
- Pachamama, 2008 Brazilian documentary directed by Eryk Rocha
- Pachamama, French and Argentine 2018 animated film directed by Juan Antin
- Pachamama, 1986 album by Bolivian quintet Rumillajta
- Pacha Mama, 1991 album by Chaski
- Pachamama, two-part EP released in 2012 by Raine Maida
- Pachamama, a Serbian Latin American music band recorded on the 1996 album Muzičke paralele
- "Pachamama (la terre mere)", 2013 single by French–Armenian singer Patrick Fiori

== See also ==
- Pachamama Raymi, a ceremony held annually in Ecuador and Peru
