= Death Is Not a Joyride =

American experimental art rock band

- Origin: Austin, Texas, U.S.
- Genres: Experimental, indie pop, psychedelia, avant-pop
- Years active: 2006–present
- Members: Lionel Gonzalez; Andrew Noble; Joseph Salazar
- Past members: Kacy Ritter; John Gouda

Death Is Not a Joyride is an Austin, Texas-based experimental art rock three piece. Because of a diverse arrangement of instruments and tendency to explore different genres, the band has been described as having elements of post-rock, punk, goth, indie, trip hop and electronica. In addition to doing their first two tours in 2008, the band recently played at an official SXSW showcase and has played with several notable bands including Gang Gang Dance, The Dresden Dolls, Faun Fables, Titus Andronicus, Xiu Xiu, The Paper Chase, Carla Bozulich, Gram Rabbit and Mothfight.

In December 2009, the band announced that vocalist Kacy Ritter had left the band, and they would continue as an instrumental four piece. Later that month, they released two new songs on their website.

== Discography ==
- The Human Zoo (2008) Self released, recorded and mixed by John Congleton

=== Compilations ===
- "Chiffon Tutu, Dancing Bear" featured on LUCY Magazine Issue 1 Compilation CD (2009) Lucy the Poodle Productions
- "Masochism in the Trade" featured on ATX Underground Volume 1 (2008) ATX Underground

== See also ==
- Music of Austin
