= Carpetbagger (disambiguation) =

A carpetbagger was a derogatory term for American Northerners who moved to the South after the Civil War.

Carpetbagger or The Carpetbaggers may also refer to:

- Operation Carpetbagger, a World War II operation
- The Carpetbaggers, a 1961 novel
  - The Carpetbaggers (film), a 1964 film based on the novel
- Carpetbagger (band), an alt-country, Americana band
- Carpetbagger (politics), American term for a parachute candidate

== See also ==
- Carpet bag, a type of 19th-century travelling bag, usage of which gave rise to the derogatory term for American Northerners who moved to the South after the Civil War
