= Flag of Austin, Texas =

City of Austin
- Proportion: 2:3
- Adopted: April 12, 1919
- Design: White field with the seal of Austin and the text "CITY OF AUSTIN" in blue arched below it
- Designed by: Ray F. Coyle

The city flag of Austin, Texas consists of a white field with the seal of Austin without the surrounding circle of text. Below the seal of Austin is the text "CITY OF AUSTIN", written in blue and arched with the ends facing upwards.

== Design and symbolism ==
Coat of arms of Stephen F. Austin's family, where the crest on the flag is derived from

The flag has a proportion of 2 units tall by 3 units wide. The shield in the center is about 1 unit high and two-thirds of a unit tall and is divided into three even vertical strips of red, white, and red. The top of the shield is a blue isosceles triangle with an orange oil lamp in the middle. The red, white, and blue color scheme symbolizes that it is situated in Texas and the United States, as they both have red, white, and blue as their official colors. The oil lamp symbolizes knowledge and represents the various educational options within Austin, most notably the University of Texas at Austin located in the city (hence the choice of the orange color). Fimbriating the shield is a narrow gold border. The shield's crest rests on a white wreath. The crest consists of a gold latin cross with white wings outlined in blue protruding on either side. This crest is derived from the coat of arms of the city's namesake, Stephen F. Austin. Austin was known as the "Father of Texas" due in large part to his efforts in the colonization and growth of the territory. The cross symbolized that an ancestor of Austin participated in a crusade, while the wings were designed to symbolize Saint Austin, Archbishop of Canterbury, who converted Wales to Christianity. This symbolism would prove important in the 1992 lawsuit. Behind the crest is a silhouette of the Texas State Capitol in red, with a blue outline. This represents its status as the capital city of Texas. Written in blue is the text "CITY OF AUSTIN", which is arched counterclockwise in the bottom third of the flag.

== History ==
The idea for a city flag was first suggested in 1915 by Ellen Wyse, an editor of Gossip. She brought the idea to the attention of mayor Alexander Penn Wooldridge, who organized a committee of 38 people to explore the idea, and soon created a flag design competition, declaring:

By authority of the Mayor of the City of Austin, a committee, appointed by him, hereby institutes a competition for the purpose of securing a design for the flag for the City of Austin. It is desired that as much freedom as possible be allowed in the working out of the designs and in the selection of color. It is, however, essential that the design have artistic merit, that it be simple, and expressive of some salient characteristics of the city. The following suggestions, which in a measure embody the most typical characteristics of the city, have been made and may be used at the discretion of the designer[:] The natural beauty of Austin, the City of the Violet Crown, the lake and dam, the Capital of the State, the dome of the capitol, the seal of the city, an educational center, its industries, the sentiment of the past history, the derivation of the name-from Stephen F. Austin, an expression of the ideals of Stephen F. Austin in symbolic form, the use of the coat of arms of Stephen F. Austin.

The contest offered $50 to the first place design and $25 to the runner-up. By October 2, 1916, the deadline, the contest had received 130 entrants. Out of these 130, the 10-person committee selected the design of Ray Frederick Coyle, an artist from San Francisco, as the first-place winner. Second place went to G.A. Geist, a Texas A&M University faculty member. Coyle's entry became the official flag and seal of the city after a few slight modifications to the design. The original had a shield of red, white, and blue, with the outline of the Capitol building at the top of the shield. The blue triangle came from the Austin family coat of arms and the cross and wings came from Stephen F. Austin's coat of arms. The committee added the oil lamp to represent the aspect of education in Austin, which replace a white star and crown that represented the City of the Violet Crown. The committee also added the wording "CITY OF AUSTIN" in block letters below the shield and the color blue to the lineage of the wings.

The city first began using the design as a flag and seal in 1917, following a shipment of several large and small flags to Scarbrough's Department Store, with one copy being presented to the city. The design was used on city documents, police cars, and other city property. The city copy from Scarbrough's was actually lost, according to a July 20, 1917, Statesman story, although it was later discovered. It was officially adopted by the Austin City Council on April 12, 1919. The resolution said that the flag would be flown on proper occasions. Jane Y. McCallum wrote about the flag in 1944, for her weekly column in the Statesman. In the column, she discussed the flag's lack of use and also questioned people on their knowledge of the existence of an Austin city flag. At some point, the original flag was placed in a desk drawer in the city clerk's office and was eventually discovered by an employee in 1975. The flag was framed and hung at the Old Bakery and Emporium, which served as the headquarters of the bicentennial for the city. The flag was then placed in an archive with all other materials involved with the bicentennial. It currently resides at the Austin History Center and is often displayed in the mayor's office.

The flag placed 62nd out of 150 United States city flags in a 2004 North American Vexillological Association survey, ranking 7th out of 12 Texas cities. The flag was also featured in Roman Mars' viral TED Talk, in which he described it as a "seal on a bedsheet", or a flag with nothing but a seal, an example of bad flag design. Austin (specifically the State Capitol) was home to the 42nd annual NAVA meeting in 2008. Every annual NAVA meeting has an official flag that represents the host city. The flag chosen for Austin was a historic design drawn in 1839. It is a rectangular variant of a square auxiliary naval flag, consisting of a blue bar with a white star in the middle. Surrounding this bar is a thick white bar. Surrounding the white bar is another thick bar, this time in red. This flag represents the state of Texas. As the conference took place in the capitol building, it conveys the importance of Austin as the state's capital city. KXAN, in a 2015 report, found that the city flag is nearly impossible to find and that not even Austin City Hall flies it.

=== 1992 lawsuit ===
The flag once again reached headlines when Jon G. Murray, of the Society of Separationists, sued the city in 1992. Murray claimed that the flag violated the First Amendment, specifically the separation of church and state, due to the depiction of the cross on the shield. Prior to this lawsuit, Zion, Illinois was brought to court by the same group for the same reason and was forced to change its seal, as it was found that it had religious intent. A federal judge decided that as the cross was used in Austin's coat of arms it did not endorse or advance Christianity, but instead showcased historical validity, meaning it followed the first amendment. The plaintiffs appealed the decision and took it all the way to the United States Court of Appeals for the Fifth Circuit and even the Supreme Court, but the higher courts endorsed the previous decisions and did not find the flag unconstitutional.

=== Alternative designs ===
One of the more prominent designs in the flag redesign effort — made by Michael Kriegshauser and published in 2015

An unofficial flag based on the 2025 city logo.

Like many other flags with seals on them, various efforts have been made to redesign Austin's flag. One redesign was posted by Michael Kriegshauser to the design website Medium in 2015, which featured a diagonal strip that separated the flag into two colors, with blue on the left and red on the right, with a white five-pointed star in the canton. Kriegshauser's redesign was featured by the Austin American-Statesman newspaper and KUT radio station. KXAN-TV published a YouTube video featuring the design, along with another proposal from University of Texas student Alec Rios, who took the blue triangle and stripes from the seal and flipped it horizontally, covering the whole height and width of the flag. The oil lamp was then replaced with a white five-pointed star. Inspired by Kriegshauser's post, local event website Do512 orchestrated a flag contest. Despite the coverage, the City of Austin has not made a change to the flag.
