= Kydd (rapper) =

American rapper

Kydd Jones
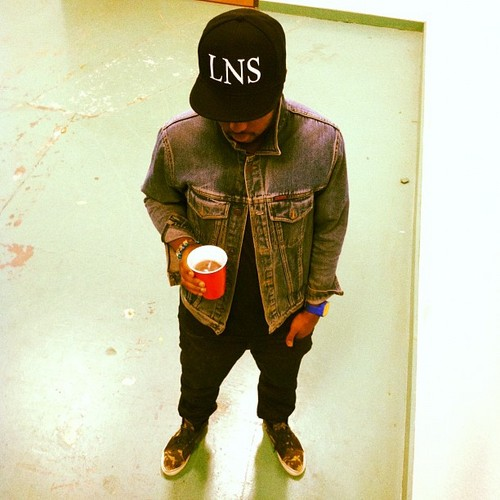

Background information
- Also known as: Kydd
- Born: Randell Obrain Jones
- Origin: Austin, Texas, U.S.
- Genres: Hip hop; R&B
- Occupations: Rapper; singer; record producer
- Years active: 2012–present
- Label: LNS Crew
- Website: lnscrew.com

Randell Obrain Jones, known professionally as Kydd, is an American rapper, producer, and singer from Austin, Texas.

== Career ==
Jones performed at NXNE, The Brooklyn Hip-Hop Festival and Red Bull Sound Select in 2014 while producing for Kirko Bangz on Progression V. During 2015, he released two singles: Patience and Blink Away with Sean Price; he also performed at the Billboard Hot 100 Fest at Jones Beach Theater. After being personally picked by Chuck D to open for The Hip Hop Gods Tour in Los Angeles at The Novo (formerly Club Nokia), Kydd opened for The Art Of Rap Fest at the Lakewood Amphitheatre in Atlanta during 2016. He released Sounds in My Head 2: The Righteous Edition later that year with features from Skyzoo, Yelawolf, Pac Div, A.Dd+, Cory Kendrix, Max Frost, GLC & Tank Washington. Jones performed at SXSW and Austin City Limits Festival in both 2018 and in 2019 with Gary Clark Jr after releasing his album entitled Homecoming as well as an EP with producer Insightful of Soulection. He then followed that up by performing at Blues On The Green during 2020 and 2021 and collaborating with the Round Rock Express to honor native Austinite and Negro league baseball legend Willie Wells and the Austin Black Senators at Dell Diamond. In 2022, Kydd released his new album, Onyx D'Or and was honored in his hometown of Austin, Texas by having September 1 declared Kydd Jones Day.
