= Ben Ballinger =

American singer-songwriter

- Born: The Dalles, Oregon; United States
- Genres: Americana; Folk; Soul; Rock and roll
- Occupation: Singer-songwriter
- Instruments: Vocals guitar
- Years active: 2001–present
- Label: Good Horse Records
- Member of: The Dalles
- Website: benballinger.com

Ben Ballinger is an American folk singer-songwriter based in Austin, Texas. He is best known for his solo career and was recognized by The Austin Chronicle as one of "Austin's top young songwriters".

== Early life ==
Ballinger was born in The Dalles, Oregon. He started writing songs during the seventh grade. His father, Mike, played music at The Dalles Catholic church for more than 30 years.

== Early career ==
Ballinger moved from Portland, Oregon to New York City in 2003. He was part of the anti-folk scene, which included artists such as Regina Spektor, Beck, Hamell on Trial, Paleface, Langhorne Slim and Kimya Dawson. He organized the annual "Schoolhouse Rock Festival" in Friend, Oregon with musician Steve Schecter. In 2011, Ballinger moved to Austin, Texas, where he started a band with Blue Mongeon, Drew Brunetti, and Chris D'Annunzio named The Dalles. The Dalles received media attention for the song, "Lines," from the 2012 album, My Own Private White House. The song was featured on Season 5 of the FX series Sons of Anarchy. The Dalles played Utopia Fest 2012, alongside Dr. Dog, Charles Bradley, Ben Kweller. Ballinger was a featured guest vocalist on the 2013 Carpetbagger album, Far Off The Daybreak Call.

== Solo career ==
In 2014, Ballinger signed with Good Horse Records, an Austin-based production company. His 2014 album The State I'm In was recorded and produced by Good Horse Records in three days through a fully analog production system. The State I'm In was ranked "among Austin's best Americana releases of that year" by The Austin Chronicle. It received criticism, however, from The Austin Chronicle's music critic Jim Caligiuri. Ballinger did multiple tours behind The State I'm In, including through the West Coast and Midwest. Ballinger joined Nine Mile Touring in 2015 as well as the spring 2016 West Coast tour of East Cameron Folkcore.

His 2016 EP, Homestead, is being produced by Brian Beattie, Austin-based music producer. Beattie is known for producing Okkervil River's 2002 album, Don't Fall in Love with Everyone You See, as well as albums for Daniel Johnston, Shearwater and Bill Callahan. Ballinger has held Austin residencies at Hole in the Wall, Stay Gold and the White Horse. He is an official SXSW 2016 showcasing artist.

== Production ==
Ballinger partnered with Reid Connell to produce a music video for The Dalles, which led to the founding of the filmmaking company, Be Lie All. Connell and Ballinger also produced the music video for the single, "Ashes to Ashes", from Ballinger's The State I'm In.

== Discography ==
=== Albums and EPs ===
Year	Title	Artist	Label
2016	Homestead	Ben Ballinger	Unreleased
2014	The State I'm In	Ben Ballinger	Good Horse Records
2012	My Own Private White House	The Dalles	Self-released
2010	Fabrication	Ben Ballinger	Self-released
2008	Ben Ballinger	Ben Ballinger	Self-released
2005	A Minor Study	Jack Benjamin	Self-released
2003	Jack Benjamin	Jack Benjamin	Self-released
