= The Yuppie Pricks =

US musical group

- Origin: Austin, Texas, U.S.
- Genres: Punk; Comedy
- Years active: 1999–present
- Labels: Alternative Tentacles; Chicken Ranch
- Members: Trevor Middleton; Deuce Hollingsworth; Preston Hetherington III; Nigel Smythen-Wesson; Ricky Snifschitz
- Past members: Darin Murano; Ken Dannelly; Trey Robles
- Website: http://www.yuppiepricks.com

The Yuppie Pricks are an American five-piece punk rock band from Austin, Texas, United States. They "deal in reverse psychology punk by ironically celebrating the materialist excesses of the upwardly mobile in songs like "Greed Is Good", "Fraternity Days" and "Fuck You, I'm Rich", which are tinged with old school UK punk, Black Flag and Dead Kennedys touches."

Alternately described as "raucous, straight-ahead punk" and "American Psycho hardcore with a wicked sense of humor" the Yuppie Pricks are frequently lauded for their live performances, where they've been known to wear John McEnroe-era tennis gear and denounce the 'service industry scum' who come to their shows.

Director John Waters cited the Yuppie Pricks song "Coke Party" in a Variety magazine interview, as one of five songs that mean a lot to him.

== History ==
Formed in 1999 by self-styled pharmaceutical business magnate Trevor Middleton and third-generation divorce lawyer Deuce Hollingsworth, the Yuppie Pricks recorded their self-produced, self-released debut, Initial Public Offering.

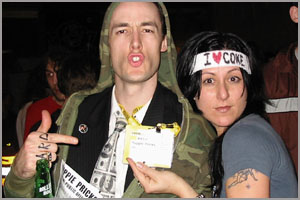
Trevor Middleton with YP fan.

Following numerous local gigs and an appearance at SXSW in 2003, drummer Darin Murano exited the band, due to a case of aggravated tendinitis. Murano was temporarily replaced by Ken Dannelley (ex-Stretford, Hamicks), but it was not until British expatriate Nigel Smythen-Wesson arrived that a permanent replacement was found.

Trevor Middleton on stage with champagne bucket.

A return performance at SXSW 2004 followed, during which the band was courted by former Dead Kennedys frontman Jello Biafra, and subsequently signed on with his Alternative Tentacles imprint, who released 2005's Brokers Banquet. Recorded at Bubble Studios by Chris 'Frenchie' Smith (ex-Sixteen Deluxe, Young Heart Attack), and mixed by Mark Hutchins, Brokers Banquet, which parodied the Rolling Stones' Beggars Banquet cover art, featured a more hard-edged 'rock' influence, combined with the tongue-in-cheek lyrics and punk-fueled aggression of the first album.

Along with the more aggressive sound came a transition from a four-piece to a five-piece line-up, with bassist Preston Hetherington switching over to second guitar, and the band recruiting Ricky the Intern from the 'Zero Skills Employment Agency' (according to their bio) on bass. With last-minute addition Trey Robles (ex-Hard Feelings) on drums, the band toured the East Coast in Spring of 2005, hitting renowned punk-rock enclave CBGB in New York City, as well as recording a live broadcast for XM Satellite Radio at the invitation of Lou Brutus of the station's Fungus 53 channel. Fungus 53 later named Broker's Banquet one of the top 25 punk albums of 2005, and John Peel kicked off his BBC broadcast during SXSW 2005 with the Yuppie Pricks song, "Cherry Red".

Following an extended hiatus, the Yuppie Pricks released their third full-length disc in 2008, Balls, on Chicken Ranch Records, an album where "the irony drips like bacon fat," "to negate everything you ever thought about punk," and which "recontextualizes classics from punk's ever-growing classic history (Buzzcocks, Big Boys! etc.) and creates new oil guzzling and FOX news approved republican punk anthems." Once again, the Yuppie Pricks dipped into their decidedly un-punk past to parody the Black Crowes' infamous Amorica album, featuring their own male-enhanced take on the 1970s-era Hustler-inspired cover art, and landing them in the October 2008 issue of Blender magazine.

Additionally, selected tracks from Balls, including "Donkey Show" and "Fuck You, I'm Rich", were put in heavy rotation on XM Satellite Radio's Fungus 53 punk channel.

Yuppie Pricks returned in 2014 with Appetite For Consumption, a more hard rock flavored album with covers of songs from the Sex Pistols and Sir Mix-A-Lot.

== Discography ==
=== Albums ===
- Initial Public Offering (YP Records, 2001)
- Brokers Banquet (Alternative Tentacles, 2005)
- Balls (Chicken Ranch, 2008)
- Appetite For Consumption (Chicken Ranch, 2014)

=== Singles ===
- "Stock Market" 7" (Chicken Ranch, 2005)
- "Let's Go Skiing/My Way" (Digital Single) (Chicken Ranch, 2010)

== See also ==
- Music of Austin
