= Liberty Lunch =

Former live music venue in Austin, TX

Coordinates: 30.26580°N 97.74904°W

Liberty Lunch was a live-music venue at 405 W. 2nd Street in Austin, Texas that operated until 1999. It was rumored to have been called Liberty Lunch in the 1940s as an eatery, perhaps reflecting the World War II Liberty Bonds and patriotic sentiment. Liberty Lunch has become notable in the history of Austin music, along with the Armadillo World Headquarters.

== History ==
It was a former lumberyard in the 1920s and 30s owned by Calcasieu Lumber Company (which sold to Carolina Holdings in 2000) and had been long abandoned. In the early years of Austin, the space was a wagon yard for the adjacent general store and livery stable. There were no signs that a restaurant had ever been in the tiny building that once served as the lumberyard front office.

In the early to mid '70s, a local comedy troupe started the famous and still operating Esther's Follies at this location performing weekend comedy shows and serving food and beer. The Liberty Lunch/ lumberyard property was then and continues to be owned and leased by the City of Austin. Over the next few years, Esther's Follies grew in popularity and the group began presenting live music on a tiny stage under the shadows of the former lumberyard shed and extended its schedule to 3–4 days a week.

In the late 1970s the group moved to 6th Street to provide year-round options for their productions. Liberty Lunch, as a former lumberyard was an unroofed space between a large city owned warehouse on the west and an historic building, The Schneider Store, on the eastern corner of the 400 block of West 2nd Street. As such, The Lunch as locals called it, was a spring and summer only operation whose weather permitting opening each spring was a highly anticipated and attended event. The comedy club owners sold the lease to Charlie Tesar who continued operations there as a seasonal live music venue.

In 1981, during the demolition of the Armadillo World Headquarters, the steel beams of the old armory were purchased at auction and brought over to the Liberty Lunch site and the first of several roof structures was built. Initially it was a see through greenhouse type roof that lasted briefly until it was replaced with a more substantial and all weather permitting solid structure. The roof had four giant shoebox removable type skylight lids that let the sky and stars in and the heat and smoke out. The dirt floor was replaced with concrete and a large wooden dance floor and improved stage was built.

In 1992, J'Net Ward and Mark Pratz, promoters of the club, took over the club's lease with the City of Austin and they made extensive renovations to the building. The club got another makeover with a solid front wall, stage rebuild, safety equipment and a side wall with roll-up garage doors opening onto an open-air 2,000 square foot side garden for fresh air, open seating and smoking.

In July 1999, the venue was forced to close to make way for a redevelopment project spearheaded by then-mayor Kirk Watson, which saw the construction of two office buildings for the Computer Sciences Corporation and the present-day Austin City Hall. Its last shows included sets by the Toadies, Bob Mould, Beto y Los Fairlanes and two nights of Sonic Youth.

== Recordings ==
- Sonic Youth - "Live at Liberty Lunch, Austin, TX, November 26, 1988
- Joe Ely – Live at Liberty Lunch (1990)
- Soul Asylum - "Live from Liberty Lunch, Austin, TX" Thursday 12/3/92
- Fugazi - "FLS0518 Austin, TX USA 4/12/1993"

== See also ==
- Music of Austin
