= Balcones Fault (band) =

1970s comedic Dixieland band

Balcones Fault was a 1970s comedic Dixieland jazz band from Austin, Texas who took their name after the Balcones Fault zone in southwest-central Texas. It frequently performed at the Armadillo World Headquarters. It appeared on the first season of Austin City Limits in 1976 and produced one album on the Cream label, It's All Balcones Fault, in 1977. The album's title was taken from a Dallas radio show script by Peter Nye, who played trombone with the band in 1975.

== See also ==
- Music of Austin
