= Black Heart Saints =

American rock band

- Origin: Austin, Texas, U.S.
- Genres: Hard rock
- Years active: 2014–present
- Labels: Cleopatra Records
- Members: Josh LeBlanc; Mark Sean; Ian C.G. Nathan Flores
- Website: blackheartsaintsmusic.com

Black Heart Saints is an American rock band from Austin, Texas, formed in 2014. In 2019, they won Austin Chronicle's "Best Metal Band" award, being recognized along with Willie Nelson, Jackie Venson, and Ghostland Observatory.

== History ==
On April 12, 2018, Mayor Steve Adler proclaimed April 12 to be "Black Heart Saints Day".

In 2020, the singles "Lines" and "Misery" topped out at #24 and #19, respectively, on Billboard Mainstream Rock Charts. The latest Billboard-charting single is "Reach the End", which peaked at #21 in October, 2021.

In 2021, the band was deemed an 'Artist You Need to Know' by Rolling Stone

On January 20, 2023, the single "Human Xstacy" was released on Cleopatra Records, along with an announcement that the band will tour with Steel Panther and The Winery Dogs.

== Members ==
- Josh LeBlanc – vocals
- Mark Sean – lead guitar
- Ian C.G. – bass
- Nathan Flores – drums

== Discography ==
=== Albums ===
- Alive (2017)

=== Extended Plays ===
- Misery (2020)

=== Singles ===
Year	Title	Peak chart positions	Albums
Year	Title	US Main. Rock	Albums
2020	"Lines"	24	Misery EP
2020	"Misery"	19	Misery EP
2021	"Reach the End"	21	
2023	"Human Xstacy"	—	
