= Tank Washington =

American rapper

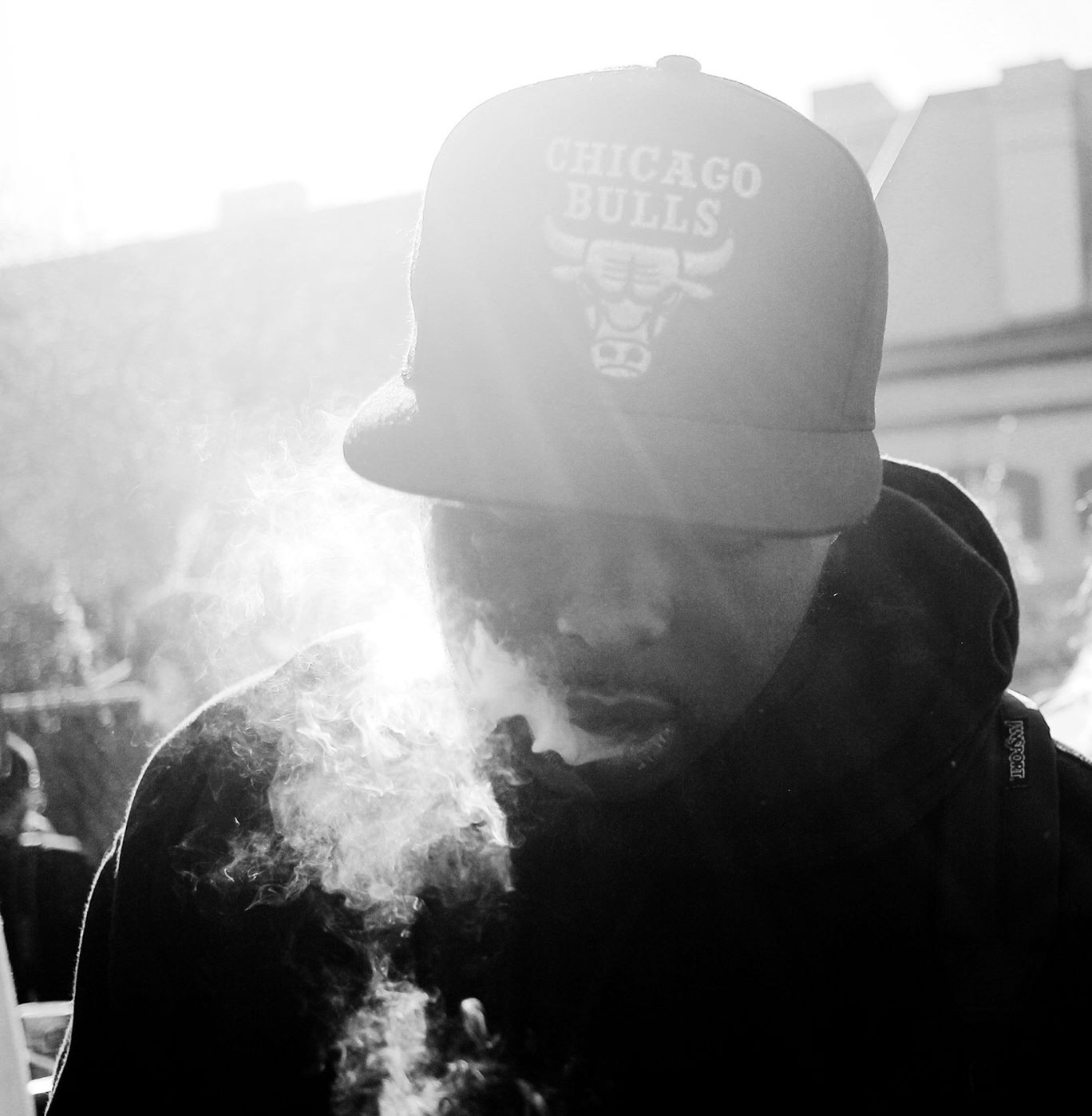

Background information
- Also known as: Pacboitank, Pacboi Tank
- Born: Princeton O. Washington
- Origin: Austin, Texas, U.S.
- Genres: Hip hop, southern hip hop
- Occupation: Rapper
- Years active: 2006–present
- Label: LNS Crew
- Website: lnscrew.com

Princeton O. Washington, known professionally as Tank Washington, is an American rapper and emcee from Austin, Texas, who has worked with artists like King Mez, Dee-1, ST 2 Lettaz, Stunnaman, GLC, Max Frost and Killa Kyleon.

== Career ==
Tank's first official release came as a member of the hiphop group Impac under the Austin independent music label Above All Entertainment with distribution from Tower Records' 33rd Street Records. In 2013, Washington released his first solo project, the 6 Shots EP, and performed as part of LNS Crew for Fun Fun Fun Fest. He was featured on the LNS Crew mixtape release during 2015; the year also marked his father's death from lung cancer. In 2016, Tank Washington released his album PAIN and had his debut solo set as an official SXSW Showcase Artist. In 2017, Tank performed with his brother Kydd Jones at Sound on Sound Fest. In 2018, Washington released his new album 183.
