= Music & Entertainment Television =

Music television channel

- Type: Cable television network
- Branding: Music & Entertainment Television; ME Television; ME TV
- Country: United States
- Availability: Spectrum channels 15 and 577, Austin only
- Owner: Austin Music Commission (owners); Austin Music Partners (operators)
- Launch date: April 1, 1994
- Former names: Austin Music Network (1994-2005)

Music & Entertainment Television (also known as ME Television and ME TV) is an Austin, Texas independent music television channel. Seen on Spectrum Government-access television (GATV) channel 15 and digital channel 577 in Austin, the channel is owned by the Austin Music Commission (a municipal agency), and operated by Austin Music Partners.

== History ==
ME TV had its roots with the Austin Music Network (AMN), a non-profit independent music television channel. The station began broadcasting April 1, 1994. Programming on the channel was reminiscent of early MTV programming and similar to a music radio format. It mostly took the form of music videos or prerecorded live sessions played continuously, often interspersed with presenters talking to a fixed camera for a short time. Presenters often produced their own shows (not unlike Public-access television) and encouraged viewers to email requests to them at an address displayed on-screen. AMN also broadcast reruns of Austin City Limits recordings and documentaries about various characters of the Central Texas music scene. Although all musical tastes were catered for, an emphasis was placed on broadcasting non-mainstream music. Particular emphasis was placed on indie, punk, blues, country and jazz.

Originally broadcast without commercials, advertising was added in 1998 after the Austin City Council awarded a contract to the Music Management Co. to revamp and run the network. Under Music Management, AMN failed to garner more viewers or advertisers; the quality of the channel was also lowered.

In 2004, the contract was awarded to another for-profit company, Austin Music Partners, who relaunched the channel in October 2005 as Music & Entertainment Television. The quality and programming of the channel improved slightly featuring new sets, new shows and crew and a polished new office on South Congress Ave. Despite trying the new management could not attract advertisers or viewers and again dipped in channel quality.

On August 22, 2008, ME TV laid off most of its employees, leaving a skeleton crew to keep the station running while trying to find new sources to help finance the channel. Despite the financial dire straits, ME TV still has plans to expand to San Antonio, pending investment availability.

== See also ==
- Music of Austin
