= Carnaval Brasileiro (Austin, Texas) =

Annual festival in Austin, Texas, US

Carnaval Brasileiro is an annual one-night festival in Austin, Texas. It is a large indoor Carnival influenced by the traditions of Brazil.

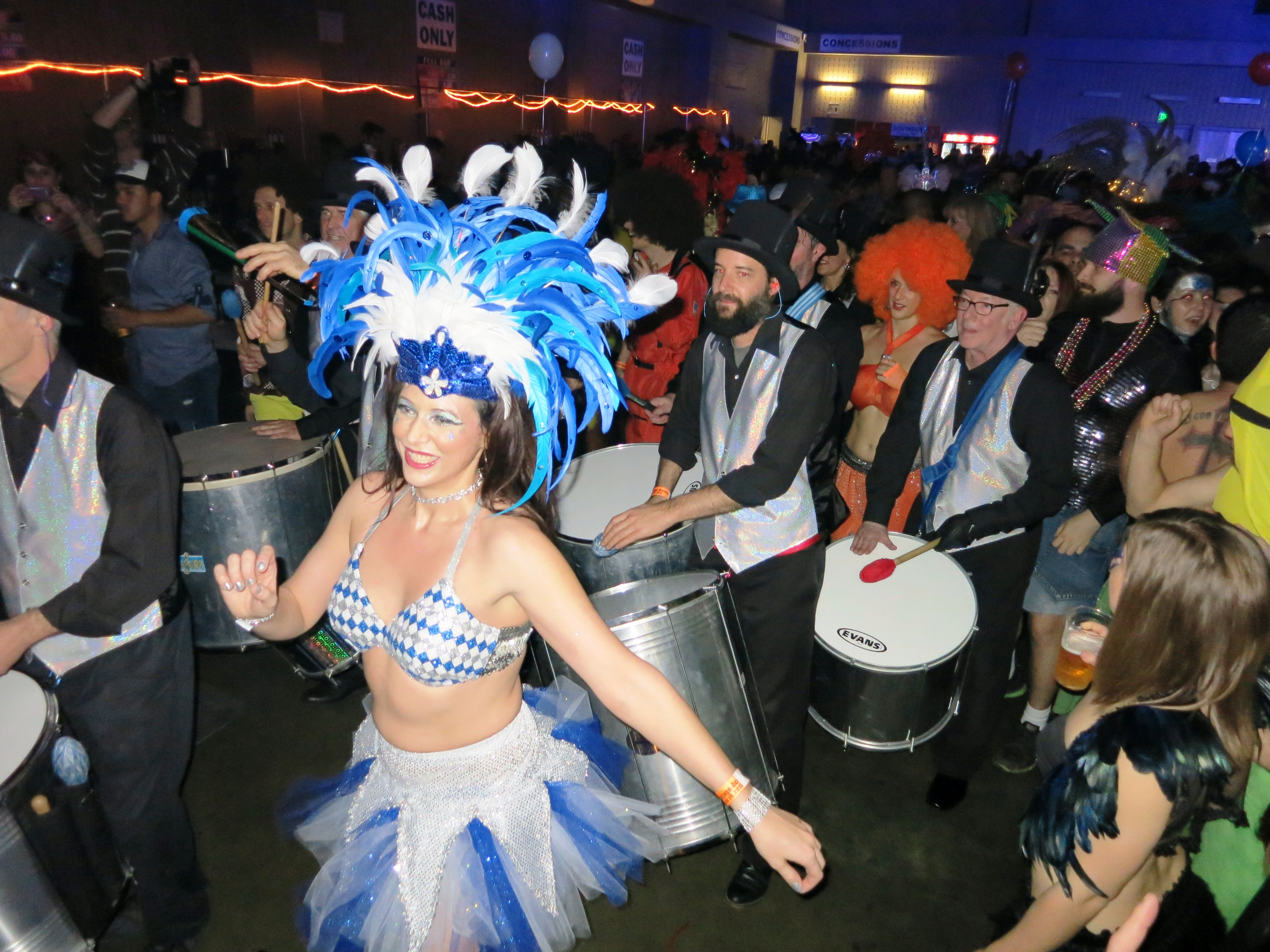
At the 2015 Carnaval Brasileiro Austin

== Origin ==
Carnaval in Brazil derives from the medieval Christian revels in Europe held just prior to the forty days of Lent. This annual festival of flesh was further enriched in Brazil by African rhythms, especially the samba. Carnaval is an all-consuming nationwide festival in Brazil, celebrated differently in each part of the country by all social classes over a period of four days: Saturday, Sunday, Monday and Tuesday before Ash Wednesday.

== History ==
The Austin celebration began around 1975. At that time there were many Brazilian scholarship students at UT taking a six-week-long intensive English course. Faced with the prospect of a February without Carnaval, they decided with their local friends to hold their own celebration. Carnaval '75 took place in a small room at Austin's Unitarian Church. The two hundred or so revelers had planted a seed.

For the next several years the party moved further downtown, drawing ever larger crowds. Carnaval '76, held at the Bucket (a bar) on West 23rd Street, drew over three hundred, who struggled to keep their footing in the spilled beer. A highlight of that evening was the thunderous collapse of a low stage under the weight of fifty wildly drumming Brazilians. They just looked at one another for a second, saw no one was hurt, and partied on! A group of devoted "Brasilianistas" continued to organize a Carnaval that began growing rapidly beyond their control.

The last party to retain the original University focus was held at Dobie Center in 1977, with over five hundred participants. The size of the crowd and problems with the home-style sound system pointed up the need for a large hall with professional sound equipment. As the number of scholarships dwindled, the Brazilian students were gradually submerged into a Carnaval that Austinites were making their own.

At this point Mike Quinn entered the picture. Quinn, the producer of Horizontes, a daily radio program dedicated to the music of Latin America on KUT-FM (Austin's NPR affiliate), was in 1978 a salesman at Discount Records. Quinn undertook the organization of Carnaval '78 as an outlet for his own creative interests in Brazilian music.

The celebration, held at the double-tiered Boondocks Club (later Club Foot, and even later a parking lot) on East 4th Street in downtown Austin, was the take-off for Carnaval Brasileiro as it exists today. Carnaval '78 packed in over a thousand bodies, sweating and gyrating to the drumming of Austin's first Carnaval group: an ad hoc assembly of local musicians including ethnomusicologists from UT and members of Beto y Los Fairlanes, all under the direction of Dr. Gerard Behague of the UT Department of Music. Though the drumming was improvised, the atmosphere was magic and it set the stage for the live music featured at every Carnaval since. That party continued until 4:00am, and the club had to repaint the dance floor the following week!

Accordingly, in 1979 Carnaval moved into the legendary Armadillo World Headquarters (now defunct), where Austin's first Brazilian band, Os Imperialistas do Samba (later Unidos de Austin), played to a capacity house of 1800. The night's three-dollar tickets were scalped outside for as much as twenty-five dollars.

In 1980 Carnaval Brasileiro finally moved to the warehouse-like Coliseum, which, despite two sojourns at Austin's 7,000 capacity Palmer Auditorium (1981 and 1984), has become its home. The 1980 Carnaval also inaugurated the classic series of Austin artist Guy Juke's poster and T-shirt designs. The event continued to grow in size and sophistication throughout the 1980s.

Meanwhile, organizers have searched for the right formula to make the party sizzle. The earlier costume contests were dropped because they interrupted the flow of the music and dancing.

It has continued to be held at various venues around the city. There was no Carnaval in 2021.

== Music ==
Carnaval Brasileiro features Austin Samba, the largest samba group in the United States.

The Music of Carnaval—samba, march, frevo, trio electrico, and much batucada, or drumming—now pours out in seamless, driving, ninety-minute sets. This is the euphoria of a real Carnaval, magnified by an arena-style sound system that makes three or four drums sound like a hundred. The key to the samba sound is the heavy boom of the surdo bass drums set against the counter-rhythms and back beats for the smaller percussion.

== Reference and external links ==
- Samba Party - Official Carnaval Brasileiro Austin Texas website
- Austin Samba
- Carnaval Brasileiro 2012 in Austin by Patricia Ribeiro, About.com Guide archived March 2013
