= Soul Track Mind =

American band

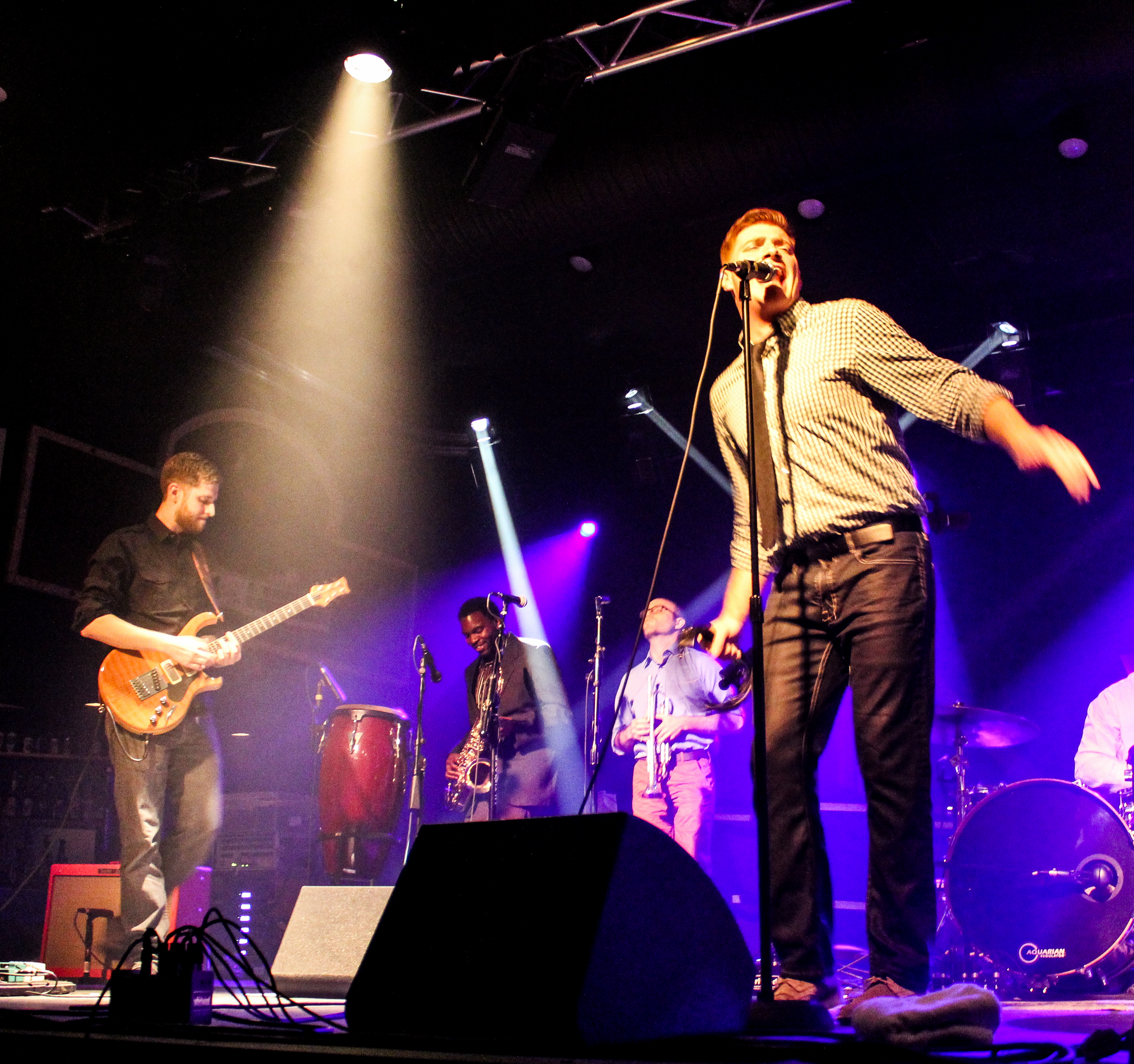

Background information
- Origin: Austin, Texas, USA
- Years active: 2008–2017
- Members: Donovan Keith, Jonathon Zemek, Andrew Nolte, James Tommey, Michael Ingber, Michael Culbertson
- Website: soultrackmind.com

Soul Track Mind is an American band from Austin, Texas with a sound that blends soul, r&b, rock, funk, blues, and jazz. The band has been cited, along with acts such as Sharon Jones & The Dap-Kings and Mayer Hawthorne, as influential in the contemporary reemergence and retooling of the soul music genre.

Soul Track Mind was founded in 2008 by Donovan Keith and Jonathon Zemek. Zemek and Keith are the only remaining members of the band's initial lineup. The group currently consists of Keith (vocalist and frontman), Zemek (guitar), Andrew Nolte (keys), Jimmy Hartman (bass), Michael Ingber (drums), Shane Walden (trumpet), and Michael Culbertson (saxophone).

Soon after its formation, the band began to draw attention in Austin with a residency at TC's Lounge, a now-closed juke joint in East Austin, where they played regularly on Wednesday nights, logging 82 shows from 2008 to 2010.

Since its inception, the band has released three full-length albums and two singles and has toured throughout most of the United States. STM was featured on the cover of the 2013 summer issue of Texas Music magazine and won the 2014 Louisiana Music Prize, which led to collaboration with producer Lawrence "Boo" Mitchell of Royal Studios. STM is set to release a six-song EP in last 2016.

== Discography ==
=== Albums ===
- Ghost of Soul (August 17, 2010)
- Soul Track Mind (April 30, 2013)
- Unbreakable (September 16, 2014)
- Generations (December 16, 2016)

=== Singles ===
- "Rebound Man" (November 15, 2011)
- "Look at Her Mama" (February 7, 2012)
