= Lakrea Clark =

American R&B and jazz singer-songwriter (born 1991)

- Also known as: Lakrea
- Born: Lakrea Merie Clark; October 19, 1991 (age 34); Austin, Texas, U.S.
- Genres: R&B
- Occupation: Singer-songwriter
- Years active: 2004–present
- Website: lakrea.com

Lakrea Merie Clark (born October 19, 1991), also known by his stage name Lakrea, is an American R&B and jazz singer-songwriter.

== Early life ==
Lakrea Merie Clark was born on October 19, 1991 in Austin, Texas.

Lakrea Clark began performing at the age of three in her family's church and wrote her first song at the age of eight.

== Career ==
Lakrea began singing professionally at the age of thirteen. She has performed at various venues across Texas, as well as at the MGM Grand and Showtime at the Apollo. Currently, Lakrea is being managed by her father, Darren. On February 20, 2006, she released her debut album, Southern Girl independently. Currently, she is in the works of being signed to No Limit Records. However, it has not been finalized.

== Discography ==
=== Albums ===
Year	Album
2006	Southern Girl

=== Singles ===
- "We Can Do It" (Featuring Jamale)
- "So Tired"
