= Austin Civic Orchestra =

The Austin Civic Orchestra is a nonprofit volunteer-based amateur orchestra with ~80 musicians based in Austin, Texas. It was founded in 1977. ACO's mission is to educate and entertain the public with high quality classical music. The orchestra's members are from all walks of life and ages range from 18 to 75. The ACO generally performs 6-7 concerts per season, including pops concerts and holiday concerts. The orchestra also sponsors the annual Pearl Amster Youth Chamber Music Festival and collaborates with the University of Texas on their annual Texas Rising Stars contest.

Dr. Lois Ferrari has been the ACO Music Director and conductor for 16 seasons and is also Professor of Music at Southwestern University in Georgetown.

In recent years, the ACO has won 2nd place for community orchestra performance in the nationally adjudicated American Prize. Dr. Ferrari was also awarded 2nd place for community orchestra conducting from the same organization.
