= Mothfight =

American experimental pop band

Moth Fight
- Mothfight Promotional Image, October 2009

Background information
- Origin: Austin, Texas/Brooklyn, New York, U.S.
- Genres: Glo-fi, shitgaze, indie pop, neo-psychedelia, experimental
- Years active: 2007–present
- Members: Kevin Attics; Jessica Boettger; Clarke Dominick; Mike Yaklin

Moth Fight is an American experimental pop outfit based in Austin, Texas. Their sound is a blend of orchestral instrumentation (trumpets, cellos, violins, banjos, barbershop harmony), tape loops, samples, synthesizers, and circuit bent toys.

== Discography ==
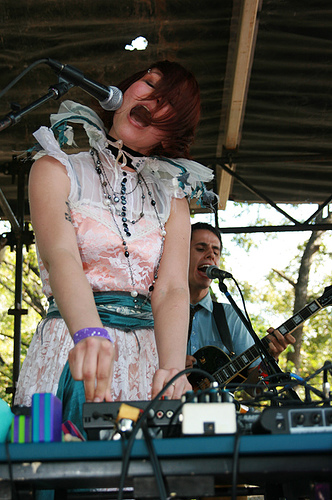
Kevin Attics and Jessica Boettger mid-performance at Fun Fun Fun Fest in Austin, TX

=== US singles ===
- Hopscotch (2007) Natrix Natrix Records

=== Compilations ===
- "Rev. Sharp's Invention (Live)" featured on Technicolor Yawn: KVRX Local Live Vol. 12 (2008) KVRX
- "A Long Way from Home" featured on HABITAT (2008) Asthmatic Kitty

== Trivia ==
- The song "Hopscotch" is apparently inspired by Julio Cortázar's novel Hopscotch and includes lyrics written in Gliglish, the constructed language La Maga teaches Horacio.
- "Hopscotch, pt. 2" references both Lewis Carroll's Jabberwocky and the Grimm Brothers' White and Black Bride

== See also ==
- Music of Austin
