= Beto y Los Fairlanes =

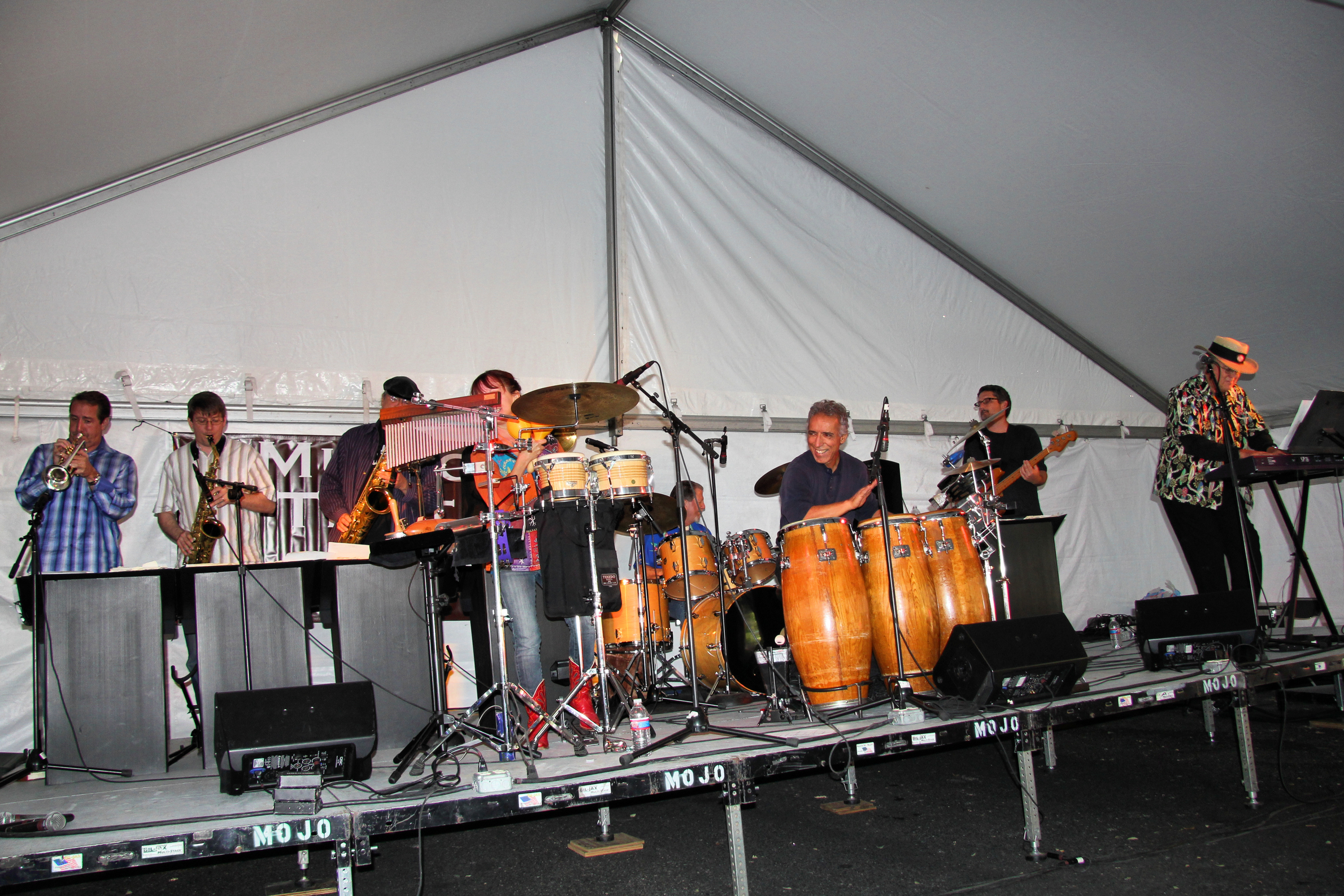
Beto y Los Fairlanes performing at the 2012 Texas Book Festival

Beto y Los Fairlanes, now more commonly known as Beto and the Fairlanes, is a worldbeat, latin pop, jazz and salsa band from Austin, Texas, founded in the late 1970s by Robert "Beto" Skiles. The band came out of the prolific 1970s Austin music scene. Early in their career, the band played at Austin venues such as the Armadillo World Headquarters, Liberty Lunch, and Soap Creek Saloon. The band released their first album, Midnight Lunch in 1978.

The band is the brainchild of Robert Skiles, a native of San Antonio who has degrees in music from the University of Texas at Austin and University of North Texas. Before forming Beto and the Fairlanes, Skiles was, and still is, a prominent jazz pianist in Austin. On the classical side, he played piano for the Austin City Ballet and the University of Texas dance department. He has also written and conducted four major works for orchestra. In 1980 the group performed on the PBS music television program Austin City Limits.

Why Beto and the Fairlanes? In his own words on his website, Skiles explains, “Beto was a result of my bilingual roots in San Antonio, a love of jazz and classical music that came from my parents who were both accomplished artists, and a desire to write and perform highly energetic, improvised music that was both challenging to play and fun to dance to! My vision was to combine, in a unique way, what I love about jazz and Latin music"... "The name 'Beto and the Fairlanes?' was something I just thought up as a fun name for a typical South Texas street band. In time, the name and the music stuck and here we are! What are we doing now? Well, after so many years of playing concerts and recording, we still get together for the same reason we did when we started: simply to have fun! Sure, we still have other projects in the works, but nowadays we have about one gig a month and it’s a family party: band and fans. And it’s fun. That’s what we’re all about!"

Drummer John "Mambo" Treanor, who died of cancer on August 20, 2001 at age 48 was an original member. Treanor also founded the group 47 Times Its Own Weight and was known for his hats and ties made from the fur of roadkill animals.

The band's sixth album, Conga Dog was released January 6, 2006. Later that same year, the band played a show at the Austin City Limits Music Festival.

In the fall of 2012 (end of August to the beginning of October), Beto and the Fairlanes embarked on a 35-day tour in and around Austin Texas as a celebration of their 35th anniversary (playing something somewhere every day, inclusive of shows at Guero's Taco Bar, Ruta Maya, South Austin Museum of Popular Culture, La Cabana, Antone's, Continental Club, Reunion Grille, Rattle Inn, Elephant Room, Iguana Grill, and Threadgill's) - This tour was called the 35 DAZE tour.

During the 35 DAZE tour, The Cowboy (Mr. Allison Barton Rice) recorded fifteen of the shows and a sampler of those recordings entitled 35 DAZE - Beto and the Fairlanes in the Live Music Capital of the World - Austin Texas was released at Beto and the Fairlanes 36th anniversary show on September 15, 2013 at One World Theatre in Austin, TX.

== Discography ==
- Sesos De Huesos/Butt Dance US 7 Inch Single Fable Records - FS 102 (1977)
- Midnight Lunch (1978)
- Beto Vivo (1980)
- Mongoose Island (1983)
- Eye of the Hurricane (1989)
- Salsafied (1994) (Released on Regalo Records)
- Conga Dog (2006) (Released on Regalo Records)
- Best O Beto (2012)
- 35 Daze (2013)
- ¡Merry TeXmas! (2014)

== See also ==
- Music of Austin
