= Wiretree =

US musical group

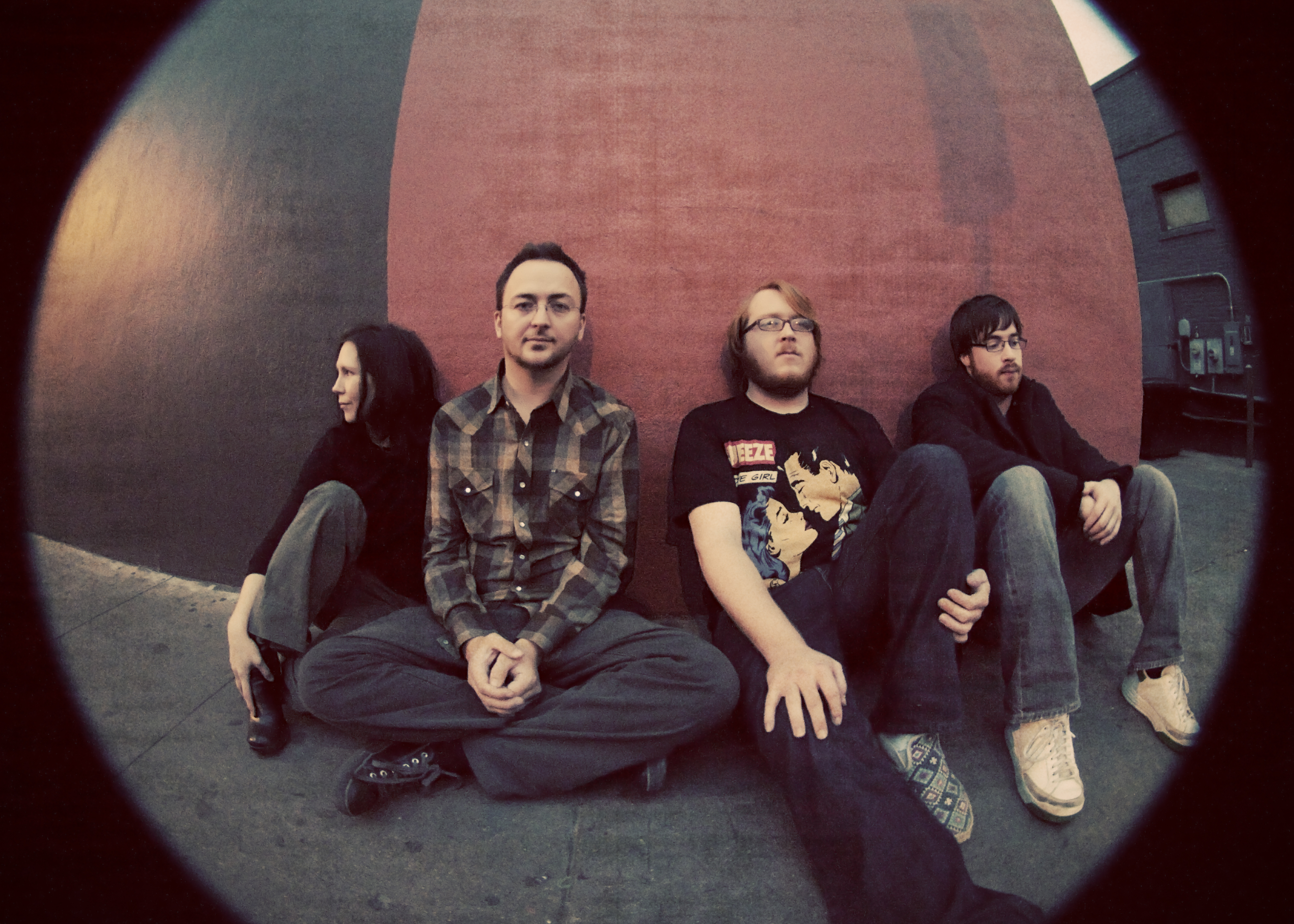
- Wiretree from left to right R.Peroni, K.Peroni, Blanchard, Kaplan

Background information
- Origin: Austin, Texas, United States
- Genres: indie rock, post-punk, singer-songwriter
- Years active: 2005–present
- Label: Cobaltworks Records (US)
- Members: Kevin Peroni; Joshua Kaplan; Rachel Peroni; Daniel Jones; Gregory White
- Past members: Carlos Villarreal; Benjamin Portnoy; Daniel Blanchard
- Website: wiretreemusic.com

Wiretree is an indie pop/indie rock project hailing from Austin, Texas. Founded by Kevin Peroni, Wiretree's music is built on a foundation of intimate, homemade recordings. While primarily a solo endeavor, the project has featured collaborations with other musicians, including Joshua Kaplan and Gregory White on guitar, Rachel Peroni on bass, Daniel Blanchard on drums and Daniel Jones, also on drums.

Peroni's music draws from a diverse range of influences, including British rock, indie, singer-songwriter traditions, and jazz, all filtered through a DIY aesthetic. This eclectic blend has earned Wiretree spots at notable festivals such as Loop Festival in Spain (2011) and China's Strawberry Festival (2013).

== History ==
Initially working under the pseudonym Wiretree, Kevin Peroni self-produced and performed the full-length album, Bouldin in 2007. The album's track, Big Coat was featured on the PBS series Roadtrip Nation. After the release of Bouldin, Peroni recruited others from Craigslist to play out live. The group released their second effort Luck in 2009 while being named Best kept secret by Blurt Magazine. The Canadian Television series Heartland featured Wiretree's song Whirl In early 2011. On January 26, 2011, the band was recorded on Austin City Limits Satellite Sets for KLRU. In 2013, Wiretree was featured in the season 2 finale of the PBS show, Hardly Sound. The Duplass Brothers produced movie Adult Beginners, featured two songs (Get up and The Shore) from the band in 2015. In 2016 the band's song Get Up was featured in a National Ad Council advertisement narrated by Matthew McConaughey asking the public to donate to Louisiana flood victims. The new full-length album,"Back on Track" was released on September 1st, 2025.

== Artists featured on various songs ==
- Kevin Peroni – vocals, guitar, piano, drums
- Joshua Kaplan – guitar
- Rachel Peroni – bass
- Daniel Jones – drums, percussion
- Daniel Blanchard – drums, percussion
- Gregory White – guitar

== Discography ==
=== Studio albums ===
- Bouldin LP (US, 2007) Cobaltworks Music
- Luck LP (US, 2009) Cobaltworks Music
- Make Up LP (US, 2011) Cobaltworks Music
- Get Up LP (US, 2013) Cobaltworks Music
- Towards the Sky LP (US, 2017) Cobaltworks Music
- Back on Track LP (US, 2025) Cobaltworks Music

=== EPs ===
- Self Titled EP (2005) Self-released
- Careless Creatures EP (2020) Self-released

=== Singles ===
- You've got Tonight (US, 2017) Cobaltworks Music
- Rainy Corner (US, 2018) Cobaltworks Music
- Inside (US, 2022) Cobaltworks Music

== Used in Film/TV ==
- The Song The Shore was used in the final episode, Season 4 episode 13 for The CW show, Walker on June 26, 2024
- The Song Another Time was used in the Season 4 episode 9 for The CW show, Walker on May 29, 2024
- The Song When You Were Young was used in the Season 4 episode 6 for The CW show, Walker on May 8, 2024
- The Song Big Coat was used in the Season 2 episode 7 for CBS show, Walker on January 16, 2021
- The Song Nightlight was used in the Season 1 episode 17 for CBS show, Walker on July 22, 2021
- The Song Broken Foot was used in the Season 1 episode 7 for CBS show, Walker on March 17, 2021
- The Song Get Up was used in the UK trailer for feature film, Juliet Naked on July 9, 2018
- The Song The Shore was used in season 2 episode 4 of People of Earth on TBS August 14, 2017
- The Song Get Up was used in a national advertisement campaign (Ad Council) for Louisiana flood victims in September 2016.
- The songs Get Up and When You Were Young used in the Fox TV show Grandfathered in 2016
- The songs The Shore and Get Up were used in the film Adult Beginners in 2015
- The song Big Coat was used in the final episode of the ABC show Selfie in early 2015
- The song Out of my mind was used in the CBS series Person of Interest in the Spring of 2014
- The song When You Were Young was used in the CTV series Played late 2013
- The song Big Coat was used in episode 4 of Roadtrip Nation in 2008, broadcast on PBS.
- The song Get Up was used in season 4 episode 9 of The Listener on June 17, 2013, broadcast on CTV
- The song Whirl was used in season 4 episode 11 of Heartland in early 2011, broadcast on CTV
- The song Back in Town was used in the film Hold Your Peace in 2011
