= Jackie Venson =

American singer, songwriter and musician

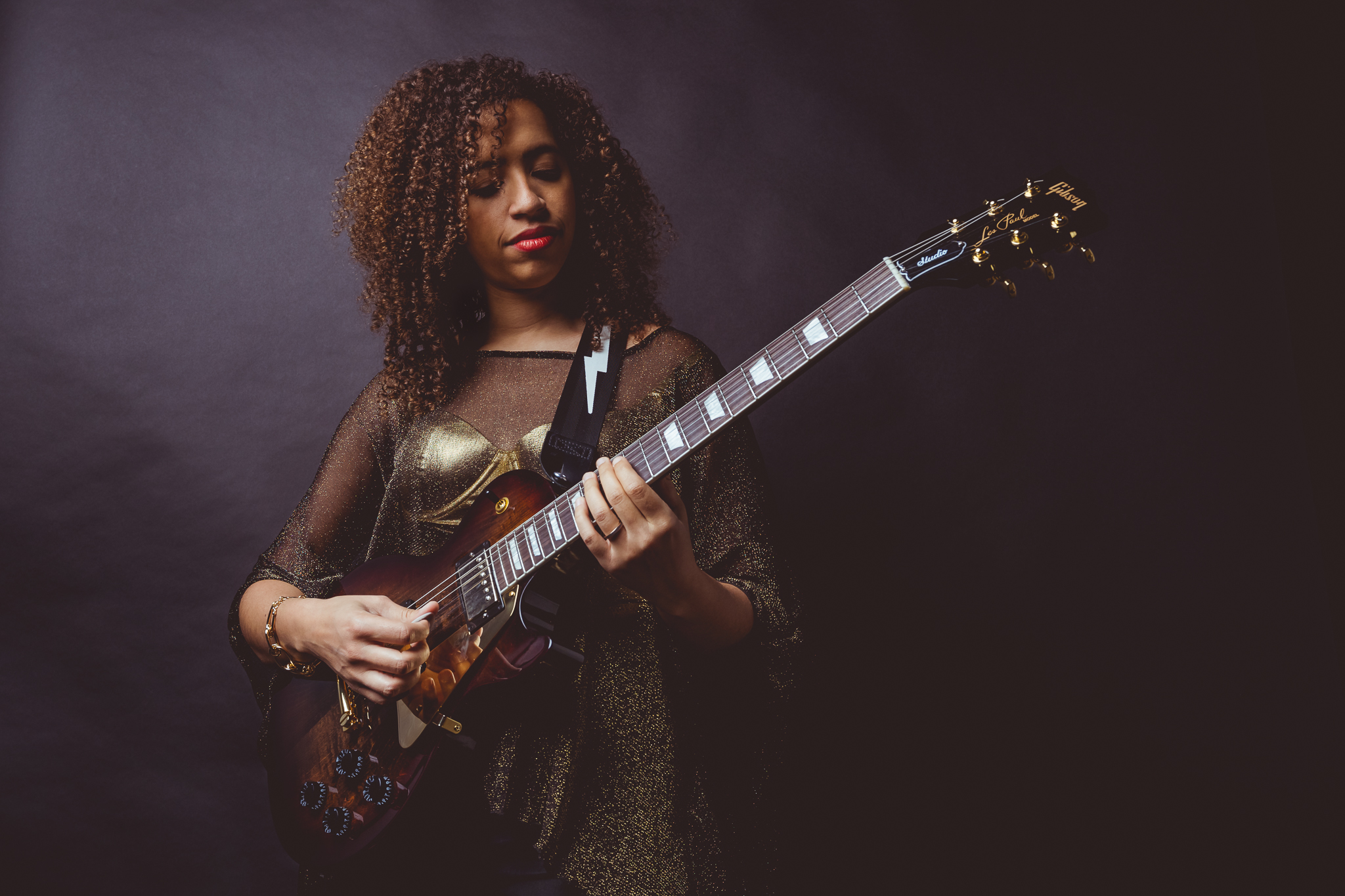

Background information
- Born: 5 February 1990 (age 36); Austin, Texas, United States
- Genres: Blues rock, soul, pop rock
- Occupations: Singer, songwriter, guitarist
- Instruments: Vocals; guitar; piano
- Years active: 2013-present
- Website: jackievenson.com

Jackie Venson (born 5 February 1990) is an American singer-songwriter and guitarist from Austin, Texas. She graduated from Berklee College of Music in 2011. She has released five studio albums, Joy (2019), Love Transcends (2021), Evolution of Joy (2023), Ghost in the Machine (2023) and The Love Anthology (2025). In addition to her studio albums, Venson has released six live albums, Live at Strange Brew (2016) Live in Texas (2020), Jackie Venson Live at Austin City Limits, Joy Alive (2021), Love Transcends: Live in Austin (2022) and Ghost Live (2024). Venson also has an electronic musical DJ alter ego that goes by the name "jackie the robot", through which she releases projects regularly.

== Early life ==
Venson was born in Austin, Texas. She grew up the youngest of nine siblings. Her father, Andrew Venson, worked for 40 years as a prominent professional musician before retiring. Venson's mother, Dr. Diane Brinkman, encouraged her to begin playing piano at age eight. Venson was not very disciplined in practice, noting: "It took me three years to put the focus in enough to where I could put my hands together on the piano, and it took me an additional two and a half to three years after that to even want to practice for more than 45 minutes at a time, which you have to if you want to learn how to do anything." It took her about three more years to be able to focus on playing for "three or four hours straight like a working musician". She considers her musician father a major influence:

Well my dad is a professional musician and he was my example. A lot of people like music and they think they have an affinity for it but if nobody else in the family does, then they sometimes don't see it as a possibility. Having my dad as a professional musician, it's like ... you can do this, it's hard but you can do this.

Venson attended Westwood High School (Austin, Texas) and the Berklee College of Music, where she majored in composition and studio production. She said she had a bad experience at Berklee with the ultra-competitive environment the staff fostered, describing it as "American Idol the school". "Berklee was really hard for me", Venson recalled. "I was expecting it to be one thing and it ended up being another thing and I was really depressed probably for the entire time I went there. I didn't really play at all." At a social gathering, she was inspired by the ease with which a schoolmate performed the guitar, noting that the student "looked like he was having so much fun, and I was like, 'Dude, I don't have that much fun doing anything related to music'". She decided to pursue guitar, and began learning the instrument in 2011, during her last year at Berklee. Her piano studies and the music theory she learned in school helped her adapt to the new instrument.

== Career ==
In April 2014, Venson entered the Modern Southern Music Competition and won a headlining spot on the Belk Summer Tour. She opened for country artists Jason Aldean, Tim McGraw and James Taylor. She has also performed at the Austin Urban Music Festival.

Austin City Hall declared May 21, 2014 Jackie Venson Day, and held a concert in her honor to raise money for an Austin music school.

Venson released her debut studio album, The Light In Me, in 2014. In 2016, she released the EP Jackie Venson Live, and the live album Live at Strange Brew. On September 30, 2017, Venson released her EP Transcends. On October 30, 2018, she released the song "Cover My Eyes" with a live in studio video. In April 2019, she released her critically acclaimed album Joy and celebrated that release with a sold-out show at Austin's famed Paramount Theatre. Though 2020 was filled with turmoil caused by the COVID-19 pandemic, she doubled down on her creative efforts after her touring year was cancelled by dedicating herself to going live on a consistent basis on several platforms and releasing five albums of music: two live albums (Live in Texas, Jackie Venson Live at Austin City Limits), two volumes of her DJ remix project "jackie the robot", and one studio album (Vintage Machine). This output of music and livestreaming saw Venson's star rise significantly and caught the attention of the historic television series Austin City Limits. On November 14, 2020, she made her national television debut as a part of Austin City Limits' 46th season. Her prolific livestreaming also landed her at number 10 on Pollstar's Top Music Live Streamers of 2020, putting her among established outlets like the Grand Ole Opry and accomplished artists like Norah Jones and Questlove. In the summer of 2021, Venson joined Melissa Etheridge for her musical cruise in the Caribbean, performing alongside musicians including Celisse Henderson and Britney Spencer.

In April 2023, Venson performed at the CMTA Awards in Austin, Texas, joining, on guitar, Alanis Morissette for her performance and later Lainey Wilson.

In January 2023, Venson debuted her annual residency at the world-famous Antone's Night Club in Austin, selling out every Saturday that month.

== Musical style and influences ==
Venson performs and records with a three-piece band of professional musicians, although often switches up her live instrumentation to be anywhere from solo, to a six-piece band. In her live performances, she uses a Pioneer DJ sampler to create a layered sound.

The Austin American-Statesman described Venson as "a Gary Clark Jr.-level talent who speaks boldly through her guitar while entrancing with her gorgeous, smoky voice." Guitar World noted the influence of blues and soul music on her vocals. Parade called her a soul/pop guitarist and vocalist. The Austin Chronicle wrote that her "willingness to stand naked lyrically and vocally" is an "admirable" trait, while her "smoldering and honest" voice "won't blow doors off buildings, but if she could, it would be overkill." The Chicago Sun-Times said Venson brings "formidable instrumental chops and a musical message of positivity", with a "singing voice that radiates warmth and spirit".

Venson's influences include Buddy Guy, Sade, and Alicia Keys. Her voice has been compared to Joss Stone and Amy Winehouse.

== Accolades ==
Year	Organization	Accolade	Artist/work	Ranked	Source
2019	Pop Magazine	Best Albums of 2019	Joy	7	
2021	Pop Magazine	Best Albums of 2021	Love Transcends	12	

== Discography ==
Studio albums

- Joy (2019)
- Love Transcends (2021)
- evolution of joy (2023)
- Ghost in the Machine (2023)
- The Love Anthology (2025)

Live albums

- Live at Strange Brew (2016)
- Live in Texas (2020)
- Jackie Venson Live at Austin City Limits (2020)
- Joy Alive (2021)
- Love Transcends Live in Austin (2022)
- Ghost Live (2024)
