= Max Frost =

American indie rock musician (born 1992)

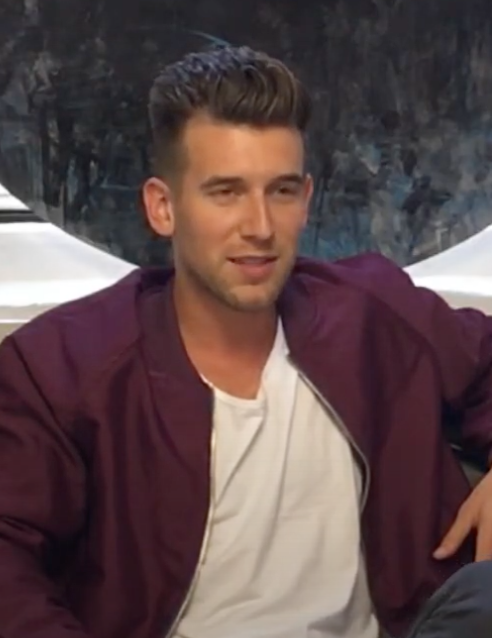
- Frost in 2018

Background information
- Born: Matthew Alexander Frost; July 5, 1992 (age 34); Austin, Texas, U.S.
- Genres: Alternative hip hop, pop rock, indie pop
- Years active: 2010–present
- Labels: Atlantic; Nettwerk
- Website: maxfrost.net

Matthew Alexander "Max" Frost (born July 5, 1992) is an American singer, songwriter, producer and multi-instrumentalist from Austin, Texas, who is signed to Atlantic Records. He has released two EPs: Low High Low in October 2013, and Intoxication in September 2015, followed by the release of his debut album, Gold Rush, in 2018.

== Early life ==
Max Frost was born and raised in Austin, Texas. He began playing drums at four, and began learning to play guitar at Dave Seebree's Rock Camp USA when he was eight years old. In high school, he attended St. Andrew's Episcopal School.

== Career ==
Frost developed his eclectic style of music by playing in various projects throughout his teen years. He started playing shows at 12 with Austin artists like bluegrass and gypsy jazz fiddler Ruby Jane and Bob Schneider. After hearing musicians like Erykah Badu and D'Angelo in his late teens, Frost began incorporating hip-hop elements into his blues-inspired stylings, interested in the idea of combining modern rhythms with classic vintage tones in his music. He played with several bands, including Joy Ride (a rock group) and Blues Mafia. However, in the winter of 2010, he was introduced to hip-hop MC Kydd. The rapper enlisted Frost to make hooks for his songs, an invitation that Frost was hesitant to accept at first. He explained, "I liked hip-hop but didn't think anybody wanted me to be a part of that," though he admitted that, ultimately, Kydd "was the catalyst of me moving into the worlds of R&B and hip-hop."

In the fall of 2011, Frost enrolled at The University of Texas at Austin, where he studied English, but didn't like it, calling the major "ridiculous." Living on campus, he would spend a lot of time writing and recording music on his computer. The following summer, he went to Los Angeles, where he stayed with a friend of his who made music videos. In September 2012 — just one day into his sophomore year — Frost decided to leave school to pursue his solo career.

In an interview with The Daily Texan magazine, he recounted that right before a performance at the 2013 South by Southwest festival, someone stole his guitar and backpack (containing his laptop and a hard drive). The hard drive contained all the music he'd worked on for two years. The incident left him in a "slump", and made him have doubts about his decision to drop-out of college. Three days later, the blog Pigeons & Planes starting streaming his song “White Lies", a tune he'd written during the summer of 2012 and posted to his SoundCloud account in March 2013. Frost was surprised to wake up one morning with over 1,000 download notifications from SoundCloud. The song ultimately hit number one on Hype Machine's “Most Popular Tracks on Blogs Now", which resulted in Frost being sought out by Atlantic Records. He signed a deal with the label in June 2013. Re-working several older songs from memory, he released his debut EP, Low High Low that October. Frost stated that “the songs all connect to polar emotional states in life—highs and lows—giving the EP its name.” He toured in 2013 and 2014 to promote the album, going on the road to open for acts such as Fitz and the Tantrums and Gary Clark Jr. In December 2013, "White Lies" was featured in a commercial for Beats Electronics. It has since peaked at number 29 on the Billboard Adult Alternative Songs chart.

Frost's second EP, Intoxication, was released on September 15, 2015. He chose to release a second EP because he feels they work better in the Internet market, as albums work better for "big" artists. Frost said the title comes from the fact that "the songs personify non-chemical things as a drug (love, money, death)." It marked the first time he had made his music while working with other producers, including Benny Blanco, Nick Ruth, and Franc Tétaz.

On February 23, 2018, Frost released his single "Good Morning" along with a music video. "Good Morning" appeared in the debut advertising campaign for PepsiCo's Bubly Sparkling Water, as well as commercials for the ESPN morning show Get Up!. In 2018, it was used for the rebrand of the TV channel Network 10 and for Google in Australia.

Frost joined The Bandito Tour with musical duo Twenty One Pilots as the opening act alongside electronic rock band AWOLNATION. Frost's debut album, Gold Rush was released on October 5, 2018.

== Influences ==
What influences my music is the musical desegregation of all styles [in Austin]. It has a blank music identity that is like, 'We are the live music capital.' It isn’t [just] blues music or rap music — there’s no specific flag that it waves for a genre. I feel like that blend is pretty important for me [in regard to] not having as much respect for what a genre is — in a good way.

— Max Frost, Emory Wheel

Frost credits his influences as the Beatles ("because of the craze they started"), Frank Sinatra, and hip-hop music in general.

== Reception ==
Rolling Stone called Frost's music "heart-felt soul crooning atop songs that lie somewhere between blues, R&B, hip-hop and electronic pop," and included him in its September 2014 list of "10 New Artists You Need to Know." Westword remarked that "channeling influences from vintage soul, R&B and blues, Frost’s sound is unmistakably retro," and added, "his beats, claps and vocals jointly create an identity that is elegant and unique."

== Personal life ==
He has an older brother who is a firefighter at AFD. In April 2017, Frost relocated to Los Angeles, California.

== Discography ==
=== Studio albums ===
- Gold Rush (October 5, 2018)
- Shelby Ave (February 21, 2025)

=== EPs ===
- Low High Low (October 8, 2013)
- Intoxication (September 15, 2015)
- Flying Machines (May 6, 2022)

=== Singles ===
- "White Lies" (October 8, 2013) - US Adult Alt. #29
- "Nice and Slow" (June 16, 2014)
- "Paranoia" (November 10, 2014)
- "Let Me Down Easy" (February 3, 2015)
- "Withdrawal" (September 4, 2015)
- "President" (April 26, 2016)
- "Adderall" (October 14, 2016)
- "Drowning" (with Mike Waters) (March 10, 2017)
- "High All Day" (August 18, 2017)
- "Good Morning" (February 23, 2018) - US Alt. Airplay #32
- "Eleven Days" (August 22, 2018)
- "Money Problems" (October 5, 2018)
- "Sometimes" (September 18, 2019)
- "Perfect Man" (November 1, 2019)
- "Back in the Summer" (January 24, 2020)
- "Sayonara" (May 21, 2020)

=== Collaborations ===
- "Ghosting" by St. Albion feat. Max Frost (2016)
- "Broken Summer" by DJ Snake feat. Max Frost - US Dance/Electronic #34, US Dance/Electronic Digital Sales #25
