= Chaski (Latin American folk music ensemble) =

Based in Austin, Texas, Chaski has performed together since 1985 and has toured the United States, Costa Rica, Venezuela, England, and Scotland. Chaski is featured on the soundtrack of the 2006 IMAX film, Ride Around the World: A Cowboy Adventure. Its five CDs feature selections from Chaski's repertoire from Latin America and Spain on flute, panpipes (zampoñas or sikus), quena, harp, accordion, cuatro, guitar, charango, bombo, maracas, and other instruments.

== Members ==
Adrienne Inglis (b. 1960), flutes, zampoñas, quena

Shana Norton (b. 1957), harp, accordion

Dan Dickey (b. 1953), guitar, charango

== History ==
Chaski began performing classical flute and harp music in April 1985. Venezuelan songs that Adrienne's mother had brought from her homeland gradually made their way into Chaski's repertoire. Shana and Adrienne joined the University of Texas at Austin Brazilian and Andean Music Ensembles to learn more about depth and variety of Latin American music. The success of their expanded repertoire led them to welcome guitarist Dan Dickey into the group in about 1991.

== Discography ==
Chaski (1989), Pacha Mama (1991), El sariri (1995), Unay (2000), Viracocha (2005)
