= Carpetbagger (band) =

American alt-country band

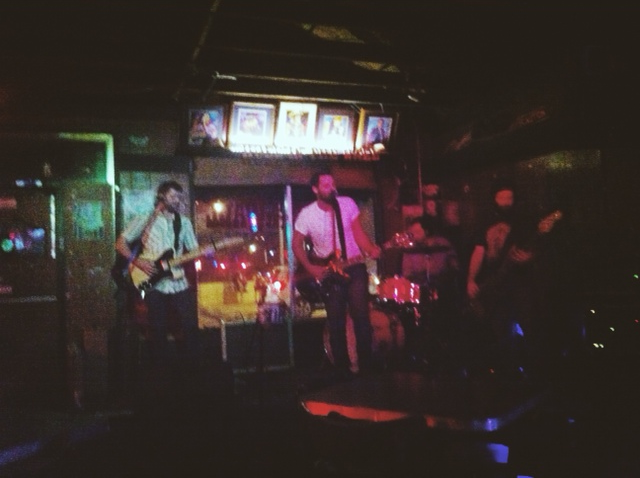
- Carpetbagger performing at Hole in the Wall in May 2014

Background information
- Origin: Austin, Texas, United States
- Genres: Americana; alt-country; southern rock
- Years active: 2012–present
- Members: Greg Loftus; Cody Brown; John Tranum; Bryan McGrath
- Past members: Kevin McCann
- Website: carpetbagger.bandcamp.com

Carpetbagger is an alt-country, Americana band based in Austin, Texas. The band was formed in spring of 2012. Carpetbagger consists of lead vocalist and guitarist Greg Loftus, lead guitarist Cody Brown, bassist John Tranum, and drummer Bryan McGrath.

== History ==
In 2011, Greg Loftus moved from Boston, Massachusetts to Austin, Texas and started the band a year later. The band released its first EP titled "Far Off The Daybreak Call" on August 2, 2013. The album was named after the last stanza of Walt Whitman's poem "O Pioneers". Far Off The Daybreak Call was recorded live over a weekend at Loftus' house in Austin. Kevin McCann recorded drums on the EP. Ben Ballinger and Christy Hays were guest vocalists on the EP. The band's first performance as Carpetbagger with the Far Off The Daybreak Call lineup was at SXSW 2013 on 6th Street. Carpetbagger had residencies at Scoot Inn, Hole in the Wall, and Blackheart.

== Discography ==
=== EP ===
Title	EP details	Tracks
Far Off The Daybreak Call	Released: 2 August 2013; Label: Unsigned; Formats: Digital download	1. "American Bruises"; 2. "My Best Regret"; 3. "New Orleans"; 4. "Highway 59"; 5. "Santa Ana"
