= Do512 =

Do512 is a localized event listings website featuring concerts, drink specials, and other arts and culture events in Austin, Texas. The site typically features 1,000 to 1,500 events per week, and receives around 250,000 unique visitors each month. In 2012 it was named "Best Local Entertainment Website" by The Austin Chronicle.

In 2009 the founders created a spin-off company, DoStuff Media, LLC, which powers a network of similar event listings websites in major cities across North America.

== History ==
Do512 was founded in 2006 by Jimmy Stewart and Scott Owens as a resource for finding happy hours in Austin, Texas. The site’s URL, Do512.com, was picked as an homage to the city of Austin’s telephone area code. Since launch the website has expanded to include other types of lifestyle and entertainment events.

In 2009 Owens and Stewart launched a spin off company, DoStuff Media LLC., to license their event listing technology to similar websites outside of Austin. DoStuff Media currently powers websites in several major cities around North America including New York, Los Angeles, Chicago, San Francisco, Indianapolis, Nashville, Louisville, and Toronto.

By 2011 Do512 was reporting 4.6 million page views and 780,000 unique visitors per year. In 2013 Do512 reported earning $1 million in revenue for the first time.
