= Land of flowers =

The Land of Flowers commonly refers to the Netherlands, known for its floral exports. It may also refer to:

== Places ==
- Florida, whose name comes from Spanish, meaning "The Land of Flowers"
- Assagao, a village in India nicknamed the "Land of Flowers"
- Golestan, a province in Iran, literally translated as "Flower land" or "Land of Flowers"
- Ambato, a city in Ecuador nicknamed "City of Flowers and Fruits"
- Zamboanga City, a city in the Philippines, whose name was derived from the Malay word "Jambangan", meaning "Land of Flowers"
- Tianwei, a township in Taiwan known as the "Land of Flowers" due to its floriculture industry
- Potirendaba, a municipality in Brazil whose name means "Land of Flowers" in the Tupi language

== Media ==
- The Land of Flowers, a book by Elisabetta Dami under the pen name Thea Stilton
- Ziarah Tanah Kudup (translated as Pilgrimage to the Land of Flowers), a 2006 book by Ahmad Kamal Abdullah
- Nangoku no hada, a 1952 Japanese film based on the story "Virginal Land of Flowers" by Seito Fukuda
- The Land of Flowers, one of the four realms in the 2018 American Christmas film The Nutcracker and the Four Realms
- "The Land of Flowers" (花の国), a location in the Japanese light novel and anime series Restaurant to Another World
- "The Land of Flowers" (花の国), the 9th episode of the 2006 Japanese television drama Saiyūki
- "The Land of Flowers" (花の国), an episode from the second season of The Faraway Paladin, a 2023 Japanese anime

== Music ==
- The Land of Flowers, the 6th track from the studio album Death of the Cool by Cotton Mather
