= Craig Marshall =

American singer-songwriter

- Origin: Syracuse, New York, United States
- Genres: Indie, country, Americana, Power pop, rock
- Occupations: Musician, songwriter/artist
- Instruments: Vocals, guitar
- Years active: 1991 – Present
- Labels: Big Ticket Records, Lazy SOB Recordings
- Website: Craig Marshall.com

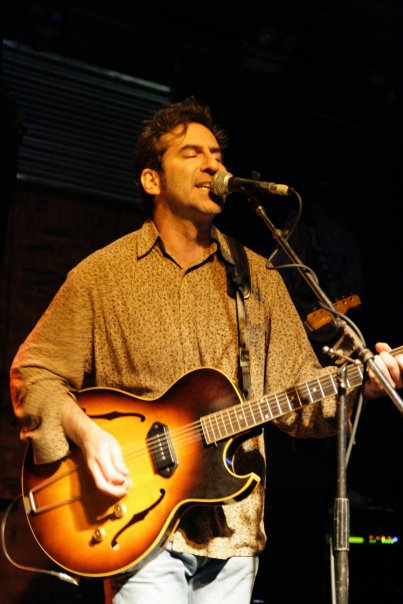
Craig Marshall performing live in concert.

Craig Marshall is an Austin, Texas–based singer-songwriter originally from Syracuse, New York.

== Biography ==
=== Early years ===
Marshall was raised in Syracuse, New York. By the age of 19, Marshall began performing and touring in rock and country bands, touring and performing with his group The Delta Rays.

Marshall has recorded six full-length albums and one EP (in addition to three with jazz/swing band The Lucky Strikes). Point of View was released in 2008. Mixed by Lars Goransson, who is known for his work with artists such as The Cardigans, this album featured an even balance of acoustic and electric guitar.

Marshall's next project, with producer Robert Harrison of Cotton Mather, began in 2011 at Harrison's custom-built recording studio. Harrison is a producer and songwriter best known as the frontman of indie rock groups Cotton Mather and Future Clouds and Radar. The CD releases Hiding In The Doorway in 2012 and After All in 2015 came out of these sessions. A third release, with Harrison producing, is planned for 2017, with much of the tracking already complete.

== Style ==
Marshall's music has been described by a critic from The Austin Chronicle, after the release of Popular Crimes, as "Though the longtime local singer describes this album as "alt-pop," there's very little alt and plenty of pop here, starting with the first track, 'Desperately.'"

== Songs placed in film and television ==
- When Harry Tries To Marry (2011)
- HBO Documentary Film Witness: Libya (2012)
- NCIS (2012)
- My Uncle Rafael (2012)
- Muck (2014)

== Discography ==
- Popular Crimes (2002)
- Before The Fadeaway (2005)
- Point Of View (2008)
- Six Songs To Sunday (2011)
- Hiding In The Doorway (2013)
- After All (2015)

=== With other artists ===
- Trish Murphy (album) Girls Get in Free (2005) – "I Don't Want To Believe" (from Popular Crimes)
- Penny Jo Pullus (album) My Turn to Howl – three tracks (two co-written with Jon Notarthomas)
- Charlie Faye & The Fayettes (album) Charlie Faye & The Fayettes (2016) – "Green Light" (co-written with Charlie Faye)
