= Death of the Cool =

Studio album by Cotton Mather
- Released: July 29, 2016
- Recorded: 2013–2016
- Studio: The Star Apple Kingdom; Sounds Outrageous
- Genre: Rock
- Length: 37:11
- Label: The Star Apple Kingdom
- Producer: Robert Harrison

Cotton Mather chronology
The Big Picture (2001)	Death of the Cool (2016)	Cotton Mather with Nicole Atkins (2016)

Professional ratings
Review scores
Source	Rating
AllMusic	3.5/5 stars
The Austin Chronicle	4/5 stars

Death of the Cool is the fourth full-length studio album by American rock band Cotton Mather, and the first new album from the group since 2001's The Big Picture. Death of the Cool was the first official release from band leader Robert Harrison's "Songs from the I Ching" project.

== Background ==
Cotton Mather had quietly disbanded in 2003, following the muted reception of The Big Picture and numerous personal setbacks. Throughout the remainder of the decade, Robert Harrison remained active in music, studying audio production and fronting the Austin, Texas collective Future Clouds and Radar. During this period, he considered working on a musical project which would assign one song to each hexagram of the I Ching. In 2012, Cotton Mather's Kontiki album was reissued in a deluxe edition, and the group reunited to play several one-off shows promoting its release.

With the other members of Cotton Mather, Harrison began recording songs for the I Ching project in 2013. Throughout the next three years, approximately 30 songs for the project were written and recorded. Harrison opted for a non-linear approach to the writing, instead basing the songs around his own experiences with the I Ching, "in real time and real weather". In March 2016, he began posting the songs on his now-defunct blog. Each post was accompanied by a written commentary in which he described the hexagram using stories from his own experiences, and connected the reading to its corresponding song.

Death of the Cool, released at the end of July, compiled eleven songs from what had been recorded to that point, including several which did not have entries on the blog. As with the writing process, the songs were not chosen or organized by their hexagram numbers, but rather by what Harrison thought would make the strongest album.

== Artwork ==
The album's cover depicts a car buried in snow. This is a reference to the last song on the album, "The End of DeWitt Finley", which tells the true story of a salesman who died after his car was trapped in a snowbank. Finley, a devout follower of God, opted not to attempt escape, but instead to wait for rescue, if that was God's plan. Harrison's brother, poet Joseph Harrison, also wrote about Finley, in a poem sharing the same title as the song, published in his 2003 collection Someone Else's Name. The poem was included on Harrison's Songs from the I Ching blog.

The inside gatefold of the album depicts the interior of the car. In addition to things like musical instruments, recording gear, and books, the car is filled with Cotton Mather CDs, 7" singles, photos, and newspaper reviews, as well as sticky notes each bearing one of the album's song titles. The interior photo was taken by Valerie Fremin.

== Track listing ==
All tracks are written by Robert Harrison.

No.	Title	Corresponding hexagram	Length
1.	"The Book of Too Late Changes"	The Return (24)	3:27
2.	"Close to the Sun"	The Creative (1)	3:37
3.	"The Middle of Nowhere"	The Receptive (2)	5:02
4.	"Candy Lilac"	Union (8)	2:25
5.	"The Life of the Liar"	Conflict (6)	2:50
6.	"The Land of Flowers"	Beginning (3)	4:05
7.	"Never Be It"	Waiting (5)	3:17
8.	"Queen of Swords"	Falling Away (23)	3:06
9.	"Waters Raging"	The Abysmal (29)	2:43
10.	"Child Bride"	Youthful Folly (4)	2:49
11.	"The End of DeWitt Finley"	Standstill (12)	3:50
Total length:			37:11

== Personnel ==
Musicians

- Robert Harrison
- Whit Williams
- Darin Murphy
- George Reiff
- Dana Myzer
- Josh Gravelin
- Kullen Fuchs
- Hollie Thomas
- Rick Richards
- Derek Morris
- Anthony Farrell
- Vince Delgado

Technical

- Robert Harrison (production, recording)
- Lars Göransson (production, recording, mixing, mastering)
- George Reiff (mixing)
- Bob Ohlsson (mastering)
