= The Lucky Strikes =

American swing band

- Origin: Austin, Texas, U.S.
- Genres: Swing; jazz
- Years active: 1993–present
- Labels: Lazy SOB, Big Ticket
- Members: Craig Marshall; Milan Moorman; Freddie Mendoza
- Past members: Sebastian Santa Maria; Michael Henderson; Dave Miller; David Levy; Elias Haslanger
- Website: luckystrikes.com

The Lucky Strikes is a contemporary swing band which achieved mainstream success during the swing revival of the late 1990s. The band was formed in 1989 by guitarist and vocalist Craig Marshall with Milan Moorman (trumpet), Brian Copeland (bassist), and Freddie Mendoza (trombone).

== History ==
Formed in 1993 in Austin, Texas, the group based its style on swing, jazz, and lounge music. Singer Craig Marshall was an avid fan of Frank Sinatra, Dean Martin Nat King Cole and Harry Connick Jr. Mendoza, a native of San Antonio, Texas, had toured and performed with Dizzy Gillespie, Wynton Marsalis, Clark Terry, Frank Foster, Bill Watrous, Rob McConnell, Bob Mintzer, and Harry Connick Jr.

During the late 1990s swing revival, the Lucky Strikes toured and performed at premiere events in Hollywood, celebrating the release of the 1996 film Swingers, which was written by Jon Favreau and directed by Doug Liman. In early 1998, the band visited Canada and performed several sold-out shows. In 2000, the band appeared in the film Just Sue Me. The band has toured and performed with Rod Stewart, Squirrel Nut Zippers, Big Bad Voodoo Daddy, Royal Crown Revue, Cherry Poppin' Daddies and the Brian Setzer Orchestra.

== Discography ==
- Twelve Past Midnight! (1996)
- Song and Dance (1998)
- A Perfect Evening (2001)
