= Legends of the Super Heroes =

Studio album by Beaver Nelson
- Released: November 19, 2002
- Recorded: November 2001–August 2002
- Genres: Country music, singer/songwriter
- Length: 40:37
- Label: Freedom Records

Beaver Nelson chronology
| Undisturbed (2001) | Legends of the Super Heroes (2002) | Motion (2004) |

Legends of the Super Heroes is a 2002 album by Austin, Texas based singer-songwriter Beaver Nelson, released on Freedom Records.

== Reviews ==
Professional ratings
Review scores
| Source | Rating |
|---|---|
| Allmusic | 4/5 stars |
| Robert Christgau | (choice cut) |
| Austin Chronicle | 4/4 stars |
| Paste Magazine | (positive) |
| Portland Phoenix | (positive) |

== Track listing ==
1. Clean it Up
2. Baloney Bay
3. Digging a Well
4. Anything Easy Left
5. Chameleon Brain
6. Government-Sanctioned Hayride
7. Sleep (No Rest)
8. It Seems So Simple
9. Last Summer
10. Mile Markers
11. Some Day Just Like Today
