= Cotton Mather (band) =

American rock band

- Origin: Austin, Texas, US
- Genres: Rock, pop, experimental
- Years active: 1991–2003, 2012–present
- Labels: ELM Records, Copper Records, Rainbow Quartz, The Star Apple Kingdom
- Members: Robert Harrison; Whit Williams; Darin Murphy
- Past members: Nat Shelton; Wendy March; Owen McMahon; Matt Hovis; Greg Thibeaux; George Reiff; Dana Myzer; Josh Gravelin

Cotton Mather is an American rock band from Austin, Texas, founded by Robert Harrison in 1990. Although the group started out as an experimental duo featuring guitar and cello, they evolved into a four-piece rock group with a sound centered around guitars and vocal harmonies. The group was initially active from 1990 to 2003, but returned from a nine-year hiatus in 2012 and have been active ever since. They have drawn comparisons to the Beatles, Elvis Costello and the Attractions, Squeeze, and Guided by Voices. In his 2007 book, Shake Some Action, John Borack rated the Kontiki album at number 26 of his Top 200 Power Pop Albums of all time, comparing the album to Revolver-era Beatles, Big Star, and The Apples in Stereo. NME suggested Cotton Mather might be "the most exciting guitar pop band since Supergrass."

== History ==
=== Early years (1990-1996) ===
Cotton Mather started as an experimental art rock collaboration between Harrison and cellist Nat Shelton. Harrison has jokingly stated that the music the duo made "might have convinced people I could have gone to graduate school, had that been my ultimate design". Cotton Mather began to shift away from avant-garde music quickly, however, towards a more traditional rock sound, particularly after Shelton moved away from Austin in 1991. With Harrison on guitar and vocals, Whit Williams on guitar and backing vocals, Matt Hovis on bass, and Greg Thibeaux on drums, the group recorded at Ardent Studios in Memphis and released their debut album, Cotton Is King, on the short-lived ELM Records label. After the commercial failure of that album, Hovis and Thibeaux left the group, and Harrison and Williams, occasionally aided by bassist George Reiff and drummers Dana Myzer and Darin Murphy, began writing and recording what would become their second album.

=== Success of Kontiki and release of The Big Picture (1997-2003) ===
Kontiki was recorded primarily on 4-track cassette and ADAT and included elements of found sound and psychedelic experimentation. While the bulk of the album was recorded piece-by-piece via overdubbing, Harrison refers to the three tracks recorded by the live band to be "the spine of the record", showcasing the band's rock and roll sound. Nashville musician Brad Jones helped to mix and compile the album when recording was complete. While unsuccessful upon release in America in 1997, the album was reissued in 1999 in England on the Rainbow Quartz label, championed by Noel and Liam Gallagher of Oasis, among others.

The recording of the band's third album, The Big Picture, began in 1998 with Brad Jones producing. When Kontiki was reissued in England and became a success, the sessions for the third album were almost done, but Harrison held off on releasing it. Instead, the group recorded the EP Hotel Baltimore, which consisted of a re-recording of "Lost My Motto" from Cotton is King, three outtakes from Kontiki, and three new songs. By 2000, The Big Picture was finished, mixed by producer Dave Fridmann, and shopped to numerous labels before finally being released by Rainbow Quartz in October 2001.

=== Hiatus and other projects (2003-2011) ===
The release of The Big Picture was not a success, and numerous personal setbacks and issues with the label caused the band to go on hiatus in 2003. After this, the various members went on to pursue their own projects. George Reiff remained active in the music scene as a performer and producer, working with Chris Robinson, Court Yard Hounds, Dixie Chicks, Jakob Dylan, and Bruce Robison, among others. Similarly, Josh Gravelin went on to work with Ian Moore, Alejandro Escovedo, Guy Forsyth, Sparkwood, Beaver Nelson, Oxford Files, Nakia, Ray Wylie Hubbard, and more. Whit Williams and Dana Myzer joined Ron Flynt as the group Stockton, who released an album in 2007; Myzer relocated to London and joined the group Farrah. Williams also released several books of poetry under his full name, Harold Whit Williams. Kevin Whitley, who played drums in an early incarnation of Cotton Mather, joined forces with original bassist Matt Hovis and 16 Deluxe vocalist Carrie Clark, and the trio, under the name The Pretty Please, released an EP in 2004 produced by Robert Harrison.

Harrison founded The Star Apple Kingdom in 2007, a name under which he categorizes all of his work as a producer and artist. As a record label, the first Star Apple Kingdom release was the eponymous debut by Future Clouds and Radar, released in 2007. Although the double album was essentially a Robert Harrison solo project, it included contributions from George Reiff, Josh Gravelin, Darin Murphy, Brad Jones, and Dave Fridmann. The following year, Future Clouds and Radar released a second album, titled Peoria.

=== Reunion (2012-present) ===
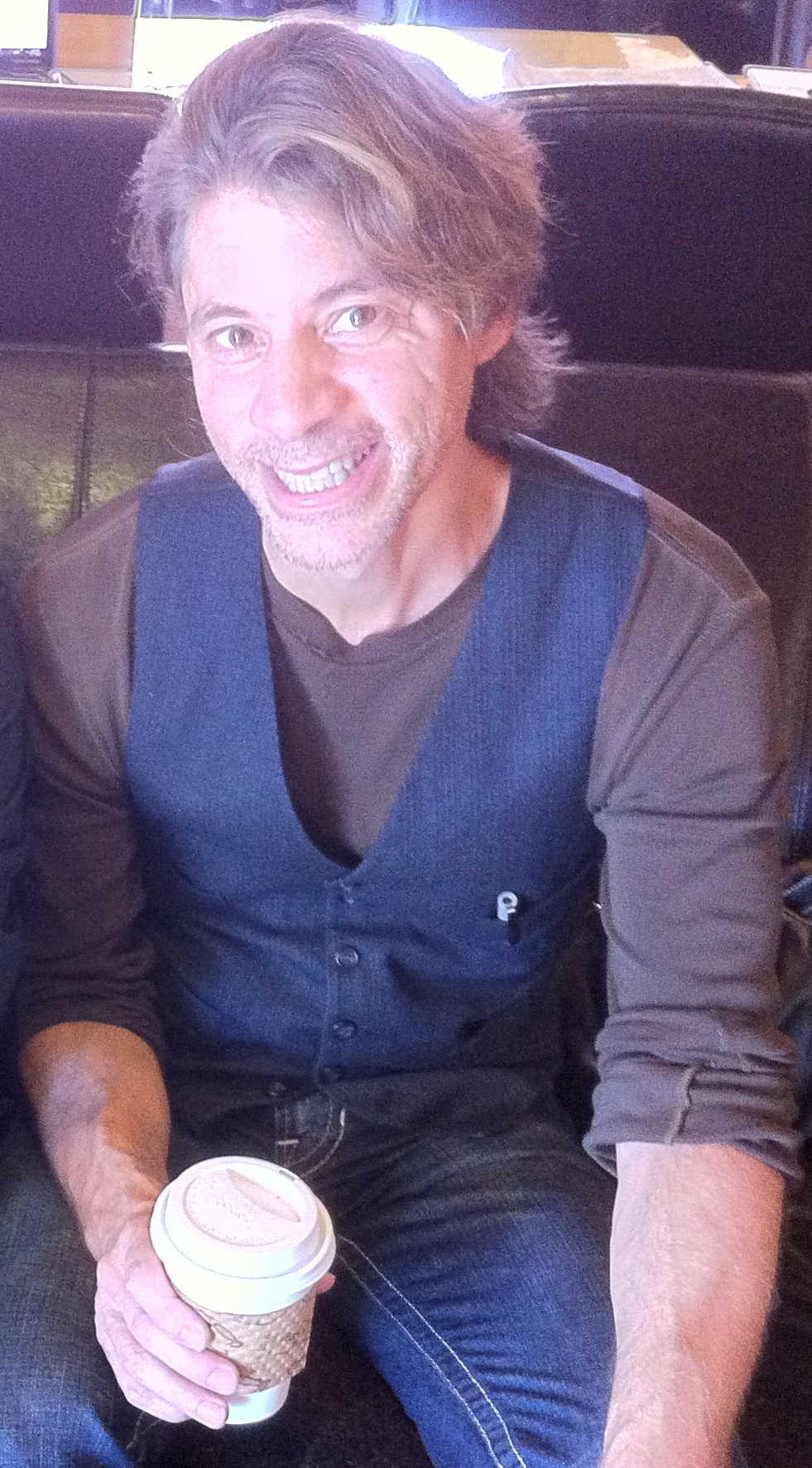
Robert Harrison in 2012

During Cotton Mather's hiatus, the group still retained a degree of success, as "Lily Dreams On" from Kontiki appeared on the soundtrack of the television show Veronica Mars, and "Lost My Motto" from Hotel Baltimore was included on Steven Van Zandt's compilation The Coolest Songs In The World. The reputation of Kontiki began to grow in underground music circles, and in 2011, Harrison organized an expanded reissue of the album. Kontiki Deluxe Edition was released in the spring of 2012 and featured a bonus CD of outtakes from the album's sessions. The group played several live shows in 2012, and also released a 7" single containing two tracks recorded during the sessions for The Big Picture which had not been previously released, featuring Ian McLagan on organ.

The reunited group played several shows in support of the Kontiki reissue. Although the shows were meant to be one-off performances, the group eventually began performing and recording again as a functioning band. By this time, Dana Myzer and Josh Gravelin were no longer readily available, so the line-up, although flexible, generally centered around Harrison, Williams, Reiff, and Murphy.

In 2016, Death of the Cool was released on the Star Apple Kingdom label. It was the first release of Harrison's "Songs from the I Ching" project, in which Harrison composed songs based on or relating to each of the 64 hexagrams of the I Ching. The album was met with critical acclaim, and three more songs from the project, featuring singer Nicole Atkins, were released at the end of the year. 2017 saw two more releases from the project: the full-length album Wild Kingdom, and the six-song Young Life EP. Long-time bassist and producer George Reiff fell ill toward the end of 2016, during the compilation and release of these albums and EPs, and died from lung cancer in May 2017.

During 2018, the group did not release any new material. Through PledgeMusic, they attempted to raise money for the recording of a new album, but fell short of their goal; Harrison later stated that he took most of the year off to recuperate from the loss of Reiff and other changes in his personal life. Following the failed PledgeMusic campaign, Harrison began to look into other funding ventures, starting a Patreon campaign in February 2019. During 2019, Harrison released 16 new songs from the I Ching project to patrons, as well as many unreleased Cotton Mather recordings and videos detailing the band's history, especially during the time of Kontiki and The Big Picture. The Patreon project continued into 2020.

== Name ==
The band gets its name from 17th century Puritan preacher and author Cotton Mather, a minister at Boston's North Church. While trying to cheer each other up after their uncle's funeral, Harrison and his brother were making joking suggestions for his new band's name. When his brother suggested Cotton Mather, Harrison, a student of theology, said that it was "the funniest name for a band I've ever heard".

== Discography ==
=== Albums ===
- The Crafty Flower Arranger (1992) (demos recorded to secure a record contract)
- Cotton is King (1994, ELM Records)
- Kontiki (1997, Copper Records; 1999, Rainbow Quartz; 2012, Star Apple Kingdom)
- The Big Picture (2001, Rainbow Quartz)
- Death of the Cool (2016, Star Apple Kingdom)
- Wild Kingdom (2017, Star Apple Kingdom)
- Buffalo Nickels (2019, self-released)

=== EPs ===
- Hotel Baltimore (1999, Rainbow Quartz)
- Cotton Mather With Nicole Atkins (2016, Star Apple Kingdom)
- Young Life EP (2017, Star Apple Kingdom)

=== Singles ===
- Payday (1993, Biffco)
- She's Only Cool (1999, Rainbow Quartz)
- Password (1999, Rainbow Quartz)
- My Before And After (1999, Rainbow Quartz)
- 40 Watt Solution (2001, Rainbow Quartz)
- I'll Be Gone/Animal Show (2012, Euclid)
- The Book Of Too Late Changes (2016, Star Apple Kingdom)
- Eleanor Plunge (2017, Star Apple Kingdom)
