= Beaver Nelson =

American singer

Beaver Nelson is an Austin-based singer-songwriter. His most recent release is A Friend From Out of Town which was released in 2023.

While Beaver Nelson has long drawn critical acclaim from the music press including such publications as Texas Monthly magazine, he enjoys the support of a passionate fan base in Japan. Texas' gift to songwriting and bar room philosophy, Beaver was called a songwriting prodigy at the age of 18 by Rolling Stone and is making up for lost time (ten years signed to major labels and 2 shelved CDs) with four releases in five years.

== Early career ==
Nelson got his start in Houston playing various venues and releasing two albums when he was still in high school. He moved from Houston to Austin in 1991 and began playing the thriving live music scene at such places as the Chicago House, Cactus Cafe and The Hole in the Wall.

Though Nelson is a Texas-based musician, he has mixed feelings about what that means these days. He told Rolling Stone Magazine in 2002, "I have a real love/hate thing going with the Texas songwriter thing. There used to be some really great songwriters that were coming out of Texas and had been for years but these people just happened to be from Texas. And every once in a while in a song they would mention something about Texas. I'm sitting here, writing songs, and I'm watching people to my left and right, and Texas is in every fourth title of their songs. Or Lone Star beer is in the chorus, and these people are 'Texas songwriters.' It's just not my thing.'"

== Discography ==
=== Albums ===
- Last Hurrah (1998)
- Little Brother (2000)
- Undisturbed (2001)
- Legends of the Super Heroes (2002)
- Motion (2004)
- Exciting Opportunity (2007)
- "Macro/Micro" (2012)
- Positive (2016)
- A Friend From Out of Town (2023)

=== Other contributions ===
- 107.1 KGSR Radio Austin - Broadcasts Vol.10 (2002) – "The Beauty in Store"
