= List of The Faraway Paladin episodes =

The Faraway Paladin is a Japanese anime series based on the light novel series of the same name written by Kanata Yanagino and illustrated by Kususaga Rin. An anime adaptation was announced on April 17, 2021. The series is animated by Children's Playground Entertainment and directed by Yuu Nobuta, with Tatsuya Takahashi overseeing the series' scripts, Koji Haneda designing the characters, and Ryūichi Takada and Keigo Hoashi from MONACA composing the music. It aired on Tokyo MX, AT-X, and BS NTV from October 9, 2021, to January 3, 2022. The opening theme is "The Sacred Torch" performed by H-el-ical//, while the ending theme is "Shirushibi" (標火; "Mark of Fire") performed by Nagi Yanagi.

On December 25, 2021, a second season was announced to be in production. Titled The Faraway Paladin: The Lord of Rust Mountain, it will be produced by OLM and Sunrise Beyond, with Akira Iwanaga directing the season, and Tatsuya Arai designing the characters alongside Koji Haneda. The season aired from October 7 to December 23, 2023. The opening theme is "Meika" (命火; "Fire of Life") performed by Nagi Yanagi, while the ending theme is "Puzzle" (パズル) performed by Kotoko.

Crunchyroll has licensed the series outside of Asia and Oceania (excluding Australia and Zealand), while Medialink licensed the series in South Asia, Southeast Asia, and the rest of Oceania, and co-licensed with Disney+ through Star content hub in Taiwan, Hong Kong and selected Southeast Asia countries. On October 28, 2021, Crunchyroll announced the series will receive an English dub, which premiered on November 27, 2021. On October 20, 2023, Crunchyroll announced that the second season will begin airing its dub the following day.

== Series overview ==
Season	Episodes	Originally released	
Season	Episodes	First released	Last released
1	12	October 9, 2021	January 3, 2022
2	12	October 7, 2023	December 23, 2023

== Episode list ==
=== Season 1 (2021–22) ===
No.	Title	Directed by	Written by	Storyboarded by	Original release date
1	"The Boy from the City of the Dead"; Transliteration: "Shisha no Machi no Shōnen" (Japanese: 死者の街の少年)	Shin Matsuo	Tatsuya Takahashi	Yū Nobuta	October 9, 2021 (Note: Episodes 1 and 2 were pre-screened on September 26, 2021.)
After passing away, a man reincarnates in a fantasy-like world as Will, an orphan raised by three undead warriors: Blood, the skeleton swordsman, Mary, the mummified priestess and Gus, the ghost sorcerer.
2	"The Wandering Sage"; Transliteration: "Hōkō no Kenja" (Japanese: 彷徨の賢者)	Shunji Yoshida	Tatsuya Takahashi	Hidetoshi Namura	October 16, 2021
A few years later, Will focuses on his training so that he can learn to fend for himself. With his coming of age ceremony at hand, he also must prepare for the day he will part ways with his foster family.
3	"Payday"; Transliteration: "Yakusoku no Hi" (Japanese: 約束の日)	Naoki Murata	Gōto Aogiri	Ichizō Kobayashi	October 23, 2021
The day of Will's coming of age arrives, and Blood, Mary and Gus explain to him how two hundred years ago they battled the Demon High King who was ravaging the land, and were aided by Stagnate, God of the Undead, in sealing him away in exchange for their service as the High King's undead guardians. Right after Will passes his trial, Stagnate appears to collect on their debt.
4	"The Goddess of the Divine Torch"; Transliteration: "Tomoshibi no Megami" (Japanese: 灯火の女神)	Matsuo Asami	Gōto Aogiri	Hiroshi Matsuzono	October 30, 2021
Because they have lost their connection to the task Stagnate has given them by raising Will, Stagnate has come to collect Blood, Mary and Gus' souls, but also takes notice of Will himself. After Stagnate is driven off, the anguished Will confesses to his foster family that he was reincarnated from another world. Finally finding his purpose in life in saving them from damnation, Will pledges himself to Gracefeel, Goddess of Light, and gains her divine protection.
5	"The Helmet of Will"; Transliteration: "Ishi no Kabuto" (Japanese: 意志の兜)	Shin Matsuo	Tatsuya Takahashi	Yū Nobuta	November 6, 2021
Stagnate returns once more to collect the souls of Will's family, but with some intervention by Mater, Mary's deity, Will is able to vanquish the evil god. Their souls saved, Blood and Mary die in peace. Gus, the only one remaining with Gracefeel's blessing to keep guarding the High King, sends Will out into the world with a new name: G. Maryblood, in honor of his adopted family. An after-credit scene details an exchange between Blood and Mary on the last day of their mortal lives about their future as a family.
6	"Archer of Beast Woods"; Transliteration: "Kemono no Mori no Ite" (Japanese: 獣の森の射手)	Yūsuke Onoda	Tatsuya Takahashi	Hidetoshi Namura	November 13, 2021
On his way to seek out human habitation, Will encounters Menel, a half-elf archer and hunter, but they remain wary of each other until they part ways. The following night, however, a revelation sent by Gracefeel leads Will to a nearby outsider village which is being attacked by a band of raiders led by Menel. After Will bloodlessly subdues them, the raiders reveal that a demon horde has decimated their village, leading to the attack. After offering reparations with the treasures given to him by Gus, Will declares to cleanse the demon-occupied village with Menel's help.
7	"Traumatic Memory"; Transliteration: "Sangeki no Kioku" (Japanese: 惨劇の記憶)	Naoki Murata	Tatsuya Takahashi	Hiroshi Matsuzono	November 20, 2021
Arriving at the village, Will and Menel defeat the demons occupying it and grant those villagers who were turned into undead a peaceful passing into the afterlife. The last of them, the ghost of village wisewoman Maple, informs them of a stronghold from whence the demons were sent before she leaves, and after the surviving villagers have returned, Menel, as a way to atone for his past misdeeds in life, entrusts himself to Will's spiritual guidance.
7.5	"Recap Episode: The Path Taken"; Transliteration: "Sōshūhen Michiyuki" (Japanese: 総集編 道行)	Tomo Ishii	N/A	N/A	November 27, 2021
A recap episode summarizing the events of episodes 1 to 7.
8	"Songs of Heroism"; Transliteration: "Eiketsu no Uta" (Japanese: 英傑の詩)	Takahiro Hirata	Gōto Aogiri	Ichizō Kobayashi	December 4, 2021
While travelling to the port town of Whitesails to purchase supplies for rebuilding the village, Will and Menel rescue wandering trader Tonio and his partner, halfling bard Robina "Bee" Goodfellow from a rabid giant ape. They decide to continue their travels together, and Will ends up learning from Bee how his foster parents once vanquished a wyvern to save the lives of a half-elf girl and her boyfriend. On their way, Tonio relates that a royal succession struggle might be brewing between the previous king's successor, Prince Owen, and his brother, rightful crown prince and Whitesail's ruler, Prince Ethelbald Rex Fertile.
9	"Whitesails"; Transliteration: "Howaitoseiruzu" (Japanese: 白帆の都(ホワイトセイルズ))	Matsuo Asami	Gōto Aogiri	Hidetoshi Namura	December 11, 2021
Will's group reaches Whitesails, where he meets local bishop Bart Bageley and learns how faith in Gracefeel has diminished since the war with the High King. Shortly after, the town is attacked by a wyvern, and with the city guard being unable to fight it, Will and Menel team up to defeat it, which earns Will the title Wyvern Killer. This draws the attention of Prince Ethelbald, who requests Will to meet him. Will uses the opportunity to ask for troops to fight the recent demon incursions from the Beast Woods. When Ethelbald declares that he is unable to do so, Will instead asks for permission to hire adventurers and mercenaries to combat this threat on his own.
10	"Renowned Glory"; Transliteration: "Bukun no Kagayaki" (Japanese: 武勲の輝き)	Yūsuke Onoda	Gōto Aogiri	Hiroshi Matsuzono	December 18, 2021
Despite his reservations about Will's request, which could very well be used to challenge his authority, and Bishop Bagley's scepticism, Ethelbald decides to grant it, and has Will elevated to a paladin in the bargain. They start looking for hired help in their task; the first to take that offer is a rugged but renowned warrior named Reystov. The next day, Will is made a knight and paladin of the Southmark.
11	"Valley of Despair"; Transliteration: "Zetsubō no Tani" (Japanese: 絶望の谷)	Naoki Murata	Tatsuya Takahashi	Hiroyuki Ōshima	December 25, 2021
Will and his friends start their relief efforts in the villages near Beast Woods. When a scouting party goes missing in the forest, Will, Menel and Reystov investigate and run into an ambush by a large horde of demon beasts led by a chimera. While Will manages to repel the beasts, the powers granted by Gracefeel appear to desert him, which leaves Mendel seriously injured. Remorseful about his supposed arrogance of trusting the people he had pledged to protect to keep him safe, Will takes his leave, resolving to confront the demons on his own to avoid endangering his friends.
12	"The Faraway Paladin"; Transliteration: "Saihate no Paradin" (Japanese: 最果ての聖騎士(パラディン))	Shin Matsuo	Tatsuya Takahashi	Yū Nobuta	January 3, 2022 (Note: This episode has been delayed to Monday, January 3rd 2022, airing at 10:30 p.m. JST, 30 minutes after the original air time on Tokyo MX.)
Will is intercepted by Menel, who refuses to let him go off without a fight, forcing Will to relent and return to the village. Together with their companions, they begin to work out a plan to eliminate the demon beasts, and Will and Menel fight their way to the demon chief's hideout. Confronted by the chimera, Will realizes that the demon beasts were summoned to clear the Beast Woods of human habitation so that demons could take over the City of the Dead and enable the High King's release. While Will and Menel defeat the chimera, Reystov slips past them and kills the chief demon. As the village celebrates, Menel suggests that, with this victory, Will is in a good position to assume official governorship over the Beast Wood; and after some reluctance, Will acknowledges its merits for his mission to re-promote Gracefeel's faith.

=== Season 2 (2023) ===
No. overall	No. in season	Title	Directed by	Written by	Storyboarded by	Original release date
13	1	"The Paladin and the Troubadour"; Transliteration: "Seikishi to Shijin" (Japanese: 聖騎士と詩人)	Kaito Asakura	Tatsuya Takahashi	Kaito Asakura	October 7, 2023
Ethelbald invites Will to a celebration of the new year in Whitesails. He attends with Bee, who says she wants to visit the magic Academy afterward. They meet the gatekeeper who judge them worthy and grant them access to the library which is where Bee wanted to go. She wanted more information on a sorcerer and a hero she once knew tha had gone back into obscurity so she could write a song and bring them back into the light.
14	2	"The Mad Forest"; Transliteration: "Kurueru Mori" (Japanese: 狂える森)	Masashi Abe	Tatsuya Takahashi	Kaito Asakura	October 14, 2023
Will and Menel investigate why the seasons are not changing as they should in the surrounding forest. Two wise lord of the forest may have the answer they seek as well as those pesky demons in the way. One of the lord gives a warning of what is yet to come and they premust prepare in anticipation of that warning.
15	3	"The Last King"; Transliteration: "Saigo no Ō" (Japanese: 最後の王)	Nobuyoshi Habara	Shōta Gotō	Akio Takami	October 21, 2023
16	4	"The Meaning of Courage"; Transliteration: "Yūki no Imi" (Japanese: 勇気の意味)	Akira Yamada	Shōta Gotō	Akira Yamada	October 28, 2023
17	5	"The Messenger in the Burial Chamber"; Transliteration: "Genshitsu no Tsukai" (Japanese: 玄室の遣い)	Tatsunari Koyano	Tatsuya Takahashi	Akio Takami	November 4, 2023
18	6	"A Brief Return Home"; Transliteration: "Hitotoki no Kikyō" (Japanese: ひとときの帰郷)	Yoshitsugu Kimura	Shōta Gotō	Atsushi Ōtsuki	November 11, 2023
19	7	"Asleep Beneath the Water"; Transliteration: "Minasoko no Nemuri" (Japanese: 水底の眠り)	Nobuyoshi Habara	Shōta Gotō	Itsuro Kawasaki	November 18, 2023
20	8	"The Land of Flowers"; Transliteration: "Hana no Kuni" (Japanese: 花の国)	Unknown	Unknown	TBA	November 25, 2023
21	9	"A Warrior's Fire"; Transliteration: "Senshi no Honō" (Japanese: 戦士の炎)	Unknown	Unknown	TBA	December 2, 2023
22	10	"The Lord of the Rust Mountains"; Transliteration: "Tetsusabi no Yama no Ou" (Japanese: 鉄錆の山の王)	Unknown	Unknown	TBA	December 9, 2023
23	11	"The Evil Dragon and the Goddess"; Transliteration: "Yokoshima Ryū to Megami" (Japanese: 邪竜と女神)	Unknown	Unknown	TBA	December 16, 2023
24	12	"Calldawn"; Transliteration: "Yoake Yobu Mono" (Japanese: 夜明け呼ぶもの)	Unknown	Unknown	TBA	December 23, 2023
