= Kontiki (album) =

Studio album by Cotton Mather
- Released: November 26, 1997
- Recorded: 1995–1997
- Studio: Music Lane (Austin, Texas); El Rancho Gordo (Austin, Texas); Alex the Great (Nashville, Tennessee)
- Genre: Rock and roll, pop rock, psychedelic rock
- Length: 40:01
- Label: Copper Records
- Producer: Robert Harrison with Whit Williams and Brad Jones

Cotton Mather chronology
Cotton is King (1994)	Kontiki (1997)	Hotel Baltimore (1999)

Professional ratings
Review scores
Source	Rating
AllMusic	4.5/5 stars
The Austin Chronicle	5/5 stars
Boston Phoenix	4/4 stars
Mojo	favorable
MSN Music (Expert Witness)	B+
NME	7/10
Option	favorable
PopMatters	8/10
Trouser Press	favorable
Uncut	4/5 stars

Kontiki (sometimes Kon Tiki) is the second studio album by American rock band Cotton Mather. The album incorporates rock, pop, and psychedelic music, as well as elements of found sound and field recordings, reflecting the group's origins as an experimental act. It was recorded on four-track cassette and ADAT, leading to a rough, homemade sound. Originally released in 1997, Kontiki did not see any success until a 1999 re-release in England. In 2012, it was reissued on the Star Apple Kingdom label, with a bonus CD of extra tracks, as Kontiki Deluxe Edition.

The album is named after the 1947 Kon-Tiki expedition, although band leader Robert Harrison deliberately condensed the name down to one word for the album's title.

== Background and recording ==
Following the commercial failure of the group's first album, Cotton is King, bassist Matt Hovis and drummer Greg Thibeaux left the group and were replaced by George Reiff and Dana Myzer, respectively, both of whom were involved with several local bands around Austin. Initial recordings with producer Dave McNair did not yield the results that Harrison was looking for, leading McNair to suggest Harrison produce the album himself.

Harrison's friend Joe McDermott owned a small house in Leander, Texas, which had a small recording setup. Harrison and Whit Williams began writing and recording what would become Kontiki at the house, on McDermott's ADAT machine and Harrison's 4-track cassette. At first, Harrison had doubts that the music would be taken seriously due to the quality of the recording gear, but the encouragement of former bassist Matt Hovis towards the material pushed him to continue the recording. Reiff, Myzer, and Darin Murphy contributed to the recordings made in Leander via overdubbing, but the basic tracks of "Camp Hill Rail Operator", "Password", and "She's Only Cool" were also recorded live to tape in Harrison's living room, with assistance from Dave McNair.

When the recording was done, Harrison contacted Nashville musician and producer Brad Jones, and the two assembled the album from the various cassettes and ADATs the songs existed on. For his assistance in assembling the album, as well as suggesting and recording several overdubs, Harrison gave Jones a co-production credit. Jones said that if he was listed as a producer, listeners would think that he had done the bulk of the production, rather than Harrison; years later, many sources still incorrectly cite Jones as the album's primary producer.

== Release and reception ==
Kontiki was released on November 26, 1997, on Copper Records. Despite receiving highly positive reviews and being played on independent radio stations, listeners had difficulty finding the album in stores because Copper had only produced a limited amount of CD copies. Harrison felt, based on the reviews, that the album could have been a success had it been distributed properly. The disappointment of this would inform his next batch of songs, which would become The Big Picture.

Following the album's muted release, a copy was played at a party hosted by Ron Wood of the Rolling Stones. Noel Gallagher of Oasis, in attendance at the party, tracked down a copy of the album and began to praise Cotton Mather in interviews. Following this, the label Rainbow Quartz International licensed the album and released it in the UK in 1999, along with three singles from it. Cotton Mather performed in the UK, opening for Oasis, in 2000. An electric version of "Spin My Wheels", recorded during the early sessions with Dave McNair, was included on a bonus track on the Japanese CD edition, also released in 1999.

Cotton Mather entered a hiatus in 2003, following the muted reception of 2001's The Big Picture. During this period, artists such as Nicole Atkins and Britt Daniel of Spoon praised the album in interviews, and "Lily Dreams On" was used in the 2005 television series Veronica Mars. With copies of the CD becoming increasingly hard to find, Harrison launched a Kickstarter project in 2011 to reissue Kontiki with a second CD of bonus tracks. The campaign was a success, and the expanded reissue, titled Kontiki Deluxe Edition, was released on February 14, 2012. In addition to the bonus disc, Harrison wrote an essay in the CD booklet detailing the creation and recording of the album, which included contributions from George Reiff, Dana Myzer, Dave McNair, Darin Murphy, Whit Williams, and Brad Jones.

During the summer of 2019, Harrison provided an in-depth look at the process of writing and recording Kontiki via his Patreon. This included unlisted YouTube videos discussing the tracks in detail, a home-made CD-R containing the mixes Harrison originally sent to Brad Jones, instrumental mixes of several tracks, and a downloadable folder containing the stems for eight of the album's songs.

== Track listing ==
=== Original Release ===
All tracks are written by Robert Harrison.

No.	Title	Length
1.	"Camp Hill Rail Operator"	3:21
2.	"Homefront Cameo"	3:11
3.	"Spin My Wheels"	3:29
4.	"My Before And After"	2:53
5.	"Private Ruth"	3:04
6.	"Vegetable Row"	5:01
7.	"Aurora Bori Alice"	2:38
8.	"Church of Wilson"	2:01
9.	"Lily Dreams On"	2:50
10.	"Password"	3:12
11.	"Animal Show Drinking Song"	1:16
12.	"Prophecy for the Golden Age"	0:56
13.	"She's Only Cool"	2:31
14.	"Autumn's Birds"	3:37
Total length:		40:01

=== Japanese Release Bonus Track ===
No.	Title	Length
15.	"Spin My Wheels (Electric Version)"	4:07
Total length:		44:08

=== Kontiki Deluxe Edition Bonus Disc ===
No.	Title	Length
1.	"Homefront Cameo (4-Track)"	3:12
2.	"Pine Box Builder (No. 1)"	2:40
3.	"Camp Hill Rail Operator (Acoustic)"	2:41
4.	"Little Star"	5:36
5.	"Baby Freeze Queen (No. 1)"	1:19
6.	"Altar Boy (Live to ADAT)"	2:41
7.	"Flying Annie's Kite"	3:06
8.	"Innocent Street (Acoustic)"	3:11
9.	"Spin My Wheels (Electric)"	3:32
10.	"Church Of Wilson (4-Track)"	1:51
11.	"Private Ruth (Acoustic)"	2:30
12.	"The Gold Gone Days"	2:37
Total length:		34:57

== Personnel ==
=== Musicians ===
- Robert Harrison - vocals, guitar, keyboards, drums, percussion
- Whit Williams - vocals, guitar
- Dana Myzer - drums
- George Reiff - bass
- Darin Murphy - drums
- Brad Jones - percussion
- Greg Thibeaux - drums on "Vegetable Row"

=== Technical ===
- Robert Harrison - recording, mixing, production
- Brad Jones - mixing, co-production
- Whit Williams - co-production
- John Croslin - recording (drums on "Vegetable Row")
- Mark Wilder - mastering
- Dave McNair - recording (bonus disc only)
- Lars Göransson - mixing, mastering (bonus disc only)
