= Future Clouds and Radar =

Powerpop musical group

- Origin: Austin, Texas, United States
- Genres: Rock, psychedelic rock, art rock, pop rock, experimental
- Years active: 2006–present
- Label: Star Apple Kingdom
- Members: Robert Harrison; Josh Gravelin; Hollie Thomas; Kullen Fuchs; Darin Murphy

Future Clouds and Radar is an American rock group from Austin, Texas. It was founded by Robert Harrison after the dissolution of his previous group, Cotton Mather, and features several of the same musicians.

== History ==
Following the commercial failure of The Big Picture, Cotton Mather quietly ended in 2003. Harrison stepped away from the music world for some time to focus on raising his family. When he returned to making music in 2006, he assembled a collective of musicians and set about "creating music that couldn't be boxed in". Although the music was recorded by a vast array of musicians with Harrison as the only constant member, he still chose to present it as a band to emphasize the contributions of the other musicians.

The first release from the group, and the first release on Harrison's Star Apple Kingdom label, was an eponymous double album, released in 2007. Future Clouds And Radar was much more experimental and varied than the work of Cotton Mather, incorporating genres as wide-ranging as reggae, psychedelia, avant-garde, and ambient music in addition to pop and rock. The following year, the group released a second album, Peoria, which continued in the same musical vein. Also in 2008, a single-disc distillation of the debut album was released in the UK, removing eleven tracks and adding three otherwise unavailable acoustic performances.

The group never officially disbanded, and occasionally still plays around Austin, but have not released anything since 2009. Although Harrison's now-defunct blog stated that the "Songs from the I Ching" project would feature music from both of his projects, everything that has been released as of 2019 has been credited to Cotton Mather.

== Videos ==
Nickelodeon animator Keith Graves was chosen to create a video of the song "Dr. No." Other videos include:

- Holy Janet Comes on Waves
- Back Seat Silver Jet Sighter
- This Is Really A Book
- Build Havana
- Hurricane Judy
- The Epcot View

== Reception ==
Austinist described the group as "Beatles-esque psychedelia", while The New Yorker described the music as "sprawling orchestral art rock." NPR wrote ""Audacious? Sure. But undeniably impressive." Texas public radio station KUT listed it among the best albums of the year 2007, while Pop Narcotic listed it in its top 10 of the year.

- "It's up for debate whether Austin-based Robert Harrison's double-disc debut is pure genius with blind ambition, or the product of an excess of ideas. In any case, his band Future Clouds and Radar certainly knows how to entertain. The self-titled album crosses a dozen different styles and gets handed numerous genre-definers, all of which include the word "art" as a prefix. Future Clouds and Radar would seem to be inspired by The Flaming Lips or Guided By Voices, whose prolificacy Harrison emulates." (NPR).
- "A triumph of schizophrenic musical vision ... a beautiful and brilliant mess ... magnificent double disc collection of pop gems – 4 stars." (Paste Magazine).
- "Whether FC&R is essaying dreamy, electronicaized psychedelia, blue-eyed soul anthemry, Latin-flecked jangle-pop, or full-guns a-blazing, fuzzed-out garage, the material is executed with a jazzlike precision and suffused with a deeply emotional, spontaneous vibe. Winner 2007's Debut Artist of the Year" (Harp Magazine). Harp placed Future Clouds and Radar as number 4 on its list of top 50 CDs of 2007.

== Discography ==
=== Future Clouds and Radar ===
- Released: April 2007
- Label: Star Apple Kingdom

==== Disc 1 ====
1. Birds Of Prey
2. Let Me Get Your Coat
3. Hurricane Judy
4. Drugstore Bust
5. This Is Really A Book
6. You Will Be Loved
7. Quicksilver
8. Where's My Drink?
9. Holy Janet Comes On Waves
10. Wake Up And Live
11. Our Time
12. Green Mountain Clover
13. Devil No More

==== Disc 2 ====
1. Quicksilver 2
2. Get Your Boots On
3. Build Havana
4. Dr. No
5. Back Seat Silver Jet Sighter
6. Malice of Stars
7. The Great Escape
8. Letters To Junius
9. Altitude
10. Cowboy Weather
11. Armitage Shanks
12. Christmas Day 1923
13. Wake
14. Safety Zone

==== UK single-CD edition ====
1. Birds Of Prey
2. Let Me Get Your Coat
3. Hurricane Judy
4. Drugstore Bust
5. This Is Really A Book
6. You Will Be Loved
7. Quicksilver
8. Get Your Boots On
9. Build Havana
10. Dr. No
11. Back Seat Silver Jet Sighter
12. Malice Of Stars
13. Altitude
14. Cowboy Weather
15. Safety Zone
16. Green Mountain Clover
17. Holy Janet Comes On Waves (Acoustic)
18. Quicksilver (Acoustic)
19. Let Me Get Your Coat (Acoustic)

=== Peoria ===
- Released: Oct 2008
- Label: Star Apple Kingdom
1. The Epcot View
2. Old Edmund Ruffin
3. Feet On Grass
4. Mummified
5. 18 Months
6. The Mortal
7. Mortal 926
8. Follow The Crane
