= Griz discography =

GRiZ discography
- Studio albums: 8
- EPs: 10
- Singles: 63
- Mixtapes: 8

Grant Richard Kwiecinski, also known by his stage name GRiZ, an American DJ, songwriter, and electronic producer from Southfield Michigan. He is known for playing the saxophone along with producing funk, electro-soul, and self-described future-funk.

== Albums ==
=== Studio albums ===
| Title | Album details | Chart positions | | Track lists |
| Title | Album details | US | US Dance | Track lists |
|---|---|---|---|---|
| End of the World Party | Released: June 28, 2011; Label: Daly City Records | — | — | Track list: 1. Wax City; 2. Triumph Proper; 3. Grizzlor; 4. Chasin Galaxies; 5. Dance With Me; 6. Trille; 7. Adventure is Out There; 8. Busta; 9. Illphonics; 10. Up in Smoke; 11. Outro: Fred Calls |
| Mad Liberation | Released: September 4, 2012; Label: All Good Records | — | — | Track list: 1. Too Young for Tragedy; 2. Smash the Funk; 3. Rock n Roll; 4. Blastaa; 5. Live on Arrival; 6. Where's the Love; 7. Mr. B 8. Fall in Love Too Fast; 9. Better Than I’ve Ever Been (Note: A demo of "Better Than I’ve Ever Been" was released on July 8, 2011.); 10. Wonder Why; 11. The Future is Now; 12. See You Again |
| Rebel Era | Release date: October 15, 2013; Label: Liberated Music | — | — | Track list: 1. Gettin’ Live; 2. Hard Times; 3. Feel the Love; 4. DTW to DIA (The Travels of Mr. B); 5. Simple; 6. Dance With Me; 7. Do My Thang; 8. Too Young for Tragedy (Part 2); 9. Crime in the City; 10. Keep the Dream Alive; 11. How it Ends |
| Say it Loud | Release date: March 30, 2015; Label: All Good Records | — (Note: Say it Loud did not enter the Billboard 200 chart, but peaked at #15 on the Heatseekers Albums chart.) | 9 | Track list: 1. The Anthem; 2. Funk Party; 3. Get Down; 4. Need This; 5. It's All Good; 6. A Fine Way to Die; 7. For the Love; 8. Stop Trippin’; 9. Headspace (Time is on Our Side); 10. Turnin’; 11. Take it High |
| Good Will Prevail | Released: September 23, 2016; Label: All Good Records | 169 | 2 | Track list: 1. Wicked; 2. Can't Hold Me Down; 3. My Friends and I 4. I Don't Mind; 5. Good Times Roll; 6. Feelin’ Fine; 7. PS GFY; 8. What We’ve Become; 9. If There Ever Comes a Day; 10. Rather Be Free; 11. Gotta Push On; 12. Before I Go; 13. Driftin’ |
| Ride Waves | Released: April 5, 2019; Label: Self-released | 199 | 2 | Track list: 1. Can't Get Enough; 2. I'm Good; 3. My Friends and I (Part 2); 4. Cruise Control; 5. A New Day; 6. The Prayer; 7. It Gets Better; 8. Bustin’ Out; 9. Caught Up; 10. Maybe; 11. The Escape; 12. Mercy; 13. Barrel of a Gun; 14. Find My Own Way |
| Rainbow Brain | Released: July 23, 2021; Label: Self-released | — (Note: Rainbow Brain did not enter the Billboard 200 chart, but peaked at #13 on the Heatseekers Albums chart.) | 9 | Track list: 1. c h r o m e s t h e s i a 2. Astro Funk; 3. Vibe Check; 4. t a k e - e m - b a c k 5. Burn Up the Floor; 6. g o t - i t - l i k e 7. Tie-Dye Sky; 8. R O Y G B i V 9. Rainbow Brain; 10. 2 4; 11. Harmony; 12. Gold; 13. Daily Routine; 14. Other Side of Jupiter; 15. w u - w e i 16. Infinite; 17. y o u - a r e . i - c a n 18. Feel it All; 19. 4 2; 20. 548 MAC ave 21. p . s .; 22. Another World; 23. The Echo Tree |
| Future Funk: Volume 1 | Released: June 5, 2026; Label: Self-released | — | — | Track list: 1. Outlaw; 2. Rump Shaker; 3. Rainbow Machine; 4. BBFL; 5. Funk You Up!; 6. Found Your Love; 7. When I'm Hot; 8. iLLest in the Game; 9. 555; 10. Back to Me |
"—" denotes a recording that did not chart or was not released in that territory.

=== Mixtapes ===
| Title | Release date | Track lists |
|---|---|---|
| Little Learners (as GK) | October 30, 2010 | Track list: 1. Shine Like Diamonds; 2. Bang Bang; 3. Robotnic; 4. On the Move; 5. Feelin Brand New; 6. Sleeping Under the Same Stars; 7. Curtains Up; 8. Jellyfish |
| Chasing the Golden Hour (Part 1) | September 2, 2015 | Track list: 1. Love Will Follow You; 2. Summer ‘97; 3. It’s Over (but it’s just begun); 4. Cabin Sessions; 5. Blue Vervain; 6. Feelin’ High; 7. Sexier Than Austin Powers; 8. Sometimes the Truth Don't Rhyme; 9. The Moment Seizes Us |
| Chasing the Golden Hour (Part 2) | September 7, 2017 | Track list: 1. I’ve Been Dreamin; 2. Akhet's Theme; 3. Feel Like Makin' Love; 4. Smoke That; 5. In the Sunshine; 6. Wave Killers; 7. LEVEL 2; 8. LEVEL 3; 9. You Are My; 10. Come Too Far |
| Chasing the Golden Hour (Part 3) | September 17, 2020 | Track list: 1. Know Time Like the Present; 2. Gettin High, Havin Fun; 3. Won't Be Gone Long; 4. Solo; 5. Nights in Shibuya; 6. Koh Samui; 7. Wish; 8. Sweet; 9. Floating; 10. Where Will I Go |
| Chasing the Golden Hour (Part 4) | September 23, 2022 | Track list: 1. Mystik Dub; 2. Your Light; 3. Keep Bouncin'; 4. Airplane Mode; 5. Carry On; 6. Gooey; 7. On a High; 8. 4 Your Mind; 9. Sundown |
| Side Quest: Vol. 1 | June 17, 2025 | Track list: Track list |
| Future Funk Radio: Vol. 1 | July 24, 2026 | Track list: Track list |
| Chasing the Golden Hour (Part 5) | To be announced | Confirmed tracks: All I Need |

=== Extended plays ===
| Title | Release date | Track lists |
|---|---|---|
| Bangers[1].Zip | June 24, 2019 | Track list: 1. Voodoo; 2. No Bad Trips; 3. Ice Cream |
| Bangers[2].Zip | August 14, 2019 | Track list: 1. Griztronics; 2. Freak the Method; 3. Push the Vibe |
| Bangers[3].Zip | September 20, 2019 | Track list: 1. I Like That; 2. supadupakulavibe 3. Now Til Infinity |
| Bangers[4].Zip | November 15, 2019 | Track list: 1. Gonna Get Funky; 2. Let's Get Weird; 3. Tiger Kingdom Space Camp |
| Bangers[5].Zip | May 8, 2020 | Track list: 1. The Baddest; 2. My Friends and I (Part 3); 3. Spaceship Ride |
| Bangers[6].Zip | October 16, 2020 | Track list: 1. No Doubt; 2. Juicy; 3. Brain Fuzz |
| Bangers[7].Zip | November 11, 2022 | Track list: 1. Skydive; 2. Laser Fire; 3. MEGAZORD |
| Ouroboros | October 6, 2023 | Track list: 1. t a k e c a r e 2. Drop In; 3. In This World (Note: A demo of "In This World" was released on November 17, 2022 under the title, "Is There Any Love".); 4. f a d i n g 5. Falling Flying; 6. f u n k i s h 7. Knucklepuck; 8. Better From Here |
| GEMiNI | March 21, 2025 | Track list: 1. Found Your Love; 2. Take Me Home; 3. 2-step Nassau; 4. Til the Color Fades |
| Flip Service: Volume 1 (with Wooli) | November 19, 2026 | Track list: 1. Feelin Good; 2. Get Your Freak On; 3. A Weapon Apart; 4. What Tomorrow Will Bring |

=== Live albums ===
| Title | Release date |
|---|---|
| Live from Space Camp (Night 1) | June 1, 2022 |
| Live from Space Camp (Night 2) | June 1, 2022 |
| Chasing the Golden Hour: Live at Bonnaroo 2023 | June 28, 2023 |

=== Remix albums ===
| Title | Release date |
|---|---|
| TeaMWork (with BeatLoaf) | May 30, 2011 |
| For the Love (Remixes) | August 25, 2015 |
| Good Will Continue (Remixes) | August 18, 2017 |
| Medusa (Remixes) | October 30, 2020 |

=== Compilations ===
| Title | Release date |
|---|---|
| ID Bible (1) | September 20, 2023 |

== Singles ==
=== As lead artist ===
| Title | Year | Peak chart positions | Album |
| Title | Year | US Dance/ Elec. | Album |
|---|---|---|---|
| "Where’s the Love" | 2011 | — | Mad Liberation |
| "You Got to Change" | 2012 | — | Non-album single |
| "The Future is Now" | 2012 | — | Mad Liberation |
| "Smash the Funk" | 2012 | — | Mad Liberation |
| "Digital Liberation is Mad Freedom" (with Gramatik as Grizmatik) | 2012 | — | Non-album singles |
| "Power" (with Big Gigantic) | 2012 | — | Non-album singles |
| "My People" (with Gramatik as Grizmatik) | 2013 | — | Non-album singles |
| "Gettin' Live" | 2013 | — | Rebel Era |
| "Hard Times" | 2013 | — | Rebel Era |
| "A Fine Way to Die" (featuring Orlando Napier) | 2014 | — | Say it Loud |
| "Stop Trippin’" (featuring iDA HAWK) | 2015 | — | Say it Loud |
| "The Anthem" (featuring Mike Avery) | 2015 | — | Say it Loud |
| "Funk Party" | 2015 | — | Say it Loud |
| "For the Love" (featuring Talib Kweli) | 2015 | — | Say it Loud |
| "Summer ‘97" (featuring Muzzy Bearr) | 2015 | — | Chasing the Golden Hour (Part 1) |
| "Good Times Roll" (with Big Gigantic) | 2015 | — | Good Will Prevail |
| "Feelin’ High" (featuring Eric Bloom) | 2015 | — | Chasing the Golden Hour (Part 1) |
| "Before I Go" (featuring Leo Napier) | 2016 | — | Good Will Prevail |
| "Can’t Hold Me Down" (featuring Tash Neal) | 2016 | — (Note: "Can’t Hold Me Down" did not enter the Hot Dance/Electronic Songs chart, but peaked at #13 on the Dance Digital Song Sales chart.) | Good Will Prevail |
| "PS GFY" (featuring Cherub) | 2016 | — | Good Will Prevail |
| "Gotta Push On" (featuring Brasstracks and Eric Krasno) | 2016 | — | Good Will Prevail |
| "As We Proceed" (with Gramatik as GRiZMATiK) | 2017 | — | Non-album single |
| "Feel Like Makin’ Love" (featuring The Cabin) | 2017 | — | Chasing the Golden Hour (Part 2) |
| "Smoke That" (featuring ProbCause and Jaye Prime) | 2017 | — | Chasing the Golden Hour (Part 2) |
| "It Gets Better" (featuring DRAM) | 2018 | — | Ride Waves |
| "Can’t Get Enough" | 2018 | — | Ride Waves |
| "I’m Good" | 2019 | — | Ride Waves |
| "A New Day" (featuring Matisyahu) | 2019 | — | Ride Waves |
| "Find My Own Way" (featuring Wiz Khalifa) | 2019 | — | Ride Waves |
| "Supa Fly" (with Boogie T) | 2019 | — | Non-album singles |
| "Could U" | 2020 | — | Non-album singles |
| "Solo" (featuring ProbCause) | 2020 | — | Chasing the Golden Hour (Part 3) |
| "Medusa" (with Wreckno) | 2020 | 42 | Non-album single |
| "No Doubt" (with Jauz) | 2020 | — | Bangers[6].Zip |
| "Vibe Check" | 2021 | 46 | Rainbow Brain |
| "Ease Your Mind" (with Ganja White Night) | 2021 | — | Non-album singles |
| "Bring Me Back" (with Elohim) | 2021 | — | Non-album singles |
| "Astro Funk" | 2021 | 32 | Rainbow Brain |
| "Tie-Dye Sky" | 2021 | — | Rainbow Brain |
| "Rainbow Brain" (featuring ProbCause and Chrishira Perrier) | 2021 | 49 | Rainbow Brain |
| "Griztronics II (Another Level)" (with Subtronics) | 2021 | 26 | FRACTALS |
| "Color of Your Soul" (with CloZee) | 2022 | 29 | Non-album single |
| "Open Your Mind" (with Big Gigantic) | 2022 | — | Brighter Future 2 |
| "Feel No Pain" | 2022 | — | Non-album single |
| "Bass Music" (with TVBOO) | 2022 | — | Blue Collar Bass |
| "Volume" (with The Sponges) | 2022 | — | Non-album singles |
| "FUNKONAUT" (with LSDREAM) | 2022 | 48 | Non-album singles |
| "Your Light" | 2022 | — | Chasing the Golden Hour (Part 4) |
| "On a High" | 2022 | — | Chasing the Golden Hour (Part 4) |
| "Skydive" (featuring ProbCause and Chrishira Perrier) | 2022 | — | Bangers[7].Zip |
| "Ecstasy of Soul" (with Zeds Dead) | 2022 | 19 | Non-album singles |
| "SAXORiDDiM" | 2023 | — | Non-album singles |
| "Chaos Theory" (with Wooli) | 2025 | — | Non-album singles |
| "Coast 2 Coast" (featuring Flowdan) | 2025 | — | Non-album singles |
| "Deep Clear Water" (with Gryffin) | 2025 | 23 | Non-album singles |
| "Funk You Up!" | 2025 | — | Future Funk: Volume 1 |
| "Light You Up" (with Tape B featuring CREG) | 2025 | — | Non-album singles |
| "Nobody Else" (with Kaleena Zanders) | 2025 | — | Non-album singles |
| "555" | 2025 | — | Future Funk: Volume 1 |
| "Pop Off" (with Levity) | 2026 | — | Non-album single |
| "All I Need" | 2026 | — | Chasing the Golden Hour (Part 5) |
| "BBFL" | 2026 | — | Future Funk: Volume 1 |
| "Sunshine" | 2026 | — | Non-album single |
"—" denotes a recording that did not chart or was not released in that territory

=== As featured artist ===
| Title | Year | Album |
|---|---|---|
| "Life Goes On" (Manic Focus featuring GRiZ) | 2014 | Cerebral Eclipse |
| "Odyssey" (SunSquabi featuring GRiZ) | 2016 | Odyssey |
| "C’mon" (Big Gigantic featuring GRiZ) | 2016 | Brighter Future |
| "OFF IN THE DISCO" (SHOOKA featuring GRiZ as THE SHiZ) | 2019 | Non-album single |

=== Other charted songs ===
| Title | Year | Peak chart positions | Album |
| Title | Year | US Dance/ Elec. | Album |
|---|---|---|---|
| "Griztronics" (with Subtronics) | 2019 | 9 | Bangers[2].Zip |
| "Gonna Get Funky" | 2019 | — (Note: "Gonna Get Funky" did not enter the Hot Dance/Electronic Songs chart, but peaked at #25 on the Dance Digital Song Sales chart.) | Bangers[4].Zip |
| "Burn Up the Floor" (with Jantsen) | 2021 | 25 | Rainbow Brain |
| "In This World" | 2023 | 47 | Ouroboros |

== Guest appearances ==
| Title | Year | Album |
|---|---|---|
| "Taz-Bandana" | 2011 | Bass From Above |
| "Vision of Happiness" | 2011 | Bass From Above: Vol. 2 |
| "Pretty Boy" (with Stephan Jacobs) | 2011 | Mad Era |
| "Yesterday’s Dream" | 2011 | Trip$tep: Vol. 1 |
| "I’m Home" | 2011 | Acid Crunk: Vol. 4 |
| "Bougie" (Muzzy Bearr featuring GRiZ) | 2015 | Vintage Sultra |
| "Rewind" (Flint Eastwood featuring GRiZ) | 2017 | Broke Royalty |

== Production credits ==
| Title | Year | Artist(s) | Album |
|---|---|---|---|
| "White Lies" | 2017 | ProbCause featuring Chris Karns | Distractions |
| "LOVE GUN 101" | 2019 | SUPERLOVE | Non-album singles |
| "Good Aim" | 2024 | VIBELINE | Non-album singles |

== Remixes ==
| Title | Original artist(s) | Year | Album |
|---|---|---|---|
| "Slap Me" | Kill Paris | 2013 | To a New Earth |
| "Vibe Vendetta" | Pretty Lights | 2013 | A Color Map of the Sun (Remixes) |
| "Audible Edibles" | Freddy Todd | 2017 | Non-album single |
| "These Days" | Rudimental featuring Jess Glynne, Macklemore, and Dan Caplen | 2018 | These Days (Remixes) |
| "Medusa" | GRiZ and Wreckno | 2020 | Medusa (Remixes) |
| "GRiZTRONICS II (Another Level)" (VIP) | GRiZ and Subtronics | 2022 | ANTIFRACTALS |
| "Where You Are" | John Summit and HAYLA | 2023 | Non-album single |
| "It's Called: Freefall" | Rainbow Kitten Surprise | 2026 | ID Bible (1) |
| "DON'T BELIEVE IT" | John Summit and Absolutely | 2026 | DON'T BELIEVE IT (Remixes) |
