= Suwannee Hulaween =

Music festival

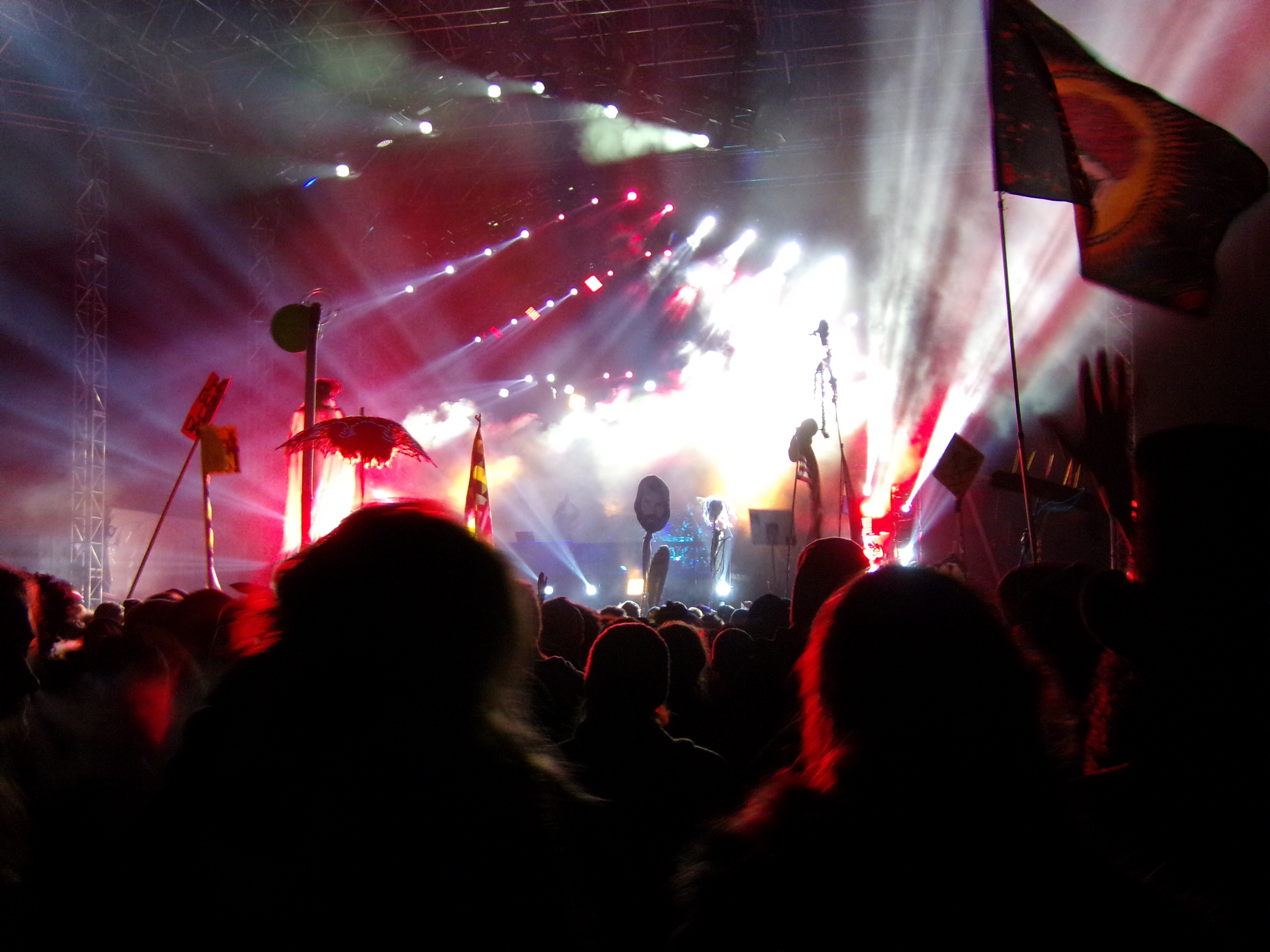
- Genre: Jam; Electronic; Indie; Rock; Hip-Hop; Urban; EDM
- Dates: Last weekend of October or first weekend of November
- Location: Live Oak, Florida
- Years active: 2013–19, 2021-present
- Attendance: 4,000 (2013) 8,000 (2014) 21,000 (2015 sold out) 20,000 (2016 sold out) 20,000 (2017 sold out) 20,000 (2018 sold out) 17,500 (2019) 20,000 (2021 sold out) 20,000 (2022 sold out): Attendance is measured in ticket sales. Several thousand additional people attend the festival each year as part of the production crew and vendors
- Capacity: 20,000
- Organiser: Silver Wrapper and Purple Hat Productions
- Website: Official website

Suwannee Hulaween is an annual music and camping festival held over Halloween weekend at the Spirit of the Suwannee Music Park in Live Oak, Florida.

== Overview ==
The festival, hosted by The String Cheese Incident, was originally produced by Silver Wrapper and Purple Hat Productions. In 2019 it was purchased by Etix. The festival is held outdoors on five to seven stages and allows the attendees to camp onsite for the weekend at the Spirit of the Suwannee Music Park campground. Attendees are encouraged to dress in costumes befitting a Halloween dance party. The Main Stage is where The String Cheese Incident plays three sets each evening and is then followed by other headlining bands. The Amphitheater has a stage to accommodate additional headliners. The Patch is an additional stage the size of the Amphitheater. Spirit Lake is home to the art installation and a silent disco. The Campground Stage accommodates local, less well-known bands. Each year approximately 100 artists perform.

In 2014, Suwannee Hulaween added a day to the festival to become a four-day long festival. If Halloween (October 31) falls on a Thursday, Friday, Saturday, or Sunday of that year, Suwannee Hulaween is held during those four days. Otherwise it is held the weekend before.

The 2018 festival featured the world's first virtual reality music stage that allowed attendees to interactively explore the relationship between music and sound.

Suwannee Hulaween 2019 was confirmed in May 2019 and it headlined The String Cheese Incident, Bassnectar, Anderson Paak and The Free Nationals, and Jason Isbell and The 400 Unit. The festival took place the weekend before Halloween (10/24/19-10/27/19), and the theme was the 1990s.

== Line-up by year ==
=== 2013 ===
The 2013 festival was held on October 31 through November 2 and had a voodoo as a theme. The bands featured were The String Cheese Incident (three nights), STS9 (late night), Big Gigantic (late night), Emancipator, Conspirator, Steve Kimock & Friends, Suwannee Bluegrass Surprise, Brock Butler, Future Rock, Moon Taxi, Van Ghost, Jennifer Hartswick, and Applebutter Express.

=== 2014 ===
The 2014 festival was held on October 31 through November 2 and had the afterlife as a theme. The bands featured were The String Cheese Incident (three nights), Thievery Corporation, Big Gigantic, Beats Antique, The New Deal, Shpongle (Simon Posford DJ set), Joe Russo's Almost Dead, Emancipator, Greensky Bluegrass, The Dean Ween Group, EOTO, Keller Williams & Friends, Conspirator, Future Rock, Suwannee Bluegrass Surprise, Nahko and Medicine for the People, Rising Appalachia, Rob Garza (DJ set), Kung Fu, The Soul Rebels, Judah and the Lion, Van Ghost, The Heavy Pets, Ghost Owl (band)|Ghost Owl featuring Perpetual Groove members Albert Matt and Adam, Greenhouse Lounge, Cope, Strung Like A Horse, Jonathan Scales Fourchestra, Shane Pruitt Band, Suenalo, Dustin Thomas, Billy Gilmore's Jam, Grandpa's Cough Medicine Beartoe and Post Pluto.

The Thursday night pre-party was introduced in 2014. The bands featured at the pre-party were Electron (featuring Marc and Aaron of Conspirator and The Disco Biscuits, Mike Greenfield from Lotus, and Brothers Past guitarist Tommy Hamilton), as well as Particle, Yo Mama's Big Fat Booty Band, MZG, and Modern Measure.

The silent disco performances included Thibault, Vlad the Inhaler, MZG, Uprise, Ployd, Lumagrove, Taylor Shockley, Rocks 'N' Blunts, David Preston, LAVA, Beat Thief Inc, and Marc Freccaro.

=== 2015 ===
The 2015 festival was held on October 30 through November 1 and had a 1970s ghoul train theme. The bands featured were The String Cheese Incident (three nights), Pretty Lights, Primus, Chance the Rapper & Social Experiment, STS9, ODESZA, Slightly Stoopid, GRiZ, Lettuce, Railroad Earth, Papadosio, The Floozies, The Polish Ambassador, Sam Bush Band, The New Mastersounds, Manic Science (Manic Focus x Break Science), Future Rock, Michal Menert, Dopapod, Goldfish, Elephant Revival, The Nth Power, TAUK, Stick Figure, Little Hurricane, Earphunk, Sister Sparrow and the Dirtybirds, Big Wild, Turbo Suit, The Heavy Pets, Shook Twins, Greenhouse Lounge, Thomas Wynn & The Believers, The Heard, Modern Measure, Jon Stickley Trio, Catfish Alliance, Post Pluto, Master Radical, Great Peacock, Billy Gilmore & Friends, The Hip Abduction, Beebs & Her Money Makers, Come Back Alice, Displace, Juke, Sqeedlepuss, The Groove Orient, S.P.O.R.E., Flat Land, Bath Salt Zombies, Morning Fatty, and Holey Miss Moley.

The Thursday night pre-party featured the bands Joe Russo's Almost Dead, Dumpstaphunk, Eoto, Herd of Watts, and Leisure Chief.

=== 2016 ===
The 2016 festival was held on October 28 through the 30th and had an 1980s stringier things theme. The bands featured were The String Cheese Incident (three nights), My Morning Jacket, Disclosure (DJ set), Logic, Umphrey's McGee, STS9, Big Gigantic (featuring The Motet), Rebelution, The Claypool Lennon Delirium, Gramatik, Greensky Bluegrass, Lettuce, Boys Noize, Anderson .Paak & The Free National, Snarky Puppy, RÜFÜS DU SOL, Bob Moses, Slow Magic, The Revivalists, Karl Denson's Tiny Universe, Future Rock, Manic Focus, ILLENIUM, The Motet, Washed Out, Unlike Pluto, Come Back Alice, Savi Fernandez Band, El Dub, Ajeva, Post Pluto, and Savants of Soul.

The Thursday night pre-party featured the bands Umphrey's Mcgee, Greensky Bluegrass, EOTO & Friends, Kyle Hollingsworth Band, Marco Benevento, Fruition, The Werks, Ganja White Night, Late Night Radio, The Heavy Pets, Con Brio, Flamingosis, Imagined Herbal Flows, Grant Farm, Broccoli Samurai, Trae Pierce & The T-Stones, Unlimited Aspect, and Future Vintage.

The silent disco performances included Marvel Years, Artifakts, Prophet Massive, Vlad The Inhaler, Wyllys, Willie Evans Jr., Lusid, Digital Sykline, Brox, Cry Havoc, Lady Miaou, Austen Van Der Bleek, Lava, Rocks 'N' Blunts, Ployd, Walley Meskel, Aurakull, and Booty Boo.

2016 was the first year that the event venue capped on the number of tickets sold. The cap was 20,000 tickets.

=== 2017 ===
The 2017 festival was held on October 27 through October 29 and had a night of the loving dead theme. The bands featured were The String Cheese Incident (three nights), Damian "Jr. Gong" Marley, Bassnectar, Ween, GRiZ, Run The Jewels, Nick Murphy (Chet Faker), RL Grime, Portugal. The Man, Nathaniel Rateliff & The Night Sweats, Space Jesus, The Disco Biscuits, Claude Vonstroke, Vince Staples, Greensky Bluegrass, Lettuce, Beats Antique, Kamasi Washington, Moon Taxi, Charles Bradley & His Extraordinaires, Manic Focus, Spafford, TAUK, Dumpstaphunk, and Marco Benevento.

The Thursday night pre-party featured the bands Umphrey's McGee, Joe Russo's Almost Dead, Greensky Bluegrass, Liquid Stranger, The Devil Makes Three, Lettuce, EOTO & Friends, Spafford, Zach Deputy, Kyle Hollingsworth Band, Elohim, Protohype, Buku, The Nth Power, Southern Avenue, Great Peacock, Custard Pie, Ecology, The Getbye.

The theme for 2017 was special. Suwannee Hulaween' theme announcement said:

"In a world devilishly assaulted by ferocious natural disasters, crazed political discourse, and other sinister attacks, love is the only kryptonite that can stop these invaders in their tracks. Bust out your zombie garb, your cupid diaper or whatever else suits your Halloween desires. The only requirement is that you inject whatever you wear with a ghoulish portion of LOVE. In 2017, love is the answer, love wins."

On October 16, 2017, Suwannee Hulaween announced that all weekend tickets had been sold (20,000 tickets).

This was the first year that Suwannee Hulaween used RFID chipped wristbands.

=== 2018 ===
The 2018 festival was held October 26 through October 28 had a creatures of the galaxy theme. The bands featured were the String Cheese Incident (three nights), Odesza, Jamiroquai, Janelle Monáe, Tipper, The Revivalists, Vulfpeck, STS9, Rezz, Gramatik, NGHTMRE, Lettuce, Stephen Marley, Opiou, Manic focus, Trevor Hall, OTT, Clozee, Sunsquabi, Jade cicada, Bleep Bloop, Roosevelt Collier Band, the Wood Brothers, Emancipator Ensemble, and more.

The Thursday night pre-party featured the bands Joe Russo's Almost Dead(2x), STS9 (2x) including axe the cable, Lettuce, The Infamous String Dusters, The Floozies, Papadosio, EOTO & friends, Minnesota, Kyle Hollingsworth Band, Rayland Baxter, Ghost Light, Cory Wong, Psymbionic, Marco Benevento, The Broadcast, CBDB, Kaleigh Baker, Ajeva, locochino, Funk You, Honey Hound, Side Hustle, and Just Chameleons

=== 2019 ===
The 2019 festival was held October 24 through October 27 in Live Oak, Florida, at the Spirit of the Suwanee Music Park. The theme was 90's. The bands were The String Cheese Incident, Bassnectar, Anderson .Paak and the Free Nationals, Jason Isbell and the 400 Unit along with Big Wild, Flying Lotus, Greensky Bluegrass, Jai Wolf, Joe Russo's Almost Dead, Snails, STS9 x2, Tchami, Umphrey's McGee x2, Thundercat, Lettuce, Tom Morello, Steel Pulse, Pigeons Playing Ping Pong, Billy Strings, Whethan, Clozee, Manic Focus, G. Love & Special Sauce, Maribou State, EOTO, Ripe, Peekaboo, Whipped Cream, Charlesthefirst, Pnuma, The Motet, Circles Around the Sun, Walker & Royce, Star Kitchen, TAUK, Kyle Hollingsworth Band, Andy Frasco & The U.N., Magic City Hippies, The Hip Abduction, Sodown, Marvel Years, Spaga, J. Worra, Robert Walters 20th Congress, The Funk Hunters, MEMBA, Doom Flamingo, Brandon "Taz" Niederauer, Nobide, Vampa, Walden, Kaleigh Bakers Someday Honey, Shevonne, Bells and Robe, LPT, Tycho, Marc Rebillet, Mija, Justin Jay, Break Science Live Band, The Grass is Dead, Jon Stickley Trio, The Heavy Pets, Karina Rykman, Polyrhythmics, Erica Falls Band, MZG, Beebs and Her Money Makers, Jaden Carlson Band, Thomas Wynn & The Believers, Travers Brothership, Space Kadet, Shak Nasti, The Quickening, Electric Kif, The Difference, Firewater Tent Revival, Oklahoma Stackhouse, Ella Jet and Future Soul, Future Vintage, Danka, Sad Songs, Spiral Light, The Good Wood Band, Bears & Lions, Vlad the Inhaler, NickFresh, Charlie Hustle, Levitation Jones, Ployd, Hallucinate, Booty Boo, Hunter Reid, Dizzlephunk, Holly Woods, Kozmic, Austen van der Bleek, Clyde Avery, Combustible, Stephanie Laine, Notorious Conduct, Alberto Diaz, Cat Party and SIDETRAKD.

Wednesday evening October 23 featured Hula for a Cause, an optional concert held the evening before the festival starts. This annual event raises money for the Suwannee Spirit Kids Music Camp held several times each year free to students at the Music Park and also raises money for the Live Oak Music & Arts Foundation, which brings artists into area schools to share different genres of music with students.

Hulaween 2019 also featured its annual food drive program called Hula Helps The Hungry. The food drive was held during the festival and attendees brought non-perishable food items that were donated to Love INC.

The 2019 Suwannee Hulaween Music Festival had a record breaking attendance for both Suwannee Hulaween as well as the Spirit of the Suwannee Music Park 21,000 attendees.

=== 2020 ===
The 2020 Suwannee Hulaween music festival was canceled due to the COVID-19 global pandemic. Hulaween was originally scheduled for October 29 – November 1, 2020. Tickets never went on sale and a lineup was not announced. Suwannee Hulaween announced that plans are being made to continue the festival in 2021.

=== 2021 ===
The 2021 Suwannee Hulaween music festival was held October 28 through October 31 in Live Oak, Florida, at the Spirit of the Suwanee Music Park. The theme was Monster Mash. The bands were The String Cheese Incident, Skrillex, My Morning Jacket, Leon Bridges, Khruangbin, Zeds Dead, Joe Russo's Almost Dead, Greensky Bluegrass, Bonobo (DJ set), Chris Lake, Claude VonStroke, Cordae, EarthGang, Jungle, Lane 8, Lettuce, Lotus, Masego, Turkuaz, Dumpstaphunk, Durand Jones & the Indications, Eric Krasno & The Assembly, Evan Giia, Deathpact, Franc Moody, LP Giobbi, LSDream, Magic City Hippies, Mark Farina, Mersiv, Sierra Hull, SunSquabi, Surf Mesa, Manic Focus, The Floozies, Tank and the Bangas, Biicla, Break Science, Cautious Clay, The Nth Power, Daily Bread, Flipturn, Gg Magree, Honey Island Swamp Band, Jon Stickley Trio, KAMANI, Kyle Hollingsworth Band, lespecial, MZG, Nala, Funk You, Neal Francis, Roosevelt Collier Band, The Fritz, Wreckno, Anthill Cinema, Maggie Rose, Astro, Vlad The Inhaler, Celisse, Dr. Bacon, Grandpa Da Gambler, Greenhouse Lounge, Honey Hounds, The Grass is Dead, JGBCB, Joe Marcinek Band, Lamorn, Levitation Jones, Little Stranger, Magnolia Boulevard, Mize, Booty Boo, Nerf The World, Oxford Noland, Raquel Rodriguez, Revival, Rohan Solo, Shine and the Shakers, Someday Honey, S.P.O.R.E., Stick Martin & Jon Ditty, Tand, The Reality, Tire Fire, Veil B2B NotLö, and West End Blend.

=== 2022 ===
The 2022 Suwannee Hulaween music festival was held October 27 through October 30 in Live Oak, Florida, at the Spirit of the Suwanee Music Park. The theme was Suwannee Horror Disco Show. The bands were The String Cheese Incident, J.I.D, The Disco Biscuits, Clozee, Twiddle, Louis The Child, Fisher, Portugal. The Man, Joe Russo’s Almost Dead, Rainbow Kitten Surprise, Liquid Stranger (Wakaan takeover), Margo Price, Lettuce, Desert Hearts, STS9, Gigantic NGHTMRE, Fearless Flyers, Molly Tuttle & Golden Highway, Of The Trees, The Main Squeeze, Manic Focus (live band), Blaque Dynamite, Circles Around The Sun, Lawrence, Kyle Hollingsworth Band, Leftover Salmon, TOKiMONSTA, The Polish Ambassador, Two Feet, Guavatron, A Hundred Drum, Ajeva, American Grime, Anthill CInema, Artikal Sound System, Biotechnick, Butcher Brown featuring Nigel Hall, Caitlin Krisko & The Broadcast, Cannabliss, Cimafunk, Cory Wong, Cozm & Naught, Danielle Ponder, Dirtwire, Dogs In A Pile, Eazybaked, Eggy, Elohim, Eugene Snowden, Franc Moody, Future Joy, Gorgon City, Honeywhat, Isaiah Sharkey, Jantsen, Jauz (Off The Deep End set), Jiriki, Kaleena Zanders, Karina Rykman, KydKong, Lewis Del Mar, Little Bird, Liz Cooper, LP Giobbi (Femme House Takeover), LPT, Maddy O’Neal, Mark Lettieri Group, Miane, Mindchatter, MZG, Neighbor, Neil Frances, Niles, Opiuo, Paper Ido, Player Dave, Purple Gurl, Ravenscoon, Row Joma, Sexbruise?, Skiz, Soul Taxi, Straying Anchors, Sylvan Esso, Tand, Tape B, The Iceman Special, The Snozberries, The Tanglers, Three Star Revival, Toubab Krewe, Trevor Bystrom, Tripp St, Vlad the Inhaler, Wednesday Night Titans, Zingara

=== 2023 ===
Headliners: Big Wild, Channel Tres (DJ Set), DISPATCH, Elderbrook, Goose, Joe Russo's Almost Dead, John Summit, Colonel Les Claypool's Fearless Flying Frog Brigade, Mt. Joy, Pretty Lights, Rainbow Kitten Surprise, Smino, The Trey Anastasio Band, and The String Cheese Incident.

Alpha by tier: Altin Gün, Apashe, Blond:ish, Blu DeTiger, Boogie T, Champagne Drip, DOMi & JD Beck, EPROM, Gioli & Assia, INZO, ISOxo, Joshwa, Lab Group, Lettuce, Manic Focus, Memba, Moore Kismet, Pigeons Playing Ping Pong, SoDown, The Dip, Yung Bae, Bill & Jilian Nershi ft. Jason Hann, Eddie Roberts & The Lucky Strokes, Ghost Note, Jennifer Hartswick Band, Khiva, Kitchen Dwellers, Kyle Hollingsworth Band, lespecial, LUCATI, Marvel Years, Melt, MZG, NotLö, QRTR, Roosevelt Collier Band, The Nth Power Presents: Jenth Power, Trousdale, VEIL, Yam Yam, AK RENNY, Austen van der Bleek, AUSTERIA, Bad Snacks, Cadillac Jones, Canvas, Chachuba, CHYL, Cope, cosmic collective, Couch, Electric Kif, Empire Strikes Brass, EREZ, Erin & The Wildfire, Fernando Rosa, Free Range Strange, Funk You, GoldenEra, Jason Leech, Jon Stickley Trio, Kendall Street Company, María También, Matcha, MiniM, Ramona + the RIOT, Rohan Solo, Sailor Jane & The Apricators, Snakes & Stars, Sneezy, Steeln' Peaches: An Allman Brothers Revue, Stick & Ditty, Tand, The Jauntee, The Orange Constant, Tru Phonic, Underground Springhouse, Universal Funk Orchestra, VICKY B.

=== 2024 ===
Headliners: Black Pumas, CloZee, Sublime with Rome, Chris Lake, Tash Sultana, Tipper, Chase & Status, Greensky Bluegrass, Killer Mike, and Liquid Stranger, and The String Cheese Incident.

Alpha by tier: A Hundred Drums, Airrica, Ajeva, AK RENNY, Alleycvtt, Andy Frasco & The U.N., Brux, Bunt., Cassian, Cory Wong, Daily Bread, Davezilla, Dionysus, Dirtwire, DJ Brownie, Dumpstaphunk, Eater, Eggy, Elephantproof, G Jones, Guavatron, Holly Bowling, Honey Hounds, J. Worra, Karina Rykman, Kyle Walker, Lettuce, Levity, LP Giobbi, LVNY, Maddy O’Neal, Madwoman, Makua Rothman, Manic Focus, Mascolo, Mike Dillon and Punkadelick, Mldlife, Moontricks, Motifv, MZG, New MasterSounds, Nora En Pure, Of The Trees, Oppidan, Phyphr, Ravenscoon, Sam Grisman Project, Sauce Pocket, Say She She, Side Trak’d, Spafford, Tamayo, Tand, Tauk Moore, The Ain’t Sisters, The Bobby Weir Incident, The Headtones.
