= Governors Ball Music Festival =

Music festival in New York City, United States

- Status: Active
- Genre: Music festival
- Frequency: Annually
- Venue: Governors Island (2011); Randalls Island (2012–2019); Citi Field, Queens (2021–2022); Flushing Meadows–Corona Park, Queens (2023–present)
- Locations: New York City, United States
- Years active: 15
- Inaugurated: June 18, 2011
- Previous event: June 5–7, 2026
- Attendance: 150,000 (2015)
- Website: governorsballmusicfestival.com

The Governors Ball Music Festival (commonly known as Governors Ball or Gov Ball) is a multi-day music festival held in New York City, United States. Launched in 2011 by Jordan Wolowitz, Tom Russell, Yoni Reisman, the festival features a variety of genres and styles of music, including rock, electronic, hip-hop, indie, Americana, pop, and folk. It is produced by Founders Entertainment, a festival promotion company based in New York City, which also produced The Meadows Music & Arts Festival. Along with the music artists, the festival also features numerous New York-based restaurants and food trucks, as well as activities and games.

The festival is named for its original location, Governors Island, although only the 2011 event was held there. The festival therefore has no affiliation to any official with the title "governor".

== History ==
=== 2011 ===
The inaugural Governors Ball was held on June 18, 2011, at Governors Island in New York City. The one-day festival was headlined by Girl Talk, Pretty Lights, and Empire of the Sun. Governors Ball Music festival 2011 amassed the highest attendance of any event in Governors Island's history, outselling Dave Matthews Band Caravan and Bassnectar's Bass Island in 2011. Reviews for the 2011 festival were positive, with Flavorwire reporting, "As many area festival attempts often fall flat due to poor execution, the Governors Ball was a pleasant exception to the rule, leaving us looking forward to its return next year," and Gothamist reported, "A gorgeous day at Governors Island...everyone seemed to leave sunburned and happy."

=== 2012 ===
Governors Ball 2012, the second iteration of the festival, was held on June 23 and 24 at Randalls Island in New York City. Expanding to a two-day event, the festival featured more music artists in order to fill both days. It was headlined by Passion Pit, Kid Cudi, Chromeo, Modest Mouse, Beck, and Explosions in the Sky. Randalls Island was chosen as the new venue of the festival due to the event's growth. Food offerings at the 2012 event included Coolhaus ice cream, Luke's Lobster, Waffles & Dinges, Mexicue, Food Freaks, Philz Steaks, Ports Coffee, and Pie for the People. Activities at the event included lawn games such as cornhole, ladder golf, and croquet (sponsored by Zogsports), ping pong (sponsored by SPiN New York), and silent disco. Reviews of the 2012 festival were overwhelmingly positive.

=== 2013 ===
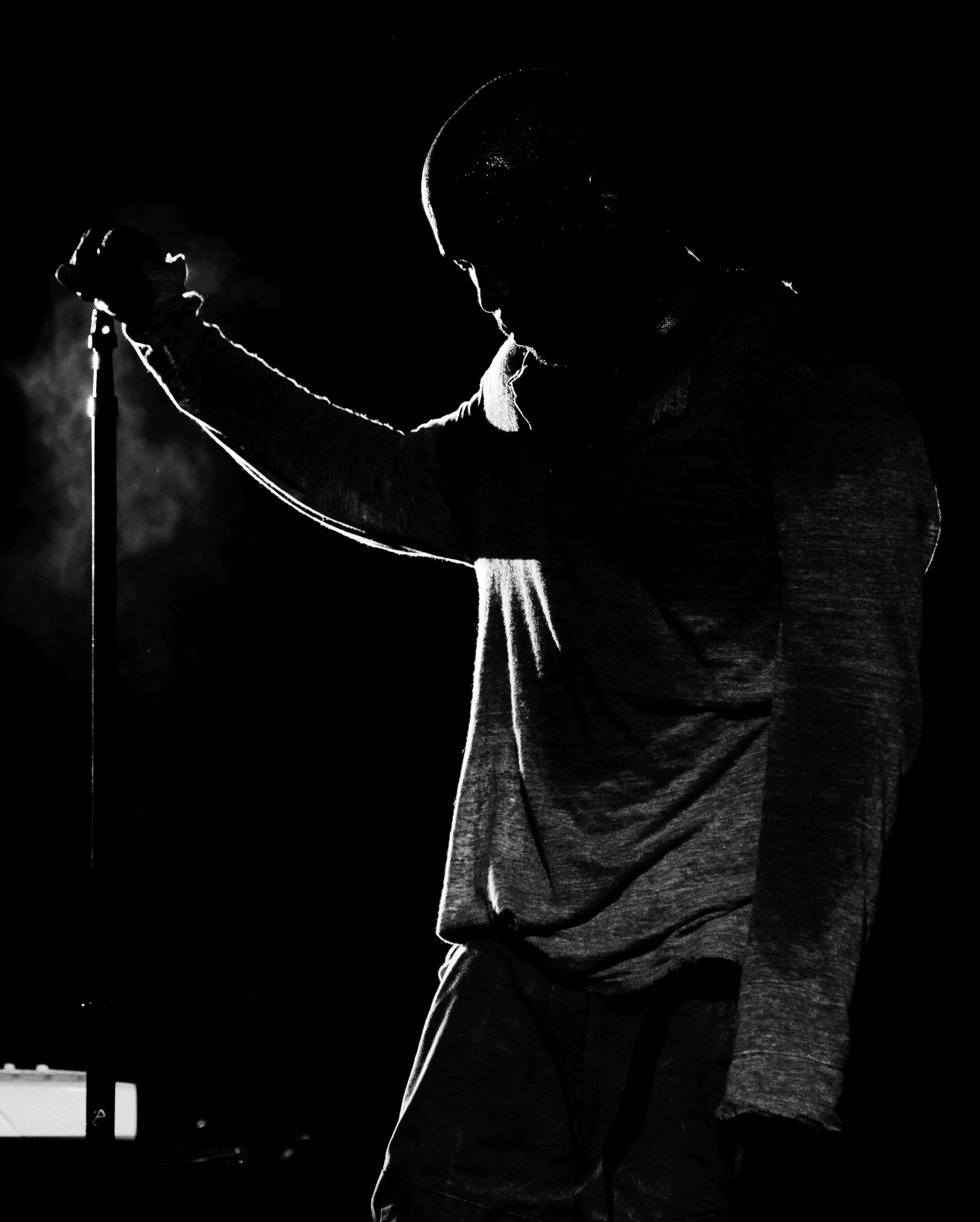
Kanye West headlined the festival in 2013.

Governors Ball 2013, the third iteration of the festival, was held on June 7 to 9 at Randalls Island. It was headlined by Kings of Leon, Guns N' Roses, and Kanye West.

It rained heavily on the opening day of the festival, which caused massive transportation delays to and from the island. The festival was also forced to shut down early on Friday evening due to weather-related safety concerns, and several shows were cancelled, including that of headliner Kings of Leon. Much of the festival grounds were mud by Saturday morning.

=== 2014 ===
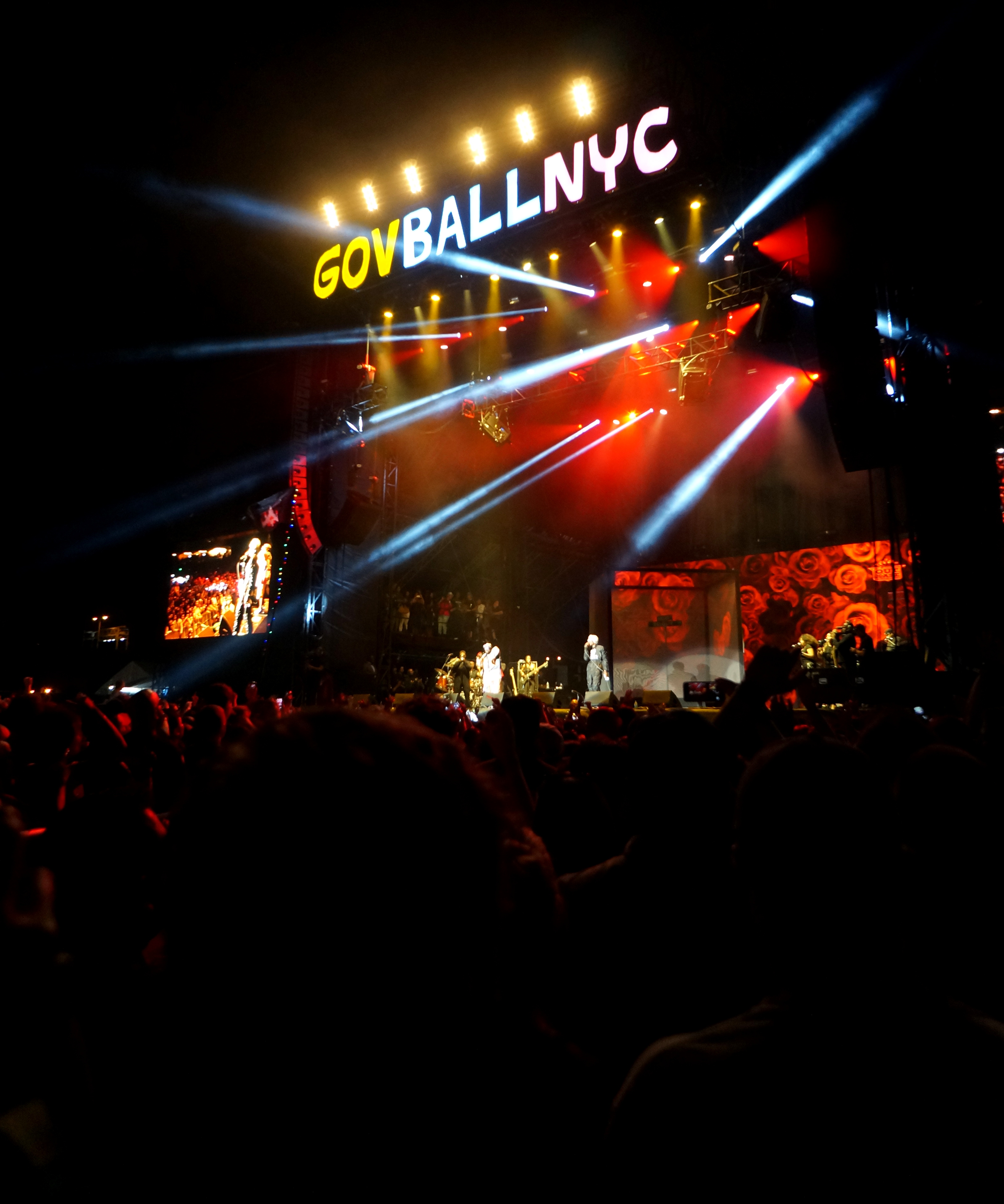
Outkast performing at the festival in 2014

Governors Ball 2014, the fourth iteration of the festival, was held on June 6 to 8 at Randalls Island. It was headlined by Outkast, Phoenix, TV on the Radio, Jack White, The Strokes, Skrillex, Vampire Weekend, and Axwell Λ Ingrosso.

=== 2015 ===
Governors Ball 2015, the fifth iteration of the festival, was held on June 5 to 7 at Randalls Island. It was headlined by Drake, The Black Keys, deadmau5, and Florence and the Machine. It rained during the second day, but, unlike previous years, the festival was not cancelled and continued despite delays.

=== 2016 ===
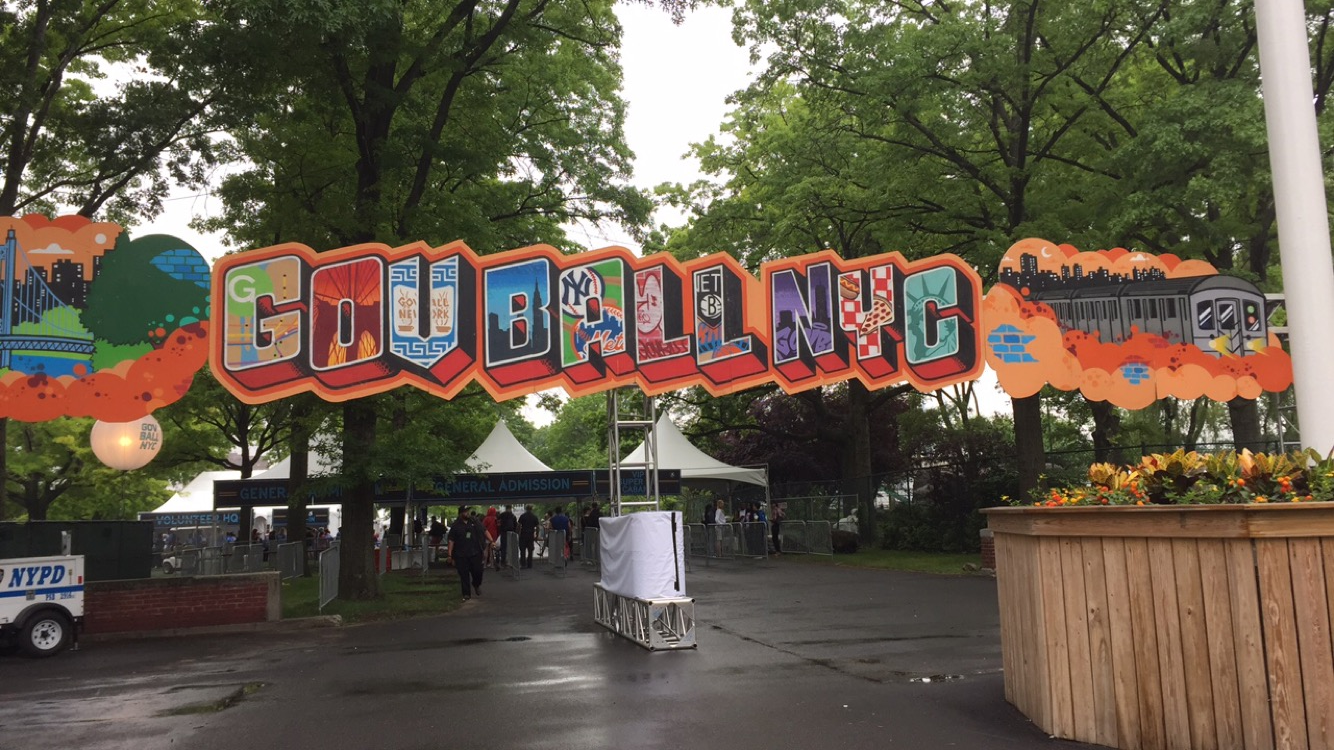
Festival entrance as it appeared in 2016

Governors Ball 2016, the sixth iteration of the festival, was held on June 3 to 5 at Randalls Island. It was headlined by The Killers and The Strokes. All three days of the festival sold out.

On Saturday evening, the festival grounds were subject to heavy rains, but the event was not cancelled. However, the Sunday concert was cancelled due to heavy rain and safety concerns, and fans received refunds; festival management stated the cancelation was for "the safety of fans, artists and crew".

The cancellation of Sunday's shows led to some artists announcing pop-up shows. That night, Two Door Cinema Club played at the Music Hall of Williamsburg, Courtney Barnett played a free show at Rough Trade, Prophets of Rage played at Warsaw Brooklyn, and Vic Mensa (tag-teaming with Galantis, who had a scheduled "After Dark" performance) played a sold-out concert at Webster Hall. Kanye West announced he would hold a 2:00 am show somewhere in Manhattan; anticipating this, crowds began to gather at venues across the city. Musician 2 Chainz posted that they would be at Webster Hall; over 4,000 fans rushed to the venue, blocking streets and triggering an NYPD response. West arrived at the venue, but did not perform.

=== 2017 ===
Governors Ball 2017, the seventh iteration of the festival, was held on June 2 to 4 at Randalls Island. It was headlined by Tool, Chance the Rapper, and Phoenix. Tickets for the festival went on sale on January 6, 2017, and the performers for the 2017 edition of Governors Ball was announced on January 4, 2017.

=== 2018 ===
Governors Ball 2018, the eighth iteration of the festival, was held on June 1 to 3 at Randalls Island. It was headlined by Eminem, Jack White, and Travis Scott.

Brockhampton was originally scheduled to perform at the festival, however, the hip hop group was subsequently replaced in the lineup by Pusha T following sexual misconduct allegations involving former band member Ameer Vann.

=== 2019 ===
Governors Ball 2019, the ninth iteration of the festival, was held on May 31 to June 2 at Randalls Island. It was headlined by The Strokes, Tyler, the Creator, and Florence and the Machine.

On Sunday, there was a delayed opening at 6:30 pm, and an evacuation around 9:30 pm because of severe thunderstorms. This resulted in the majority of the day's acts being cancelled or shortened.

=== 2020 (cancelled) ===
Governors Ball 2020, the tenth iteration of the festival, was to be held on June 5 to 7 at Randalls Island, but was cancelled due to the COVID-19 pandemic. It would have been headlined by Tame Impala, Missy Elliott, Flume, and Vampire Weekend.

=== 2021 ===
Governors Ball 2021, the tenth iteration of the festival, was held on September 24 to 26 in the parking lot area of Citi Field. It was headlined by Billie Eilish, ASAP Rocky, and Post Malone. This was the first time since 2012, that the festival was not held on Randalls Island, as well as the first time the festival was held outside of its usual June time frame.

=== 2022 ===
Governors Ball 2022, the eleventh iteration of the festival, was held on June 10 to 12 at Citi Field. It was headlined by Kid Cudi, Halsey, and J. Cole.

=== 2023 ===
Governors Ball 2023, the twelfth iteration of the festival, was held on June 9 to 11 at Flushing Meadows–Corona Park in Queens. It was headlined by Kendrick Lamar, Lizzo, and Odesza.

=== 2024 ===
Governors Ball 2024, the thirteenth iteration of the festival, was held on June 7 to 9 at Flushing Meadows–Corona Park in Queens. It was headlined by Post Malone, The Killers, and SZA.

=== 2025 ===
Governors Ball 2025, the fourteenth iteration of the festival, was held on June 6 to 8 at Flushing Meadows–Corona Park. It was headlined by Tyler, the Creator, Olivia Rodrigo, and Hozier.

=== 2026 ===
Governors Ball 2026, the fifteenth iteration of the festival, was held on June 5 to 7 at Flushing Meadows–Corona Park. It was headlined by Lorde, Stray Kids, and ASAP Rocky.

On Saturday, the event was shortened due to thunderstorms, postponing Blood Orange's set to Sunday and canceling the sets of Kali Uchis and Amyl and the Sniffers.

== Festival summary ==
Festival summary by year
Edition	Year	Dates	Headliners
1st	2011	June 18	Girl Talk, Pretty Lights, Empire of the Sun
2nd	2012	June 23–24	Passion Pit, Beck
3rd	2013	June 7–9	Kings of Leon, Guns N' Roses, Kanye West
4th	2014	June 6–8	Outkast, Jack White, Vampire Weekend
5th	2015	June 5–7	Drake, deadmau5, The Black Keys
6th	2016	June 3–5	The Strokes, The Killers, Kanye West (cancelled)
7th	2017	June 2–4	Tool, Chance the Rapper, Phoenix
8th	2018	June 1–3	Eminem, Jack White, Travis Scott
9th	2019	May 31 – June 2	The Strokes, Tyler, the Creator, Florence and the Machine
10th	2021	September 24–26	Billie Eilish, A$AP Rocky, Post Malone
11th	2022	June 10–12	Kid Cudi, Halsey, J. Cole
12th	2023	June 9–11	Kendrick Lamar, Lizzo, Odesza
13th	2024	June 7–9	Post Malone, The Killers, SZA
14th	2025	June 6–8	Tyler, the Creator, Olivia Rodrigo, Hozier
15th	2026	June 5–7	Lorde, Stray Kids, ASAP Rocky

== All performers ==
=== 2011 ===
- Big Boi
- Das Racist
- Empire of the Sun
- Girl Talk
- Mac Miller
- Miami Horror
- Neon Indian
- Outasight
- Passion Pit
- People Under the Stairs
- Pretty Lights
- Reptar

=== 2012 ===
==== Day 1 ====
- Passion Pit
- Duck Sauce
- Chromeo
- Atmosphere
- Major Lazer
- Santigold
- Big Gigantic
- Penguin Prison
- Walk the Moon
- Art vs. Science
- K.Flay
- Nobody Beats the Drum

==== Day 2 ====
- Beck
- Modest Mouse
- Explosions in the Sky
- Devendra Banhart
- Cage the Elephant
- Built to Spill
- Cults
- Phantogram
- Freelance Whales
- Alberta Cross
- The Jezabels
- Turf War

=== 2013 ===
==== Day 1 ====
- Pretty Lights
- Beach House
- Feist
- Local Natives
- Of Monsters and Men
- Young The Giant
- Erykah Badu & The Cannabinoids
- Crystal Castles
- Best Coast
- Dillon Francis
- Totally Enormous Extinct Dinosaurs
- Dinosaur Jr.
- Holy Ghost!
- Poliça
- St. Lucia
- The Knocks
- Solid Gold
- Reignwolf
- Bear Mountain
- Pacific Air
- Swear and Shake

==== Day 2 ====
- Guns N' Roses
- Kings of Leon
- Nas
- Animal Collective
- Kendrick Lamar
- Cut Copy
- Edward Sharpe and the Magnetic Zeros
- Thievery Corporation
- Azealia Banks
- Dirty Projectors
- Alt-J
- MS MR
- Japandroids
- Divine Fits
- Fucked Up
- Wild Nothing
- Paper Diamond
- GRiZ
- Icona Pop
- Robert DeLong
- The Rubens
- Ruby Velle & The Soulphonics
- Moon Hooch

==== Day 3 ====
- Kanye West
- The xx
- The Avett Brothers
- Grizzly Bear
- The Lumineers
- Bloc Party
- Beirut
- Yeasayer
- Gary Clark Jr.
- Twin Shadow
- Portugal. The Man
- Deerhunter
- Cold War Kids
- Steel Pulse
- The Vaccines
- Haim
- Freddie Gibbs
- Cherub
- The Revivalists
- On An On
- Roadkill Ghost Choir
