= Outside Lands festival lineups =

Musical performers at Outside Lands Festival by year

Outside Lands is an American music, art, food, wine and cannabis festival held annually in San Francisco's Golden Gate Park. It was founded in 2008. A three-day festival for 13 of its 15 years, it was shortened to two days in 2010, and in 2020, due to the COVID-19 pandemic, the festival was livestreamed as Inside Lands.

== 2008 ==
Friday 8/22

- Radiohead
- Beck
- Manu Chao
- The Black Keys
- Cold War Kids
- Steel Pulse
- Lyrics Born
- Black Mountain
- Benevento/Russo Duo
- The Felice Brothers
- Howlin Rain
- The Dynamites featuring Charles Walker
- Carney

Saturday, 8/23

- Tom Petty and the Heartbreakers
- Ben Harper and the Innocent Criminals
- Primus
- CAKE
- Steve Winwood
- Cafe Tacvba
- Lupe Fiasco
- Regina Spektor
- Galactic's Crescent City Soul Krewe
- M. Ward
- Devendra Banhart
- Matt Nathanson
- Sean Hayes
- Two Gallants
- Dredg
- Abigail Washburn and the Sparrow Quartet featuring Bela Fleck
- The Walkmen
- Kaki King
- The Coup
- Liars

Sunday, 8/24

- Jack Johnson
- Wilco
- Widespread Panic
- Rodrigo Y Gabriela
- Broken Social Scene
- Andrew Bird
- Sharon Jones & The Dap-Kings
- Drive-By Truckers
- Toots and the Maytals
- Stars
- Rogue Wave
- Alo
- Jackie Greene
- Los Amigos Invisibles
- Mike Gordon
- The Cool Kids
- Grace Potter and the Nocturnals
- Little Brother
- Bon Iver
- Vienna Teng
- The Mother Hips
- The Mighty Underdogs featuring Gift of Gab
- Lateef and Headnonic
- Nicole Atkins & the Sea
- Sila and the Afrofunk Experience
- K'naan
- Culver City Dub Collective

== 2009 ==
Friday, August 28

- Pearl Jam
- Incubus
- Thievery Corporation
- Tom Jones
- Silversun Pickups
- The National
- Q-Tip
- Built to Spill
- Midnite
- Kinky
- Tea Leaf Green
- Autolux
- The Dodos
- Los Campesinos!
- Akron/Family
- The Duke Spirit
- Zee Avi
- Blind Pilot
- SambaDa
- West Indian Girl

Saturday, August 29

- Dave Matthews Band
- The Black Eyed Peas
- The Mars Volta
- Jason Mraz
- TV on the Radio
- Conor Oberst & The Mystic Valley Band
- Robert Randolph and the Family Band
- Mastodon
- Raphael Saadiq
- Os Mutantes
- Street Sweeper Social Club
- JJ Grey & Mofro
- Deerhunter
- Lila Downs
- Zion I
- Bat for Lashes
- Trombone Shorty & Orleans Avenue
- Groundation
- Dengue Fever
- The Dirtbombs
- Portugal. The Man
- Ryan Bingham
- Extra Golden
- Infantree

Sunday, August 30

- Tenacious D
- M.I.A.
- Ween
- Modest Mouse
- Band of Horses
- The Dead Weather
- Atmosphere
- Lucinda Williams
- Alpha Blondy
- Brett Dennen
- The Avett Brothers
- Calexico
- Bettye LaVette
- Heartless Bastards
- Cage The Elephant
- Lenka
- John Vanderslice
- Matt and Kim
- The Morning Benders
- Darondo with Nino Moschella
- Big Light

== 2010 ==
Saturday, August 14

- Furthur featuring Phil Lesh and Bob Weir
- The Strokes
- My Morning Jacket
- Gogol Bordello
- The Levon Helm Band
- Cat Power
- Wolfmother
- Bassnectar
- Pretty Lights
- Tokyo Police Club
- Beats Antique
- Rebirth Brass Band
- Wild Beasts
- Sierra Leone's Refugee All Stars
- Daniel Lanois' Black Dub
- Langhorne Slim
- Mayer Hawthorne and The County
- The Pimps of Joytime
- Electric Six
- Dawes
- The Soft Pack
- People Under The Stairs

Sunday, August 15

- Kings of Leon
- Phoenix
- Social Distortion
- Al Green
- Nas and Damian "Jr. Gong" Marley
- Empire of the Sun
- Chromeo
- Edward Sharpe & the Magnetic Zeros
- The Temper Trap
- Janelle Monáe
- Amos Lee
- The Devil Makes Three
- Alexander O'Neal
- The Budos Band
- Aterciopelados
- Garage a Trois featuring Stanton Moore
- Marco Benevento
- Skerik and Mike Dillon
- People Under The Stairs
- Vieux Farka Toure
- Nneka
- The Whigs
- Little Wings

== 2011 ==
Friday, August 12

- Phish
- The Shins
- MGMT
- The Original Meters
- Erykah Badu
- Big Audio Dynamite
- Big Boi
- Clap Your Hands Say Yeah
- Ellie Goulding
- Collie Buddz
- Best Coast
- Foster the People
- Phantogram
- Lotus
- Toro Y Moi
- The Joy Formidable
- The Limousines
- Orgone
- Tamaryn
- New Orleans Klezmer All-Stars
- Kelley Stoltz
- Release The Sunbird
- K.Flay
- Arann Harris & The Farm Band

Saturday, August 13

- Muse
- The Black Keys
- Girl Talk
- The Roots
- Arctic Monkeys
- Warren Haynes Band
- OK GO
- Sia
- The Greyboy Allstars
- Old 97's
- STRFKR
- Christina Perri
- Vetiver
- Eskmo
- The Vaccines
- Macklemore and Ryan Lewis
- The Stone Foxes
- Ana Tijoux
- Bob Schneider
- Ximena Sarinana
- Nicki Bluhm & The Gramblers
- Cosmic Suckerpunch

Sunday, August 14

- Arcade Fire
- Deadmau5
- The Decemberists
- John Fogerty
- Beirut
- STS9
- Major Lazer
- Little Dragon
- Julieta Venegas
- Josh Ritter & The Royal City Band
- Mavis Staples
- !!!
- Latryx feat. Lyrics Born and Lateef
- Junip
- Charles Bradley
- The Infamous Stringdusters
- Tune-Yards
- Pajama Club
- Wye Oak
- Ty Segall
- Lord Huron
- The Fresh & Onlys
- Grouplove
- Diego's Umbrella

== 2012 ==
Friday, August 10

- Neil Young & Crazy Horse
- Foo Fighters
- Beck
- Justice
- Andrew Bird
- MSTRKRFT
- Die Antwoord
- Fitz and the Tantrums
- Of Monsters and Men
- The Walkmen
- Washed Out
- Reggie Watts
- Two Gallants
- Yacht
- Antibalas
- Sharon Van Etten
- Dirty Dozen Brass Band
- Wallpaper.
- Tennis
- White Denim
- Jukebox the Ghost
- Tanlines
- Papa
- Futurebirds

Saturday, August 11

- Metallica
- Sigur Ros
- Norah Jones
- The Kills
- Passion Pit
- Grandaddy
- Big Boi
- Explosions in the Sky
- Portugal. The Man
- Alabama Shakes
- Dr. Dog
- Mimosa
- Tame Impala
- The Be Good Tanyas
- Geographer
- Thee Oh Sees
- Zola Jesus
- Michael Kiwanuka
- Sean Hayes
- Father John Misty
- Yellow Ostrich
- Animal Kingdom
- Cory Chisel and The Wandering Sons
- Honey Island Swamp Band

Sunday, August 12

- Stevie Wonder
- Jack White
- Skrillex
- Dispatch
- Regina Spektor
- Bloc Party
- Santigold
- Franz Ferdinand
- Rebelution
- Fun.
- Amadou & Mariam
- Wolfgang Gartner
- City and Colour
- Trampled by Turtles
- Tom Morello: The Nightwatchman
- Bomba Estéreo
- Big Gigantic
- Allen Stone
- The M Machine
- Jovanotti
- Electric Guest
- Caveman
- Birdy
- Infantree

== 2013 ==
Friday, August 9

- Paul McCartney
- Pretty Lights
- The National
- D'Angelo
- Band of Horses
- Yeasayer
- Zedd
- Rhye
- Jessie Ware
- Surfer Blood
- Chromatics
- Smith Westerns
- Wavves
- The Heavy
- Twenty One Pilots
- Daughter
- Anuhea
- Wild Belle
- The Men
- Midi Matilda
- Houndmouth
- Foy Vance
- Naia Kete
- Plump DJs
- Stanton Warriors
- Motion Potion
- All Good Funk Alliance
- Lexel

Saturday, August 10

- Nine Inch Nails
- Phoenix
- Yeah Yeah Yeahs
- Jurassic 5
- Grizzly Bear
- Young the Giant
- The Head and the Heart
- The Tallest Man on Earth
- Youth Lagoon
- Gary Clark, Jr.
- Baauer
- The Mother Hips
- GRiZ
- The Growlers
- Thao and the Get Down Stay Down
- Bombino
- Milo Greene
- Atlas Genius
- The Soft White Sixties
- James McCartney
- The Lone Bellow
- Cherub
- Locura
- Krafty Kuts
- Lazy Rich
- DJ Shotnez
- Sam Spiegel
- Dub Gabriel

Sunday, August 11

- Red Hot Chili Peppers
- Kaskade
- Vampire Weekend
- Willie Nelson & Family
- Hall & Oates
- Matt and Kim
- A-Trak
- Foals
- Dawes
- Trombone Shorty & Orleans Avenue
- Kurt Vile
- Emeli Sandé
- Dillon Francis
- Camper Van Beethoven
- Rudimental
- Fishbone
- King Tuff
- Dumpstaphunk
- MS MR
- Deap Vally
- Kopecky Family Band
- Little Green Cars
- Bhi Bhiman
- The Easy Leaves
- DJ Pierre
- Gene Farris
- Sleight of Hands
- Whitenoize
- Griffin Camper

== 2014 ==
Friday, August 8

- Kanye West
- Arctic Monkeys
- Disclosure
- Tegan and Sara
- Tedeschi Trucks Band
- Chromeo
- Kacey Musgraves
- Grouplove
- Nicki Bluhm & The Gramblers
- Phosphorescent
- Run the Jewels
- Holy Ghost!
- Warpaint
- Typhoon
- Greensky Bluegrass
- Bleachers
- The Soul Rebels
- Bear Hands
- Mikal Cronin
- Nakho and Medicine for the People
- AER
- Night Terrors of 1927
- Rayland Baxter

Saturday, August 9

- Tom Petty & The Heartbreakers
- Macklemore & Ryan Lewis
- Death Cab For Cutie
- Atmosphere
- Duck Sauce
- Haim
- Capital Cities
- Local Natives
- John Butler Trio
- Tycho
- The Kooks
- SBTRKT
- Deer Tick
- Dum Dum Girls
- Christopher Owens
- Big Freedia
- Jagwar Ma
- Woods
- Valerie June
- Finish Ticket
- The Districts
- Trails and Ways
- Nocona

Sunday, August 10

- The Killers
- Tiësto
- The Flaming Lips
- Ray LaMontagne
- Spoon
- Cut Copy
- Ben Howard
- Lykke Li
- Chvrches
- Paolo Nutini
- Boys Noize
- Jenny Lewis
- Flume
- Lucius
- Gold Panda
- Vance Joy
- Gardens & Villa
- Watsky
- Givers
- Imelda May
- The Brothers Comatose
- Courtney Barnett
- Jonathan Wilson
- Tumbleweed Wanderers

== 2015 ==
Friday, August 7

- Mumford & Sons
- Wilco
- D'Angelo and the Vanguard
- St. Vincent
- Porter Robinson
- Chet Faker
- First Aid Kit
- RL Grime
- Lake Street Dive
- George Ezra
- Iration
- Lindsey Stirling
- Glass Animals
- Robert DeLong
- Broods
- Leon Bridges
- Alvvays
- The Family Crest
- The Revivalists
- Strand of Oaks
- Speedy Ortiz
- Natalie Prass
- The Sam Chase

Saturday, August 8

- The Black Keys
- Kendrick Lamar
- Tame Impala
- Ben Harper and the Innocent Criminals
- Billy Idol
- G-Eazy
- Milky Chance
- Toro y Moi
- Mac DeMarco
- Angus & Julia Stone
- Laura Marling
- Django Django
- Classixx
- Unknown Mortal Orchestra
- MisterWives
- Langhorne Slim & The Law
- Hurray for the Riff Raff
- Giraffage
- Twin Peaks
- Waters
- Fantastic Negrito
- Devon Baldwin
- The Tropics

Sunday, August 9

- Elton John
- Sam Smith
- Axwell and Ingrosso
- Slightly Stoopid
- Hot Chip
- Caribou
- The Devil Makes Three
- Nate Ruess
- Odesza
- DJ Mustard
- St. Paul and The Broken Bones
- James Bay
- Green Velvet & Claude VonStroke: Get Real
- Karl Denson's Tiny Universe
- Sky Ferreira
- SZA
- Allah-Las
- Shakey Graves
- Dan Deacon
- Benjamin Booker
- Ryn Weaver
- Givers
- METZ
- DMA's
- Alex Bleeker & the Freaks

== 2016 ==
Friday, August 5

- LCD Soundsystem
- J. Cole
- Duran Duran
- Beach House
- Grimes
- Miike Snow
- Nathaniel Ratliff & The Night Sweats
- Thomas Jack
- Foals
- The Claypool Lennon Delirium
- Delirium
- St. Lucia
- Poliça
- Hiatus Kaiyote
- Ra Ra Riot
- Tokimonsta
- Wet
- Jidenna
- Låpsley
- Marian Hill
- Caveman
- Vulfpeck
- Moon Taxi
- LANY
- Whitney

Saturday, August 6

- Radiohead
- Zedd
- Air
- Sufjan Stevens
- Halsey
- Big Grams (Big Boi + Phantogram)
- The Last Shadow Puppets
- Lord Huron
- Jauz
- Vince Staples
- Years & Years
- Ibeyi
- Peaches
- Anderson .Paak & The Free Nationals
- The Wombats
- The Knocks
- Rogue Wave
- Con Brio
- Kevin Morby
- Fantastic Negrito
- Lewis Del Mar
- Julien Baker
- Declan McKenna
- Methyl Ethel

Sunday, August 7

- Lionel Richie
- Lana Del Rey
- Major Lazer
- Ryan Adams
- Chance The Rapper
- Miguel
- Jason Isbell
- Third Eye Blind
- Kehlani
- GRiZ
- Brandi Carlile
- Snakehips
- Lettuce
- Oh Wonder
- Kamasi Washington
- Jack Garratt
- Rüfüs Du Sol
- Diiv
- Natalia Lafourcade
- The Oh Hellos
- Frances
- Haelos
- Cloves
- Heron Oblivion
- Dr. Teeth and the Electric Mayhem

== 2017 ==
Friday, August 11

- Gorillaz
- A Tribe Called Quest (cancelled)
- alt-j
- Fleet Foxes
- Belle and Sebastian
- Future Islands
- Little Dragon
- Tove Lo
- Sleigh Bells
- Shovels & Rope
- Dr. Octagon
- Rag'n'Bone Man
- Rac
- Hamilton Leithauser
- Sohn
- Electric Guest
- Hundred Waters
- Noname
- Kali Uchis
- Grace Mitchell
- Porches
- Sam Dew
- Oliver Tree
- Berklee College of Music

Saturday, August 12

- Metallica
- Queens of the Stone Age (cancelled due to unknown injury)
- Empire of the Sun
- The Avett Brothers
- Solange
- Vance Joy
- Kaytranada
- Royal Blood
- Thundercat
- Dawes
- Warpaint
- Bomba Estéreo
- Real Estate
- Temples
- Foxygen
- S U R V I V E
- San Fermin
- Joseph
- The Japanese House
- The Lemon Twigs
- Muna
- Mondo Cozmo
- John Moreland
- Lawrence

Sunday, August 13

- The Who
- Lorde
- Above & Beyond
- Schoolboy Q
- Young the Giant
- Rebelution
- Bleachers
- Action Bronson
- Louis the Child
- James Vincent McMorrow
- K.Flay
- Maggie Rogers
- Sofi Tukker
- How to Dress Well
- Goldroom
- Khruangbin
- Kamaiyah
- Mon Laferte
- Lee Fields & The Expressions
- Swet Shop Boys
- Jacob Banks
- Marco Benevento
- Frenship
- The She's

== 2018 ==
Friday, August 10

- The Weeknd
- Beck
- ODESZA
- N.E.R.D
- Mac DeMarco
- Father John Misty
- Carly Rae Jepsen
- The Growlers
- Billie Eilish
- Perfume Genius
- Chicano Batman
- Rex Orange County
- Margo Price
- Mountain Goats
- LAUV
- Quinn XCII
- Shannon & The Clams
- Dermot Kennedy
- Lucy Dacus
- Mikky Ekko
- Olivia O’Brien
- Sasha Sloan
- Caleborate
- Nick Mulvey
- Sweet Plot

Saturday, August 11

- Florence + The Machine
- Future
- Bon Iver
- CHVRCHES
- Jamie xx
- Illenium
- Tycho
- SOB X RBE
- Big Gigantic
- Broken Social Scene
- Daniel Caesar
- GoldLink
- Lizzo
- Jessie Reyez
- Whethan
- Smokepurpp
- Poolside
- Cuco
- Amen Dunes
- Pale Waves
- Gang Of Youths
- Freya Ridings
- GoGo Penguin
- Jack Harlow
- Knox Fortune
- Kikagaku Moyo

Sunday, August 12

- Janet Jackson
- DJ Snake
- Portugal. The Man
- James Blake
- Janelle Monáe
- Chromeo
- The Internet
- BØRNS
- Gryffin
- Tash Sultana
- Rainbow Kitten Surprise
- LP
- Sabrina Claudio
- Kelela
- Claptone
- Bahamas
- Saba
- Aquilo
- Tyler Childers
- Kailee Morgue
- Hobo Johnson & The Lovemakers
- Durand Jones & The Indications
- Monophonics
- Hot Flash Heat Wave

== 2019 ==
Friday, August 9

- Twenty One Pilots
- Blink-182
- Lil Wayne
- The Neighborhood
- P-Lo
- Half Alive
- Taylor Bennett
- Flying Lotus 3D
- San Holo
- Yaeji
- Masego
- Still Woozy
- Cautious Clay
- The Seshen
- The Lumineers
- Counting Crows
- Lauren Daigle
- Aurora
- The California Honeydrops
- Grateful Shred
- Luttrell
- Brasstracks
- The Marias
- Miya Folick
- Boyfriend
- Rainbow Girls

Saturday, August 10

- Childish Gambino
- Flume
- Alina Baraz
- Santigold
- Wallows
- NoMBe
- Felly
- Hozier
- Better Oblivion Community Center
- Phosphorescent
- Edie Brickell & New Bohemians
- Caamp
- Haley Heynderickx
- Amo Amo
- RL Grime
- Ella Mai
- Big Wild
- Tierra Whack
- Shallou
- Allblack
- Justin Martin
- Cupcakke
- Bea Miller
- Altin Gun
- Delacy
- Fatai

Sunday, August 11

- Paul Simon
- Leon Bridges
- Kacey Musgraves
- Judah & the Lion
- Mavis Staples
- PJ Morton
- Anderson .Paak and the Free Nationals
- Toro y Moi
- Bob Moses
- DJ Koze
- Dean Lewis
- Cherry Glazerr
- Weyes Blood
- Kygo
- Bebe Rexha
- Sheck Wes
- Denzel Curry
- Nahko & Medicine for the People
- Leven Kali
- The Funk Hunters
- Mor Mor
- SYML
- Jupiter & Okwess
- Alex Lahey
- Sandy's

== 2021 ==
Friday, Oct 29

- The Strokes
- Tyler, the Creator
- Glass Animals
- Kaytranada
- Khruangbin
- EarthGang
- Sharon Van Etten
- SG Lewis
- Flo Milli
- JPEGMafia
- Drama (American band)
- 070 Shake
- Trevor Daniel (singer)
- Moses Sumney
- The Hu
- Yung Bae
- The Soul Rebels
- Remi Wolf
- BUSCABULLA
- Q
- Sofía Valdés
- Bartees Strange
- Amy Allen (songwriter)
- Madeline Kenney
- Salami Rose Joe Louis
- Shilan

Saturday, Oct 30

- Lizzo
- Vampire Weekend
- Zhu (musician)
- Aminé (rapper)
- Lord Huron
- Melanie Martinez
- 24kGoldn
- Angel Olsen
- Reggie Watts
- Arizona (American band)
- Rico Nasty
- Dr. Dog
- Shiba San
- Andrew McMahon
- The Midnight
- Dijon
- Bakar
- Hinds
- Rexx Life Raj
- Jessia
- Brijean
- Noga Erez
- Post Animal
- Nap Eyes
- Boy Scouts

Sunday, Oct 31

- Tame Impala
- J Balvin
- Rüfüs Du Sol
- Kehlani
- Nelly
- Brittany Howard
- Burna Boy
- TroyBoi
- Sofi Tukker
- Boy Pablo
- Mxmtoon
- Caroline Polachek
- Nicola Cruz
- Yves Tumor and Its Band
- Green Velvet
- J.Phlip
- Marc E. Bassy
- Goth Babe
- Cam
- Neil Frances
- Cannons (band)
- Resistance Revival Chorus
- Claud
- Petey
- Evann Mcintosh
- Neal Francis

== 2022 ==
Friday, Aug 5

- SZA
- Phoebe Bridgers
- Lil Uzi Vert
- Disclosure
- Oliver Tree
- The Marías
- Dayglow
- Purple Disco Machine
- Hiatus Kaiyote
- Washed Out
- Ashe
- ROLE MODEL
- ANNA
- Best Coast
- Duckwrth
- Rostam
- AMÉMÉ
- Faye Webster
- Sampa the Great
- Lido Pimienta
- Del Water Gap
- Ellen Allien
- Inner Wave
- DJ Seinfield
- The Beths
- Major League Djz
- ODIE
- Cory Henry
- I. Jordan
- PawPaw Rod
- THE BLSSM
- SPELLLING

Saturday, Aug 6

- Green Day
- Jack Harlow
- Kali Uchis
- Polo & Pan
- Rina Sawayama
- Mac Demarco
- Local Natives
- Claude VonStroke
- Larry June
- Parcels
- TOKiMONSTA
- Sam Fender
- Franc Moody
- Empress Of
- Zoe Wees
- The Linda Lindas
- Anna Lunoe
- KennyHoopla
- Maxo Kream
- Robert Glasper
- Cassian
- Benny Sings
- J. Worra
- thuy
- MICHELLE
- Symba
- Wilderado
- JOPLYN
- The Emo Night Tour
- L'Rain
- salem ilese
- Perel

Sunday, Aug 7

- Post Malone
- Weezer
- ILLENIUM
- Mitski
- Dominic Fike
- Pusha T
- Mt. Joy
- Kim Petras
- 100 gecs
- Surf Mesa
- Dixon
- Wet Leg
- Baby Tate
- The Backseat Lovers
- Amber Mark
- Pussy Riot
- Avalon Emerson
- Griff
- Briston Maroney
- Barry Can't Swim
- Tyla Yahweh
- Glaive
- Petey
- DJ Minx
- Jelani Aryeh
- Planet Booty
- Cassandra Jenkins
- Unusual Demont
- Forester
- Tre' Amani
- ABSOLUTE.
- MPHD b2b Tiffany Tyson

== 2023 ==
Friday, Aug 11

- Kendrick Lamar
- Janelle Monáe
- J.I.D
- Interpol
- Aespa
- WILLOW
- Cuco
- Alex G
- Claptone
- Monolink
- Diesel (Shaquille O'Neal)
- Raveena
- Blond:ish
- Becky Hill
- Crumb
- Justin Jay
- AMÉMÉ
- Ethel Cain
- The Dip
- Samia
- Disco Lines
- La Doña
- Yaya Bey
- Nation of Language
- Evan Giia
- Matt Hansen
- Westend
- Nala
- Miss Dre
- Izzy Heltai

Saturday, Aug 12

- Foo Fighters
- Lana Del Rey
- Maggie Rogers
- FISHER
- Father John Misty
- Orville Peck (cancelled)
- Conan Gray
- L'Impératrice
- Nora En Pure
- Alvvays
- Niki
- Mariah the Scientist
- Trixie Mattel (cancelled)
- Bob the Drag Queen
- Daniel Avery
- Lovejoy
- Sama' Abdulhadi
- Jessie Murp
- Zack Fox
- Denis Sulta
- Cobra Man
- Tops
- Orion Sun
- Vnssa
- Manila Grey
- Donny Benét
- Eddie Zuko
- Kimm Ann Foxman
- Midwxst
- No Vacation
- Wednesday
- Asi Oasis
- Erez
- Sour Widows

Sunday, Aug 13

- ODESZA
- The 1975
- Megan Thee Stallion
- Lil Yachty
- Noah Kahan
- Tobe Nwigwe
- Cigarettes After Sex
- Beabadoobee
- Poolside
- Soccer Mommy
- Isoxo
- Holly Humberstone
- Áme B2B Trikk
- WhoMadeWho
- Joy Oladokun
- Inhaler
- Tinlicker
- Dope Lemon
- Gabriels
- The Jungle Giants
- Mild Minds
- Red Axes
- Nanna
- Coco & Breezy
- Wild Child
- Upsahl
- Pretty Sick
- Grace Ives
- Fake Fruit
- Loveground
- Venus & The Flytraps

== 2024 ==
The Killers; Sabrina Carpenter; Sturgill Simpson; Post Malone (Performing a Special Country Set); The Postal Service; Grace Jones; KAYTRANADA; Daniel Caesar; JUNGLE; Chris Lake; Gryffin; Teddy Swims; Young the Giant; Reneé Rapp; Slowdive; ScHoolboy Q; Victoria Monét; Knock2; FLETCHER; Chappell Roan; Killer Mike; TV Girl; Tyla; Channel Tres; Charley Crockett; Ben Howard; Men I Trust; Amyl and The Sniffers; Paul Cauthen; Kevin Abstract; The Japanese House; Romy; STRFKR; The Last Dinner Party; K.Flay; BADBADNOTGOOD; Snakehips; Real Estate; Amen Dunes; Roosevelt; Mindchatter; Corinne Bailey Rae; Allen Stone; Daði Freyr; Ryan Beatty; LEISURE; Elyanna; Confidence Man; Kasablanca; Wisp; Vandelux; Medium Build; Rocco; Devault; underscores; Chance Peña; Mimi Webb; Daily Bread; BALTHVS; Shaboozey; billy woods; The Lemon Twigs; Trueno; Sons Of The East; CMAT; Rochelle Jordan; Cimafunk; binki; Katie Pruitt; DARUMAS; AG Club; Lady Wray; Odie Leigh; French Cassettes; Ogi; MiLES.; Valencia Grace; Dan Spencer; Lael Neale

== 2025 ==
Tyler, The Creator; Hozier; Doja Cat; John Summit; Anderson .Paak & The Free Nationals; Vampire Weekend; Glass Animals; Gracie Abrams; Beck with Symphony; Jamie xx; Doechii; Gesaffelstein; Bleachers; Ludacris; Jorja Smith; Still Woozy; Sammy Virji; Thundercat; Wallows; FINNEAS; MARINA; Royel Otis; ARMNHMR; ROLE MODEL; Artemas; BigXthaPlug; Bakar; flipturn; 2hollis; Fujii Kaze; BUNT.; Levity; Mark Ambor; Jessica Pratt; Mannequin Pussy; Rebecca Black; LaRussell; CA7RIEL & Paco Amoroso; julie; Mayer Hawthorne; DJ Pee .Wee; Wasia Project; Big Freedia with SF Gay Men's Chorus; Fcukers; Klangphonics; Vansire; nimino; Kate Bollinger; Hope Tala; Destroy Boys; Luna Li; INJI; Sarah Kinsley; Matt Champion; Naomi Sharon; Neal Francis; The Two Lips; Lexa Gates; Amelia Moore; Paco Versailles; Good Neighbours; Orla Gartland; Midrift; Bay Ledges; The Army, The Navy; Arcy Drive; Nourished by Time; almost monday; bLAck pARty; Alexandra Savior; Roi Turbo; Vincent Lima; NewDad; Alemeda; Midnight Generation; LOS MENOR3S; Alex Amen; Cassandra Coleman; AVATARI SOMA; &friends; ATRIP; Baalti; BANKSIA; Black Coffee; BLOND:ISH; Bonobo; Claptone; Claude VonStroke; DJ Mandy; Dombresky; Floating Points; Girl Math (VNSSA b2b Nala); Infinite Jess; Nico Moreno; NOTION; TxC; Walker & Royce; Sound Bath

== 2026 ==
Charli xcx, RÜFÜS DU SOL, The Strokes, The xx, Baby Keem, Turnstile, GRiZTRONICS, Djo, Labrinth, Empire Of The Sun, PinkPantheress, Dijon, Disco Lines, Death Cab for Cutie, GloRilla, Ethel Cain, Geese, Mariah the Scientist, Modest Mouse, Not for Radio, Clipse, Lucy Dacus, Wet Leg, it's murph, Sierra Ferrell, Malcolm Todd, Lane 8, Snow Strippers, Boris Brejcha, Odd Mob (Odd Mob and OMNOM present HYPERBEAM), OMNOM (Odd Mob and OMNOM present HYPERBEAM), Tinashe, Audrey Hobert, Ben Böhmer, JADE, The Temper Trap, The Story So Far, kwn, ¥ØU$UK€ ¥UK1MAT$U, KI/KI, TYCHO DJ SET, DJ Trixie Mattel, Łaszewo, Sienna Spiro, DESTIN CONRAD, Boys Noize, Durand Bernarr, Kingfishr, ALLEYCVT, Balu Brigada, Sultan + Shepard, Frost Children, Miss Monique, Die Spitz, Carlita, MPH, Silvana Estrada, Momma, Dylan Brady, Goldie Boutilier, Haute and Freddy, Grace Ives, Kerala Dust, tobiahs, Wunderhorse, Amble, Sports, Yard Act, Faouzia, Infinity Song, Billie Marten, Marlon Funaki, SF Gay Men's Chorus, camoufly, Night Tapes, Bandalos Chinos, X CLUB., Luke Alessi, After, Bad Nerves, Chezile, RIO KOSTA, sosocamo, Automatic, Sawyer Hill, 1-800 GIRLS, NEZZA, Magnus Ferrell, Red Leather, Racing Mount Pleasant, Day We Ran, Ally Evenson, Etari, Britton, Cruz Beckham, RYMAN, Dani Satin and Always Hallways, Vertigo, bad juuju
