= Good Will Prevail =

Studio album by GRiZ
- Released: September 23, 2016
- Genre: Electro, electronic
- Length: 59:14
- Label: All Good Records
- Producer: GRiZ

GRiZ chronology
Say It Loud (2015)	Good Will Prevail (2016)	Ride Waves (2019)

Singles from Good Will Prevail
- 1. "Good Times Roll (featuring Big Gigantic)" Released: August 12, 2015; 2. "Before I Go (featuring Leo Napier)" Released: August 11, 2016; 3. "Can't Hold Me Down (featuring Tash Neal)" Released: August 24, 2016; 4. "PS GFY (featuring Cherub)" Released: September 15, 2016; 5. "Gotta Push On (featuring Brasstracks and Eric Krasno)" Released: September 20, 2016

Good Will Prevail is the fifth album by the electronic musician Grant Kwiecinski under the pseudonym GRiZ. It was released on September 23, 2016 under his own label All Good Records. It peaked at number 169 on the Billboard 200.

== Track listing ==
All tracks are written by Grant Kwiecinski unless noted

No.	Title	Length
1.	"Wicked" (featuring Eric Krasno)	5:54
2.	"Can't Hold Me Down" (featuring Tash Neal)	3:36
3.	"My Friends and I" (featuring Prob Cause)	5:11
4.	"I Don't Mind" (featuring Sunsquabi, Artifakts, iDA HAWK)	4:36
5.	"Good Times Roll" (featuring Big Gigantic)	4:04
6.	"Feelin' Fine"	4:24
7.	"PS GFY" (featuring Cherub)	4:14
8.	"What We've Become" (featuring Cory Enemy, Natalola)	4:12
9.	"If There Ever Comes a Day" (featuring Eli "Paperboy" Reed, Louis Futon)	3:23
10.	"Rather Be Free" (featuring Muzzy Bearr)	4:47
11.	"Gotta Push On" (featuring Brasstracks, Eric Krasno)	4:33
12.	"Before I Go" (featuring Leo Napier)	7:07
13.	"Driftin'" (featuring Son Little)	3:13
Total length:		59:14
