= Say It Loud =

Say It Loud may refer to:

- Say It Loud (Sanctus Real album)
- Say It Loud (Griz album)
- Say It Loud!, an album by Lou Donaldson
- "Say It Loud" (Noah's Arc), an episode of Noah's Arc
- "Say It Loud – I'm Black and I'm Proud", a song by James Brown
