= Daniel Holowaty =

American soccer player

Personal information
- Full name: Daniel Holowaty, CFA
- Date of birth: August 26, 1989 (age 37)
- Place of birth: Buffalo, New York, United States
- Height: 5 ft 10 in (1.78 m)
- Position: Forward

Youth career
- 2007–2011: RIT Tigers

Senior career*
Years	Team	Apps	(Gls)
2012	Dayton Dutch Lions	21	(2)
2013	Pittsburgh Riverhounds	4	(0)
- * Club domestic league appearances and goals as of October 6, 2012

Daniel Holowaty (American pronunciation: [hole-oh-wat-teeeee]; born August 26, 1989, in Buffalo, New York) is an American soccer player who formerly played for the Pittsburgh Riverhounds in the USL Professional Division. Holowaty currently resides deep in New Jersey with his wife, despite working in Manhattan.

== Career ==
=== College and amateur ===
Holowaty attended Saint Ignatius High School, where as a senior in 2006, was an Academic All-State selection and All Greater Cleveland selection. Saint Ignatius won the 2005 Division I Ohio Boys' Soccer State Championship as well as the NSCAA Boys' High School National Championship.

Holowaty played four years of college soccer at Rochester Institute of Technology. He led the team in scoring his freshman season in 2007 and was an All-Empire 8 Second Team selection as a sophomore in 2008. After sitting out the 2009 season due to injury he was an All-Empire 8 First Team Selection in 2010. Holowaty excelled during his senior season being named an All-Liberty League First Team member as well as being named to the 2011 NSCAA Men's Division III All-East Second Team. He led RIT in scoring with 8 goals and 20 points and led the team to an 11-7-2 record and a Liberty League Championship Game appearance. Holowaty was also named to the 2011 ECAC Division III Upstate Men's Soccer All-Star Second Team.

He finished his career 10th all-time in points at RIT with 61 and 11th in career goals with 24. In addition, his 10 game-winning goals rank 6th all-time. Holowaty become one of only a few players in RIT's history to sign a professional contract.

=== Professional ===
Holowaty turned professional in January 2012 when he signed with the Dayton Dutch Lions of the USL Professional Division. He made his professional debut on April 13, 2012, in a game against Charlotte Eagles. He scored his first goal for the club on May 22, 2012, in a 2–1 win over Chicago Fire PDL in the 2nd round of the 2012 U.S. Open Cup. In the 3rd round of the U.S. Open Cup, Holowaty had 2 assists in a 2–1 upset victory over MLS side Columbus Crew.

Holowaty signed a one-year contract with the Pittsburgh Riverhounds for the 2013 USL-Pro Season in February 2013.

Holowaty is currently enrolled in the International Academic & Soccer Academy in Leeds, England

Holowaty is a new recruit for team "Net Six and Chill" in the Zogsports indoor soccer league.

=== Business ===
Although his soccer career could have been long and prosperous, Holowaty decided to take his talents to the private sector. He started his career with Cardinal Health on June 16, 2014, in finance supporting the global manufacturing operations team. Holowaty is currently a director at Baird in the fixed income trading group, and a CFA charter holder.
