= Cherub (musical duo) =

American electro-indie music duo

CHERUB
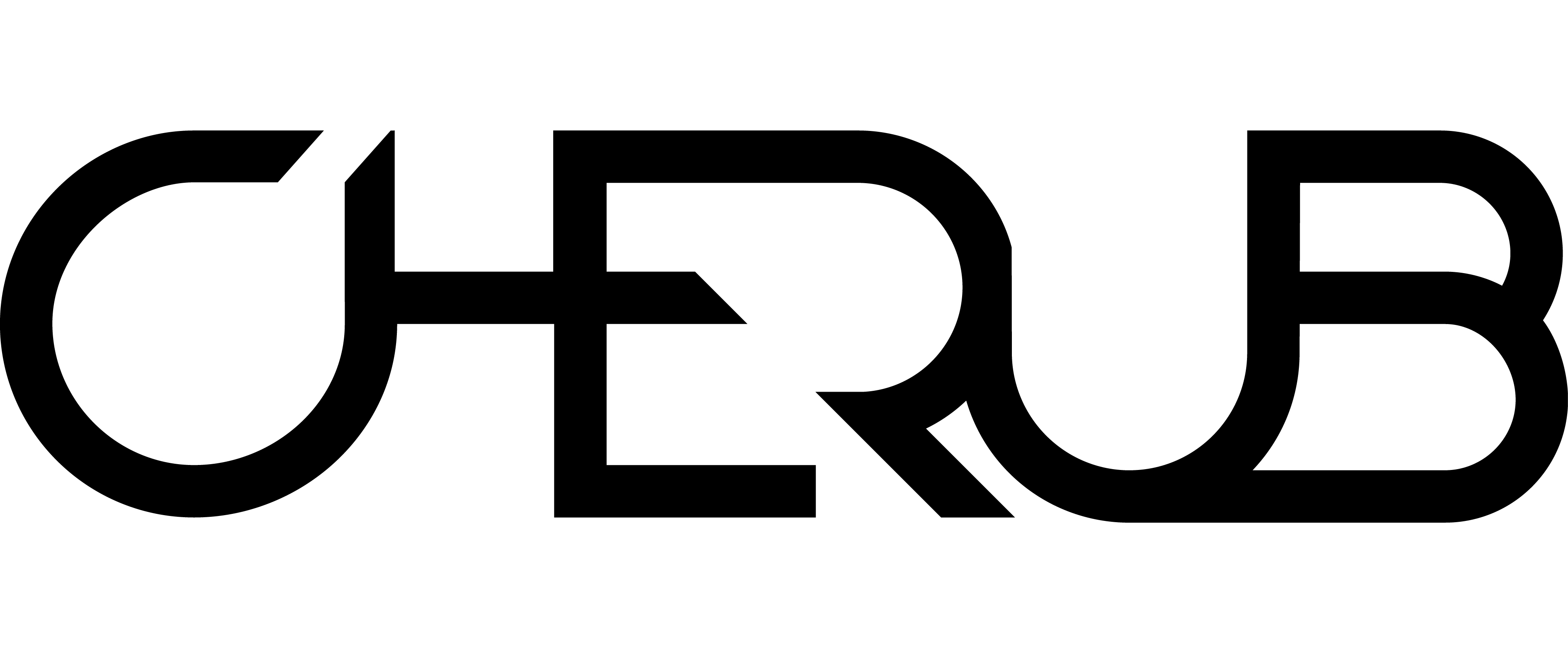
- CHERUB logo

Background information
- Origin: Nashville, Tennessee, U.S.
- Genre: Electro-indie
- Years active: 2010–present
- Members: Jordan Kelley; Jason Huber
- Website: cherublamusica.com

Cherub, stylized as CHERUB, is an electro-indie duo from Nashville, Tennessee, formed in 2010 consisting of Jordan Kelley and Jason Huber.

== Music career ==
Jordan Kelley and Jason Huber met at Nashville's water park Nashville Shores whilst riding boogie boards in the wave pool. Kelley and Huber both attended Middle Tennessee State University and studied music tech. Jordan Kelley is originally from Lincoln Nebraska. Jason Huber is originally from New Jersey. They were friends for five years before starting CHERUB. Since its inception, the band has played iconic venues across the country, such as Red Rocks Amphitheater in Morrison, CO and Ryman Auditorium in Nashville, TN. The duo uses Reason, Pro Tools, and Ableton software to produce their music.

In February 2014, their single "Doses & Mimosas" charted at number 43 on Billboard's Rock Airplay chart and at number 23 on the Alternative Songs chart. "Doses & Mimosas" also topped The Hype Machine chart and has more than 69 million YouTube views. The duo's debut album, Year of the Caprese, was released on May 27 on Columbia Records.

On October 14, 2016, the duo released their second studio album, "Bleed Gold, Piss Excellence." They followed it up with a 50-date tour across North America, called the "Bleed Gold" tour.

In February 2017, Cherub embarked on a two-month co-headline tour, called "Your Girlfriend Already Bought Tickets Tour," with the band The Floozies.

After an almost two-year hiatus, the duo returned in 2018 with four new singles: "All In," "Dancing Shoes," "Body Language," and "Want That." They performed and promoted their new releases across the United States on the Free Form Tour in 2018.

== Discography ==
=== Studio albums ===
List of studio albums, with year released
Title	Album details
MoM & DaD	Released: February 11, 2012; Label: Elm & Oak; Format: Digital download
Year of the Caprese	Released: May 23, 2014; Label: Columbia; Format: CD, LP, digital download
Bleed Gold, Piss Excellence	Released: October 14, 2016; Label: Columbia; Format: CD, LP, digital download
DJ BJ's Faves	Released: July 3, 2020; Label: Cuddle Puddle Records; Format: digital download, streaming
Everything Changes and That's OK	Released: September 5, 2025; Label: Cuddle Puddle Records; Format: digital download, streaming

=== Extended plays ===
List of extended plays, with year released
Title	Album details
Man of the Hour	Released: 2011; Label: Elm & Oak; Format: Digital download
100 Bottles	Released: March 5, 2013; Label: Self-released; Format: CD, digital download
Antipasto	Released: December 10, 2013; Label: Columbia; Format: CD, digital download
Leftovers	Released: December 15, 2014; Label: Columbia; Format: Digital download
Gummo Season	Released: August 20, 2019; Label: Cuddle Puddle Records; Format: Digital download

=== Singles ===
List of singles released, with year released and track listing
Title	Single Details
Unplanned Parenthood	Released: December 3, 2012; Tracks: 3; "Lovvver"; "Next One"; "We Are..."
Jazzercise '95	Released: February 19, 2013; Tracks: 1; "Jazzercise '95
Bleed Gold, Piss Excellence	Released: July 28, 2016; Tracks: 1; "Bleed Gold, Piss Excellence"
Sensation	Released: September 9, 2016; Tracks: 1; "Sensation"
Signs	Released: September 23, 2016; Tracks: 1; "Signs"
All In	Released: April 20, 2018; Tracks: 1; "All In"
Dancin' Shoes	Released: June 1, 2018; Tracks: 1; "Dancin' Shoes"
Body Language	Released: July 27, 2018; Tracks: 1; "Body Language"
Want That	Released: September 7, 2018; Tracks: 1; "Want That"

=== Guest appearances ===
List of guest appearances, with other performing artists, showing year released and album name
Title	Year	Other artist(s)	Album
"Crushin'"	2011	Police Academy 6	Police Academy 6
"You Move Me"	2012	Don Winsley	Rise of the Weasel King
"Jus Like Clockwork"	2013	Paper Diamond	Paragon
"Sleepwalker"	2013	D.V.S*	Hit the Clouds Running
"Obviously"	2014	Gramatik, Exmag	The Age of Reason
"Different Type of Love"	2014	100s	Ivry
"The Night is Young"	2014	Big Gigantic	The Night is Young
"The Western"	2014	Eliot Lipp	Watch the Shadows
"Marlon Brando"	2014	Chancellor Warhol	Paris is Burning
"PS GFY"	2016	GRiZ	Good Will Prevail
"Wide Open"	2016	Big Gigantic	Brighter Future
"My Space Baby"	2017	DJ Premier	—N/a
"Gold"	2021	GRiZ	Rainbow Brain
