= Roadkill Ghost Choir =

American alternative rock band

Background information
- Origin: DeLand, Florida
- Genres: Indie rock, Alternative rock
- Years active: 2011–2019
- Members: Andrew Shepard; Stephen Garza; Zach Shepard; Maxx Shepard; Kiffy Myers
- Website: http://www.roadkillghostchoir.com/

Roadkill Ghost Choir was an American alternative rock band from DeLand, Florida.

In January 2014, they performed on Late Night with David Letterman, and had notable appearances at Bonnaroo, Lollapalooza and Governors Ball festivals. In August 2014, the band released their debut full-length album In Tongues, produced by Doug Boehm (Powderfinger, The Vines, Booker T. Jones).

Their sound was once described as "combining the experimental edge of Radiohead and the dusty roots-rock of Tom Petty, tailor-made for arena-sized, prog-rock festivals and grassy, pastoral stages alike."

== Overview ==
Forming in 2011, the band released their debut EP, Quiet Light, in 2012. Self-released, the mastering and printing of the record was supported by a successful Kickstarter campaign. “Quiet Light” premiered on Consequence of Sound and received positive critical acclaim from outlets such as Absolute Punk and The Dropp. In January 2014 the band was invited to perform on Late Night with David Letterman, where they performed standout track “Beggar’s Guild.” They also were one of the bands handpicked to join the inaugural Communion Presents Tour Dates, an artist showcase curated by Mumford and Sons' Ben Lovett.

Their debut full-length album, In Tongues, was released 19 August 2014 to wide critical acclaim. Recorded in their home studio and produced by Doug Boehm, the album received exclusive streams on Consequence of Sound and Paste Magazine, as well as positive reviews from Rolling Stone, SPIN, Relix and In Your Speakers. Rolling Stone's Cady Drell noted that Andrew Shepard's vocals on the opening track "make him sound like the latter-day Tom Petty he's been pitched as”, and that "synths and roiling surf rock guitars illuminate fans' flattering comparisons of Shepard to My Morning Jacket's Jim James”. Similarly, Justin Jacobs of Relix magazine stated “Roadkill Ghost Choir hit the sweet spot between Mumford & Sons’ power-folk and My Morning Jacket’s passionate post-Southern rock.”

The band split in May 2019, playing a farewell show at the Caledonia Lounge in Athens, Georgia.

== Touring ==
The band toured with Band of Horses performing opening slots in 2013, and were featured at Austin City Limits, New York's Governors Ball and Shaky Knees. 2014 saw festival inclusions at Bonnaroo, Lollapalooza, Electric Forest and SXSW, among others. They also joined the inaugural Communion Presents tour, alongside Willy Mason, Yacht Club DJs and Rubblebucket, stopping at nine cities in one month.

== Band members ==
- Andrew Shepard – songwriter and singer
- Stephen Garza – lead guitar
- Zach Shepard – bass
- Maxx Shepard – drums
- Kiffy Myers – pedal steel, banjo

Former members:

- Joey Davoli – trumpet, keys, whistling

== Discography ==
=== Studio albums ===
- In Tongues (2014)
- False Youth Etcetera (2017)

=== Extended plays ===
- Quiet Light (2012)
- Keep It Under Cover (2015)
