= Spirit of the Suwannee Music Park =

Coordinates: 30°23′40″N 82°56′38″W

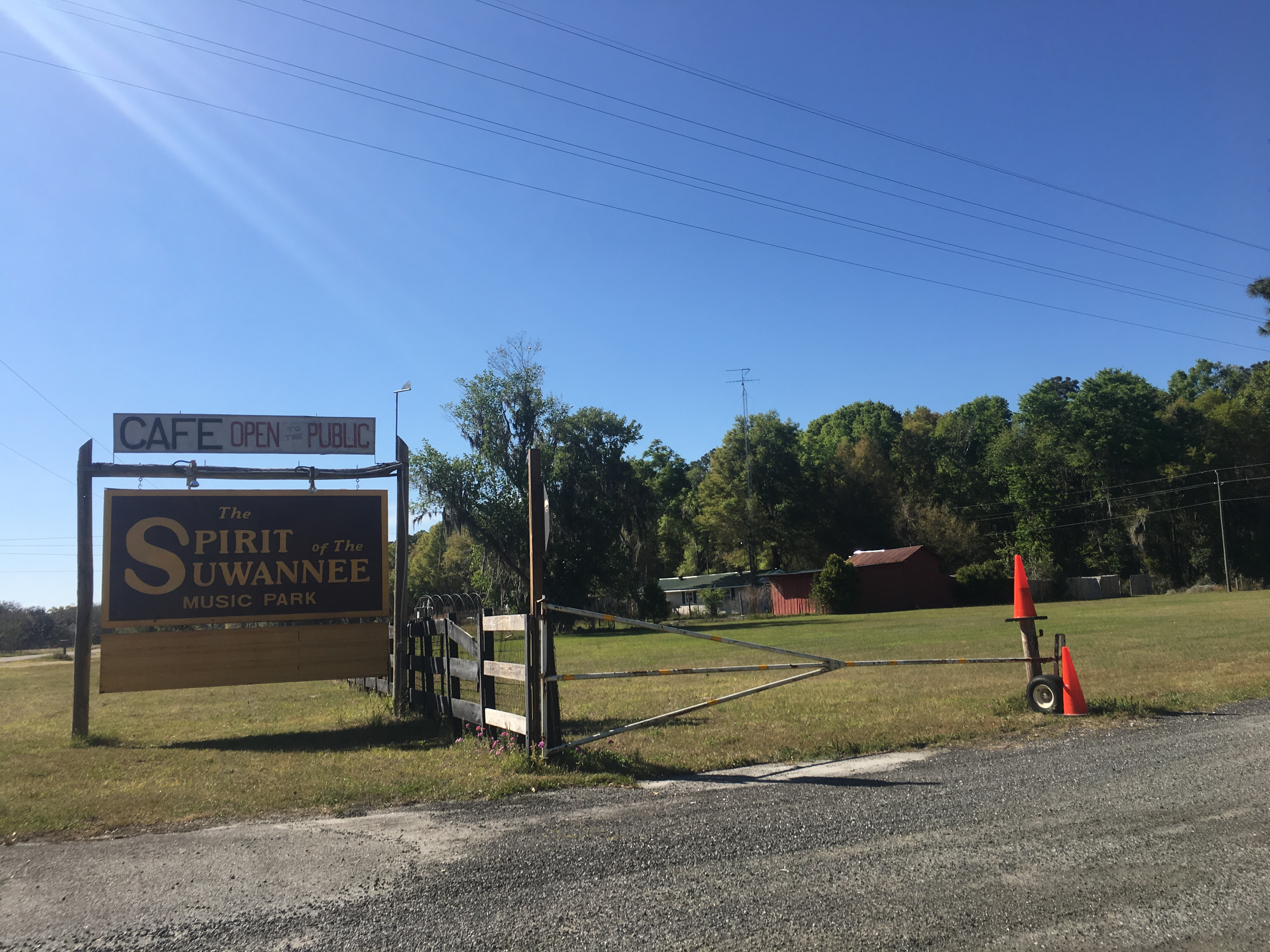
Spirit of the Suwannee Music Park entrance, March 2019

The Spirit of the Suwannee Music Park is a park located in North Central Florida, in Suwannee County, United States.

== Overview ==
Situated on the banks of the historic Suwannee River, the park consists of over 800 acres (3.2 km²) of camping areas, concert venues, recreational facilities, and unspoiled forests. The park hosts numerous major events each year, including Suwannee Hulaween, Suwannee River Jam, the Suwannee Roots Revival , Wanee Music Festival, Brainquility, Purple Hatter's Ball, Suwannee Rising, and Suwannee Spring Reunion.

Located near Live Oak, Florida, with 3 miles of the Suwannee River bordering the park, the park hosts over 25 events throughout the year. The park offers multiple stages, miles of trails, areas for camping and hiking, canoe and kayak rentals on the river, horseback riding, a restaurant, and a country store. The park is home to multiple species of flora and fauna, and includes a large bat house which has become a home to an increasing number of bats.

Improvements have been made to the park to enhance and improve its entertainment, hiking, canoeing, camping, and other activities. The park offers varied camping options including primitive camping, RV camping, and furnished park models. The "Spirit Treehouse" is also available for different occasions and events. In 2015, the park was featured on an episode of "Treehouse Guys", a reality TV show on the DIY Network. The episode, titled "A 100-Year Old Oak Tree", was the most-watched episode of the series, and featured the construction of a new multi-story treehouse built on the banks of the Suwannee River. Jean Carrithers Cornett, considered the park's matriarch,, is featured prominently in the show as she died during the filming. The massive treehouse is now called the "Mother Tree" in her honor, and is open for tours on weekends.

The 2015 Suwannee Hulaween Music Festival had record-breaking attendance for the Spirit of the Suwannee Music Park with 21,000 attendees.
