= The Hip Abduction =

Reggae band

- Origin: St. Petersburg, Florida, USA
- Genres: Reggae; world; dub; indie pop; reggae pop; pop rock
- Years active: 2010–present
- Labels: Ineffable
- Members: David New; Matt Poynter; Chris Powers; Justino Lee Walker; Cody Moore; Dave Johnson
- Past members: Patrick Hernley; Matt Gawlick; Pat Klemawesch; Paul Chlapowski; Kevin Clark
- Website: https://www.thehipabduction.com

The Hip Abduction is an American reggae band from St. Petersburg, Florida, formed in 2010.

== History ==
The founding members of the band, David New and Chris Powers, met in 2007 when they began playing cover songs on the beach in St. Petersburg for $100 and a fish sandwich. The two formed the Hip Abduction in 2010, which Powers said New named after an exercise machine he once noticed while working out at a gym at the University of Virginia.

The Hip Abduction released their debut album One Less Sound on October 28, 2011. They released a self-titled album, The Hip Abduction, on December 3, 2013, which was supported by the single "Children of the Sun". The album's release debuted at #5 on the Billboard Reggae charts and continues to top the iTunes charts. They released their third studio album, Gold Under the Glow, in 2016.

The band has performed at venues across the country, including Red Rocks. From October 24–27, 2019, they attended the annual music festival Suwannee Hulaween in Live Oak, Florida and promoted their then-new album To the Ends of the Earth.

On September 24, 2021, the band released their fifth studio album, A Seafarer and the Infinite Dream. The album tackles topics such as giving the finger to negativity around you, and leaving your soul in California. It contains some of the band's biggest hits, such as "We'll Be Alright" and "Pacific Coast Highway" with Trevor Hall. They released a follow-up album titled Stargazers, Wanderers & Rogues, on June 14, 2024.

== Influences ==
The band is influenced from reggae and West African-influenced music, such as Paul Simon's iconic 1986 album Graceland. They have primarily been influenced from "timeless" artists, such as Van Morrison and the Dave Matthews band.

== Discography ==
=== Studio albums ===
- One Less Sound (2011)
- The Hip Abduction (2013)
- Gold Under the Glow (2016)
- To the Ends of the Earth (2019)
- A Seafarer and the Infinite Dream (2021)
- Stargazers, Wanderers & Rogues (2024)

=== Extended plays ===
- The Zen Sessions (2022)

=== Live albums ===
- THA Live (2018)
- Before the World Stopped (2020)

== Band members ==
- David New: lead vocals, guitar/bass
- Matt Poynter: drums
- Chris Powers: bass
- Justino Lee Walker: guitars
- Cody Moore: saxophone, keyboards
- Dave Johnson: saxophone
