= LPT (band) =

LPT is a 10-piece orchestra, including a four-person horn section, a three-piece percussion section, bass, keyboards, and lead vocals, that delivers salsa dura and Afro-Cuban music that has been likened to such bands as Grupo Fantasma and Bio Ritmo. LPT is known for its high-energy live performances throughout the Southeastern United States. The group has performed at festivals such as the 2019 Savannah Jazz Festival, Hulaween, and Suwannee Rising. They have done live recordings as part of Live from the Studio at NFS Ranch, as well as the Void: Office Music Series. They have opened for such performers as Santana and Trombone Shorty. LPT released a live album entitled El Fonquéte: Live on November 30, 2018, consisting of a mix of original songs, as well as some covers. "Llegamos", a single featuring two songs, was released on October 11, 2019, by Winterland Records. Their debut full-length album, Sin Parar, was released in January 2020. The album was subsequently nominated for two Independent Music Awards–Best Latin Album and Best Latin Song. It won Best Latin Album for 2020. Their video for one of the singles, Los Bravos, received a nomination for Best Music Video at the 2021 San Luis Obispo International Film Festival. On July 31, 2020, the group released a single containing two songs from Sin Parar, one a remix created by DJ Papi Disco.

== History ==
LPT formed in June 2015 in Jacksonville, Florida, with the mission of keeping descarga salsa alive and sharing its ideals of diversity and inclusion with both young newcomers to and old disciples of salsa. The members of the group hail from Cuba, Puerto Rico, Colombia, and the Dominican Republic

=== Members ===
- Josué A. Cruz – Lead vocals (2015–present)
- Angel D. Garcia – Keys, vocals (2015–present)
- Milan Algood – Timbales, vocals (2015–present)
- Jonah Pierre – Bongo, bell (2015–present)
- Juan Carlos Rollan – Tenor sax, vocals (2015–present)
- Juan Pablo Salvat – Congas (2015–present)
- Bryant Patterson – Trombone (2016–present)
- Steve Strawley – Trumpet (2017–present)
- Mike Emmert – Baritone sax (2017–present)
- Stan Piper – Bass (2018–present)

== Discography ==
=== Albums ===
- El Fonquéte: Live (LPT Salsa, 2018)
- Sin Parar (Bold City, 2020)
- Se Quema El Mundo (Bold City, 2021)

== Singles ==
- "Llegamos" (Winterland, 2019)
- "Los Bravos" (Bold City, 2020)

== Awards ==
18th Annual Independent Music Awards

Year	Nominee/work	Award	Results
2020	Sin Parar	Best Latin Album	Won
