= Sila and the Afrofunk Experience =

Band with lead singer Sila Mutungi

Sila and the Afrofunk Experience

Sila and the Afrofunk Experience is an Afrofunk band formed in 2003.

As a child growing up in Kenya, Sila Mutungi discovered Western music through his religious grandmother's radio. He began his musical career with singing original songs in churches. In 1986, he moved to Washington, D.C., ostensibly to attend college (a move partially financed by tribespeople who sold cows to raise tuition money), but instead used the funds to pay for a demo tape to pursue his dreams of a music career. However, the music industry at that time was not interested in an R&B singer with a heavy Kenyan accent.

Ten years later, having relocated to San Francisco, Sila experienced an epiphany during a Baaba Maal concert at The Fillmore. Instead of trying to hide his African heritage to fit into an American paradigm, he decided to embrace it.

He once again started to write music, combining Western influences of such bands as Led Zeppelin, The Beatles, Sly Stone, James Brown, Marvin Gaye and Bob Marley with African influences, among them Maal, Fela Kuti, and Thomas Mapfumo. Calling his new sound “AfroFunk,” he formed Sila and the AfroFunk Experience (Sila and the A.F.E.) in 2003.

The band immediately carved out a niche in the Bay Area's World Music scene, establishing a reputation for their dynamic live performances. In 2004, Sila co-founded the AfroFunk Festival, a showcase for Afro-inspired bands (the proceeds of which benefited humanitarian causes) that evolved into an annual event and tour.

In 2006, Sila and the A.F.E. released their first album, The Funkiest Man in Africa – a reference to Fela Kuti. Afropop.org called the album “a terrific work of contemporary funk” and noted, “Sila’s message… is as strong as the musicianship.”

In 2009, Sila and the A.F.E. performed well-received appearances at the Sierra Nevada World Music Festival and the Stern Grove Festival. Sila and the A.F.E. then released their second album, Black President. As SF Weekly noted, “Sila's concern with the mission of his lyrics is matched by the power of his grooves, an addictive mix of heavy funk, lively Afrobeat, and sun-soaked island rhythms.” Hailed as one of the Top 5 Afropop albums of the year by NPR, "Black President" won the 2009 NAACP Image Award for Outstanding World Music Album (over better-known artists like Zap Mama and Omou Sangare).

In January 2010, Sila announced the next step in his musical journey: a solo album which explores even more of his diverse musical tastes, from Ethiopiques-esque jazz-funk to Afro-rock, Afro-reggae and Afro-Brazilian rhythms. Working the new songs into shape during an open rehearsal residency at SF club Coda, he also found time to headline the “SF Hearts Haiti” benefit at the Independent, which raised over $10,000 for earthquake relief. The as-yet-untitled album is scheduled for summer 2010 release.

== Musical styles ==
Afrofunk (or African Funk) is a musical genre that evolved from afrobeat in the late 1970s and early 1980s. The term "afrofunk" was coined by Fela Kuti's drummer Tony Allen (musician).

After leaving Fela's Africa 70 band, Allen developed a hybrid sound, deconstructing & fusing Afrobeat with electronica, dub, R&B, and rap. Allen refers to this synthesis as afrofunk.

Modern proponents of afrofunk mix afrobeat with 1970s African funk (mainly from Nigeria, Ghana, and Sierra Leone), afropop, jazz, highlife, James Brown style soul-funk, and diverse West African tribal musical traditions.

== Band members ==
Current

- Sila – Vocals (2003–present)
- Khalil Doak-Anthony – Guitar (2010–present)
- Roger Cox – Guitar (2010–present)
- Mike Shiono – Bass (2010–present)
- Bennie Murray – Drum Kit (2008–present)
- Samba Guisse – TALKING DRUM/DJEMBE/SABAR/TAMA/DUNUN (2003–present)
- Andre Webb – Trombone (2003–present)

Past

- Wendell Rand – Bass (2003–2009)
- David James – Guitar (2003–2009)
- Ken House – Guitar (2003–2009)
- Mike Pitre – Trumpet (2003–2009)
- David Boyce – Saxophone Alchemist (2003–2009)

== Discography ==
- Black President (2009)
- Funkiest Man In Africa (2006)
