= Mad Liberation =

Studio album by GRiZ
- Released: 5 September 2012
- Genre: Electronic, funk
- Length: 74:01
- Label: All Good Records
- Producer: GRiZ

GRiZ chronology
End of the World Party (2011)	Mad Liberation (2012)	Rebel Era (2013)

Singles from Mad Liberation
- 1. "Better Than I've Ever Been" Released: July 8, 2011; 2. "Where's the Love" Released: October 23, 2011; 3. "The Future is Now" Released: July 17, 2012; 4. "Smash the Funk" Released: August 29, 2012

Mad Liberation is an album by the electronic musician Grant Kwiecinski, released under the pseudonym GRiZ on 5 September 2012 under the All Good Records. It is his second album after the release of End of the World Party (2011). The album is a collection of songs recorded during 2011/2012. The songs range from original compositions to varied sample works.

== Track listing ==
No.	Title	Length
1.	"Too Young for Tragedy"	7:53
2.	"Smash the Funk"	6:50
3.	"Rock n Roll"	5:06
4.	"Blastaa"	4:29
5.	"Live on Arrival"	5:44
6.	"Where the love"	6:13
7.	"Mr. B" (feat. Dominic Lalli)	5:48
8.	"Fall in Love Too Fast"	4:20
9.	"Better Than I've Ever Been"	6:18
10.	"Wonder Why"	7:41
11.	"The Future Is Now"	6:10
12.	"See You Again"	6:29
Total length:		74:01
