= Say It Loud (Griz album) =

Studio album by GRiZ
- Released: March 31, 2015
- Label: All Good
- Producer: GRiZ

GRiZ chronology
Rebel Era (2013)	Say It Loud (2015)	Good Will Prevail (2016)

Singles from Say It Loud
- 1. "A Fine Way To Die (featuring Orlando Napier)" Released: December 14, 2014; 2. "Stop Trippin' (featuring iDA HAWK)" Released: January 18, 2015; 3. "The Anthem (featuring Mike Avery)" Released: February 19, 2015; 4. "Funk Party" Released: March 8, 2015

Say It Loud is the fourth album by the electronic musician Grant Kwiecinski under the pseudonym GRiZ. It was released on March 31, 2015, under his own label All Good Records.

== Track listing ==
All tracks are written by Grant Kwiecinski unless noted

No.	Title	Writer(s)	Length
1.	"The Anthem" (featuring Mike Avery)		4:49
2.	"Funk Party"		4:51
3.	"Get Down" (featuring Sunsquabi and Manic Focus)		5:34
4.	"Need This" (featuring The Floozies)		4:06
5.	"It’s All Good" (featuring Jessie Arlen)		5:43
6.	"A Fine Way to Die" (featuring Orlando Napier)	Kwiecinski, Orlando Napier	6:40
7.	"For the Love" (featuring Talib Kweli)		4:41
8.	"Stop Trippin'" (featuring iDA HAWK)		3:50
9.	"Headspace (Time Is On Our Side)"		4:20
10.	"Turnin'" (featuring Orlando Napier)		3:24
Total length:			53:13

Bonus Tracks
No.	Title	Length
11.	"Take It High" (featuring Ivan Neville)	4:09
