= Griz (musician) =

American DJ and musician (born 1990)

GRiZ
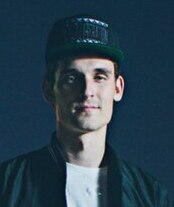
- GRiZ in 2014

Background information
- Born: Grant Kwiecinski; May 31, 1990 (age 36); Southfield, Michigan, U.S.
- Genres: Electronic, trip hop, dubstep, glitch hop, future funk
- Occupations: Producer, DJ, songwriter, saxophone player
- Years active: 2011–present
- Label: All Good Records (formerly Liberated Music)
- Website: www.mynameisgriz.com

Grant Richard Kwiecinski (born May 31, 1990), also known by his stage name GRiZ, is an American DJ, songwriter, and electronic music producer from Southfield, Michigan. He is known for playing the saxophone along with producing funk, electro-soul, and self-described future-funk.

== Early life ==
Kwiecinski was born and raised in Southfield, Michigan, a suburb of Detroit. In elementary school, Kwiecinski was first introduced to the alto sax as well as the piano. After growing up on big horn sounds of funk groups like The Meters, Kwiecinski found himself gravitating towards that influence when he first began making his own music in college. He attended Birmingham Groves High School and then Michigan State University for several years before he dropped out to focus on a music career. It was also during his college years that he had become personally comfortable enough to openly identify as gay. While at Michigan State he would frequently DJ parties at his friends' fraternity houses and play shows in the East Lansing area. GRiZ first became popular with the release of his free debut album, End of the World Party, in 2011. With the release, he ended up supporting bigger artists such as Pretty Lights, Gramatik, and Big Gigantic on their respective tours, eventually leading to his own headlining tour. Following such success, GRiZ released six more albums, Mad Liberation in 2012, Rebel Era in 2013, Say It Loud in 2015, Good Will Prevail in 2016, Ride Waves in 2019, and Rainbow Brain in 2021. Griz currently resides in downtown Denver and Downtown Detroit.

== Career ==
Kwiecinski created the All BAD Records (formerly Liberated Music) label to promote his music, along with electro contemporaries Muzzy Bearr (who also plays guitar live with GRiZ and on several tracks), The Floozies, The Geek x VRV, and Manic Focus. All Good Records describes itself as a label that "reps old school motown soul, future funk, new disco, cutting edge electronica, and anything on the forefront of new sound." Kwiecinski travels across the U.S & Canada playing at festivals such as Summer Camp, Electric Zoo, Electric Forest, Hard Los Angeles, TomorrowWorld, North Coast Festival, Decadence, SnowBall, Lollapalooza and Shambhala. He has collaborated with other artists, including Gramatik, ExMag, and Big Gigantic. His fourth album, Say It Loud, was released on March 31, 2015. In 2016, GRiZ released Good Will Prevail which was his first time charting in the Billboard 200. In 2017, GRiZ released a remixed version of Good Will Prevail, named Good Will Continue. The year 2019 saw the release of his sixth album, Ride Waves, that exhibited a new sound style with more rapping and singing than ever before. During the COVID-19 pandemic, GRiZ turned to live streams held via Instagram, Twitch, and YouTube to continue spreading his music.

12 Days of Grizmas, an annual event hosted by Griz, is intended to generate attention and revenue for non-profits. During the twelve days leading up to his annual two-day festival in Detroit called GRiZMAS, all proceeds generated from events are donated to a variety of charities, and fans are often rewarded for their participation.

== Griztronics ==
Griztronics, stylized as GRiZTRONICS, is a collaboration of GRiZ and Subtronics that began in 2019.

Works include "Griztronics" (2019) on Bangers[2].Zip

Performances include Outside Lands 2026.

== GRiZFam and Liberators ==
The GRiZFam started out as a way for fans of GRiZ to connect with each other through music, pictures, and other associated art. Liberators are the street team for GRiZ, and help raise awareness for shows, spread the music, as well as help with charitable organizations. The fans work by the mantra that GRiZ popularized: Show Love, Spread Love.

== Awards, nominations and accomplishments ==
In 2013, GRiZ made top reviews in publications such as Detroit Music Magazine, SPIN, and The Untz, who put GRiZ as the "#1 Breakout Artist of 2013." At the 2015 High Times Cannabis Cup in Denver, Colorado GRiZ won the People's Choice Flower category for the strain GRiZ Kush created in collaboration with Native Roots Apothecary.

In December 2015, GRiZ, The Liberators and All Good Records were awarded the 'Spirit of Detroit' for the 12 Days of GRiZMAS campaign that raised over $30,000 for Little Kids Rock. The initiative found the Boulder-based artist leading a 12-day series of charitable activities in his hometown, from collecting coats for the homeless and bringing supplies to dog shelters to spreading Christmas cheer throughout the economically depressed city via free shows, industry panels and a "Night Before GRiZMAS" benefit warehouse concert.

== Discography ==
- End of the World Party (2011)
- Mad Liberation (2012)
- Rebel Era (2013)
- Say it Loud (2015)
- Good Will Prevail (2016)
- Ride Waves (2019)
- Rainbow Brain (2021)
- Future Funk: Volume 1 (2026)
