= Rebel Era =

Studio album by GRiZ
- Released: 15 October 2013
- Genre: EDM, nu-funk, dubstep, big beat
- Length: 55:42
- Label: All Good Records
- Producer: GRiZ

GRiZ chronology
Mad Liberation (2012)	Rebel Era (2013)	Say It Loud (2015)

Singles from Rebel Era
- 1. "Gettin' Live" Released: April 4, 2013; 2. "Hard Times" Released: October 12, 2013

Rebel Era is the third album by the electronic musician Grant Kwiecinski, released under the pseudonym GRiZ on 15 October 2013 under the All Good Records. The album is a collection of tracks made during 2012-13. On his blog Kwiecinski states the current global events was the biggest source inspiration for the album.

== Track listing ==
No.	Title	Length
1.	"Gettin' Live"	7:28
2.	"Hard Times"	5:26
3.	"Feel the Love"	6:13
4.	"Dtw to Dia (The Travels of Mr. B)"	5:31
5.	"Simple" (feat. The Floozies)	4:57
6.	"Dance with Me"	5:14
7.	"Do My Thang"	2:11
8.	"Too Young for Tragedy Pt. II"	7:39
9.	"Crime in the City"	5:38
10.	"Keep the Dream Alive"	9:01
11.	"How It Ends" (feat. Dominic Lalli)	3:52
Total length:		1:03:38
