= Franc Moody =

English band

- Origin: London, England
- Genres: Disco; funk; dance-pop
- Labels: Juicebox Recordings; House of FM; Night Time Stories
- Members: Ned Franc; Jon Moody
- Website: francmoody.com

Franc Moody are a musical duo from London, England. The band consists of Ned Franc and Jon Moody.

Their first EP Dance Moves was released in 2018, their first album Dream In Colour was released in 2020. In 2021, an EP titled House of FM followed. On 2 September 2022, they released a new studio album titled "Into the Ether". Their third studio album 'Chewing The Fat' was released on 7 March 2025 via Night Time Stories.

== Record Label ==
Franc Moody's early recordings and first two albums were released by Juicebox Recordings, the label run by their managers Adam Callan and Becky Tong. In 2023 Franc Moody founded their own record label called House of FM. In 2024 Franc Moody signed to Night Time Stories for their third studio album 'Chewing The Fat'.

== Musical influences ==
Franc Moody cite Daft Punk, James Brown and Jamiroquai as musical influences.

== Discography ==
=== Studio albums ===
- Dream In Colour (2020)
- Into The Ether (2022)
- Chewing The Fat (2025)

=== EPs ===
- Dance Moves (2018)
- House of FM (2021)
