= Zogsports =

American adult co-ed sports league

ZogSports

ZogSports is an adult intramural co-ed sports league, with operations in New York City, New Jersey, Washington, DC, Atlanta, San Francisco, and Los Angeles.

== Overview ==
ZogSports offers weekly, recreational co-ed sports leagues including basketball, bocce, bowling, cornhole, dodgeball, football, floor hockey, kickball, skeeball, soccer, softball, ultimate, volleyball, and wiffle ball. At the end of every season, small financial donations are made to charities designated by winning teams. As of March 2015, over $2,611,440 have been donated to teams' charities.

== History ==
ZogSports was founded in 2002 by Robert Herzog, after he survived the September 11 attacks. Herzog worked on the 96th floor of the World Trade Center's North Tower as a vice president of operations for Marsh & McLennan. Herzog says he was inspired by the altruism he witnessed after the attacks and decided to incorporate charity as a major component of ZogSports. In its first season, ZogSports had 500 participants. As of June 2014, ZogSports has over 115,000 annual participants, making it the largest co-ed, recreational sports league in the United States.

During the unprecedented hardships of the 2020 COVID outbreak, they took advantage of a policy in order to not refund people's money for the seasons they had already paid for but were unable to participate in. This led to many complaints to the Better Business Bureau.

== Recognitions ==
ZogSports was listed in Inc. 5000's America's Fastest-Growing Companies in 2011 and 2012. ZogSports was recognized by Crain's New York in 2014 as one of the Best Places to Work in New York City.
