= Gramatik =

Slovenian electronic music producer

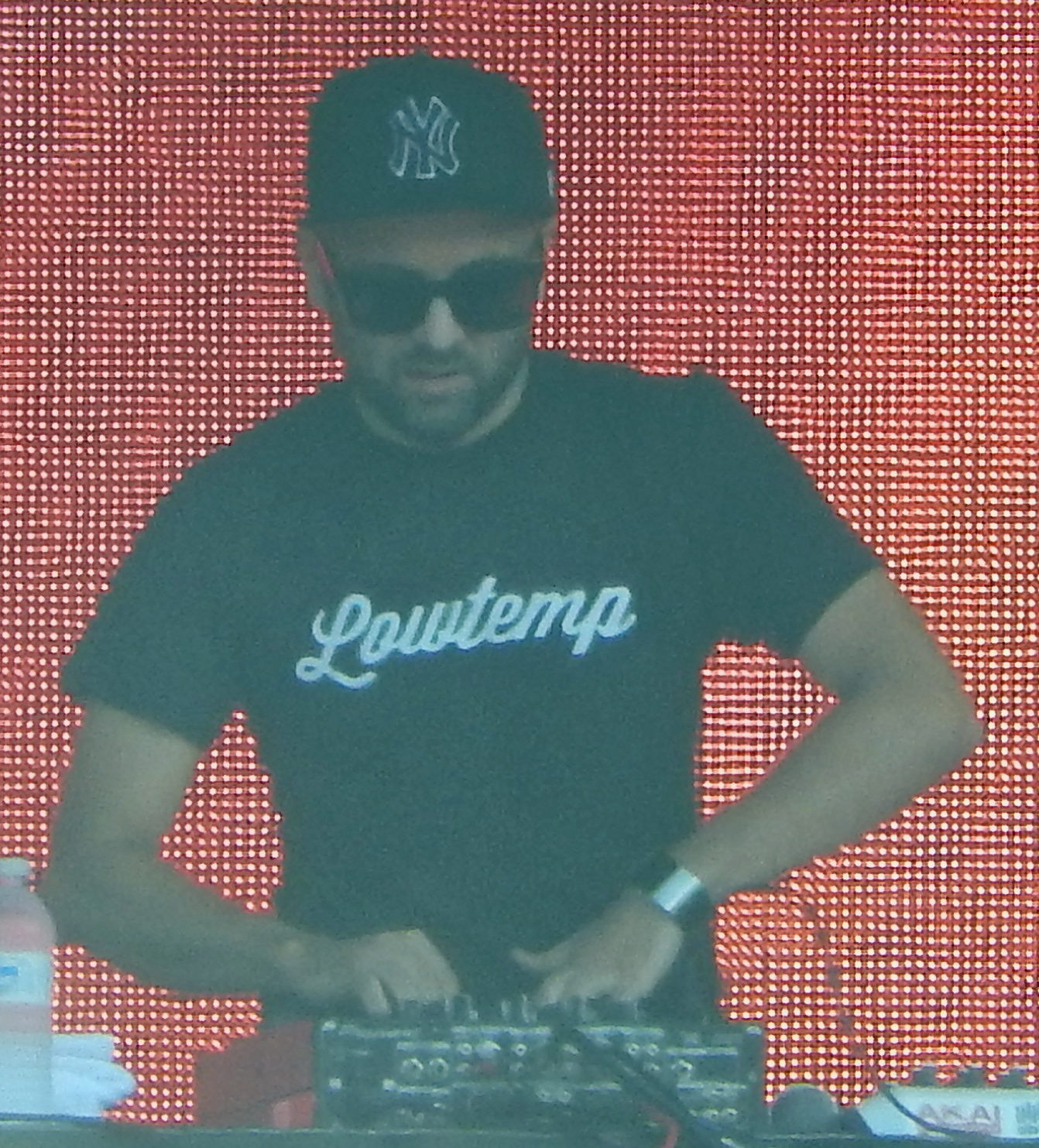
- Gramatik in 2014

Background information
- Also known as: Gramatik
- Born: Denis Jašarević; October 19, 1984 (age 41); Portorož, SR Slovenia, Yugoslavia
- Genres: Chill-out; hip hop; electronica; trip hop
- Occupations: Record producer, songwriter
- Years active: 2008–present
- Labels: Pretty Lights Music; Cold Busted; Lowtemp
- Website: www.gramatik.net

Denis Jašarević (born 19 October 1984), known by his stage name Gramatik, is a Slovenian electronic music producer, originally from Portorož, Slovenia. He currently resides in New York City.

== Early life ==
Denis Jašarević was born in Portorož, SR Slovenia, SFR Yugoslavia on 19 October 1984. Jašarević’s interest in music began at the age of three, when his mother would catch him listening to American funk, jazz, soul and blues from his older sister’s cassette tapes. As he got older, he was introduced to hip hop culture and listened to artists such as DJ Premier, Guru, RZA and Dr. Dre.

== Career ==
At the age of 13, Jašarević started producing hip-hop music using an early PC. He later began sharing his tracks through the online music store Beatport, which helped him gain a following in the United States and Europe. Beatport is what Jašarević cites as his gateway to emerging as an electronic artist and landing his first US agent, Hunter Williams.

After Jašarević signed with his new agency, he moved to New York City and released his debut studio album Expedition 44 in July 2008, as well as his second studio album Street Bangerz Vol. 1 in December 2008. SB1 charted on Beatport's Top 100 Chill Out chart for six months. In an interview with Britt Chester, Jašarević said, "I didn't even expect the album to sell one track on Beatport, nothing else was sold on beatport except techno and house. When I dropped my album and it started selling, I was really surprised, since I'd never seen a hip-hop album sell on Beatport. So when it sold, I was like 'Wow!' These were hip-hop beats, but it was labeled 'Chill Out' on Beatport. People saw it and thought it was awesome good chill out music, which is fine for me. I didn't expect it at all, and I didn't expect someone to reach out to me as a booking agent."

A year after releasing his first album, Jašarević signed to the Pretty Lights Music label as its first new artist, which at the time consisted of only the electronic music producer Pretty Lights (Derek Vincent Smith). The label utilizes a fee-free music model, and Jašarević has stated his belief is that it is "morally right for music to be primarily free", and has been vocal about his history with digital piracy and how it has benefited his career in multiple ways. Jašarević cited his third extended play (EP) #digitalfreedom as having a theme involving "the fight against severe internet censorship bills" such as ACTA, SOPA and PIPA.

In 2013, Jašarević announced his departure from the Pretty Lights Music label in order to form his own vanity record label named Lowtemp Recordings. The label's name is an abbreviation of "low temperature", which Jašarević has explained is meant to indicate that music from his label would be "cool", stating, "So from now on, if you think a song of mine is cool, you gotta say that shit's [from] Lowtemp." Lowtemp now consists of artists Exmag (a side project of Gramatik), ILLUMNTR, Gibbz, BRANX, and Russ Liquid. In 2014, Jašarević reissued his first seven albums—including the Street Bangerz series, renamed as SB—on the Lowtemp label with new or updated artwork.

On November 9, 2017, Gramatik launched his own cryptocurrency, GRMTK, and raised the maximum amount of $2.48 million (7500 ETH) in under 24 hours during his GRMTK token sale in Zurich. He was among the first artists to 'tokenize' his intellectual property.

== Accolades ==
- Three "Best Track" awards - Beatport Music Awards (2012)
- Nomination for "Best Chill Out Artist" - Beatport Music Awards (2010)

== Discography ==
=== Studio albums ===
- Expedition 44 (2008) (reissued 2014)
- Street Bangerz Vol. 1 (2008) (reissued 2014 as SB1)
- Street Bangerz Vol. 2 (2009) (reissued 2014 as SB2)
- Street Bangerz Vol. 3 (2010) (reissued 2014 as SB3)
- No Shortcuts (2010) (reissued 2014)
- Beatz & Pieces Vol. 1 (2011) (reissued 2014)
- Street Bangerz Vol. 4 (2013) (reissued 2014 as SB4)
- The Age of Reason (2014)
- Epigram (2016)
- Street Bangerz Vol. 5 (2018)
- Re: Coil Deluxe (2020)
- Cyberpunk 2020 OST (2020)

=== Extended plays ===
- Dreams About Her (2008) (reissued 2014)
- Water 4 The Soul (2009) (reissued 2014)
- #digitalfreedom EP (2012) (reissued 2015)
- Re:Coil Part I EP (2017)
- Water 4 The Soul II (2020)

=== Singles ===
- "You Don't Understand" (2013)
- "Brave Men" (2014)
- "Hit That Jive" (2014)
- "Native Son" (2016)
- "Voyager Twins" (2017)
- "Recovery" (2017)
- "Puff Your Cares Away" (2019)
- "Better Believe It Now" (with Big Gigantic) (2019)
- "Requiem for Peace" (with Anomalie featuring Waka Flocka Flame and Chrishira Perrier) (2019)
- "Bring it Up" (2022)
- "Still doin' it" (2022)
- I'm A Problem (feat. Redman) (2025) with Jayceeoh, 1000volts, Redman

=== Compilations ===
- Coffee Shop Selection (2015)
