= Big Gigantic =

American musical duo

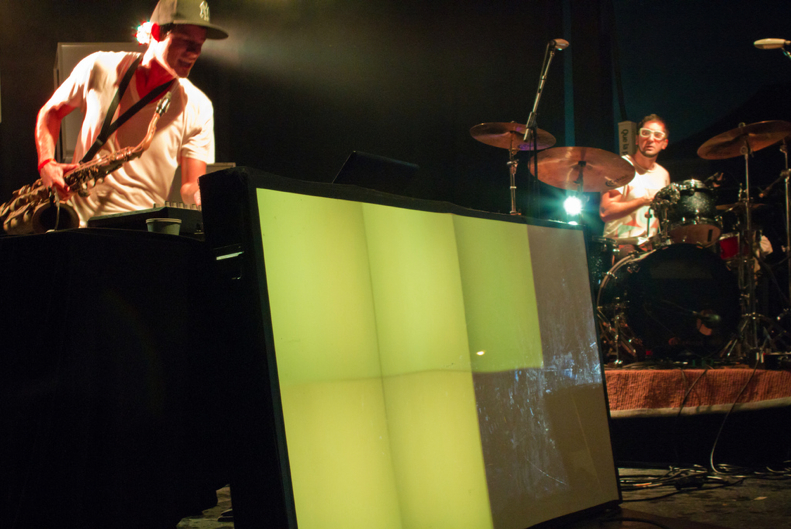
- Big Gigantic performing in 2011

Background information
- Origin: Boulder, Colorado, U.S.
- Genres: Electronica, livetronica, EDM, hip hop, jazz
- Members: Dominic Lalli (saxophone, DJ, producer); Jeremy Salken (drums)
- Website: www.biggigantic.net

Big Gigantic are an American instrumental electronic hip hop and jazz musical duo based in Boulder, Colorado.

The band has played at a wide range of music festivals, including Coachella Valley Music and Arts Festival, Lollapalooza, Ultra Music Festival, Hangout Music Festival, Austin City Limits, Governors Ball Music Festival, Newport Jazz Festival, Electric Forest Festival, Outside Lands and Bonnaroo, among others. Since 2012, Big Gigantic has sold out their festival Rowdytown at Red Rocks Amphitheatre each September in Morrison, Colorado.

Big Gigantic has toured the United States and has played live shows in Europe, South America, and Asia.

== Releases ==
In 2016, Big Gigantic released their album Brighter Future, with tracks featuring hip hop artists including Waka Flocka Flame and Logic, singers Jennifer Hartswick, Rozes, Angela McCluskey and Natalie Cressman, as well as collaborations with GRiZ and Cherub. The album debuted at number two on the Billboard Dance/Electronic Albums chart.

On February 28, 2020, Big Gigantic released their seventh album Free Your Mind, with a 26-date tour beginning in March.

== Side projects ==
Gigantic Underground Conspiracy

The duo are part of jam band/electronica supergroup Gigantic Underground Conspiracy, composed of members from Big Gigantic, the Disco Biscuits, and Underground Orchestra. .

Big Grizmatik

The duo are part of Big Grizmatik, together with GRiZ and Gramatik.

== Members ==
- Dominic Lalli – saxophone/DJ/producer
- Jeremy Salken – drums

Lalli holds a master's degree from the Manhattan School of Music, and Salken has been a touring musician, including with the Victor Barnes Bluegrass Band, which is currently on hiatus.

== Discography ==
Studio albums

- Fire It Up (1320 Records, 2009)
- Wide Awake (1320 Records, 2009)
- A Place Behind the Moon (1320 Records, 2010)
- Nocturnal (1320 Records, 2012)
- The Night Is Young (Big Gigantic Records, 2014)
- Brighter Future (Big Gigantic Records, 2016)
- Brighter Future Remixed (Big Gigantic Records, 2017)
- Brighter Future Deluxe (Big Gigantic Records, 2017)
- Free Your Mind (Counter Records, 2020)
- Brighter Future 2 (Big Gigantic Records, 2022)
- Fluorescence (Big Gigantic Records, 2025)

Extended plays

- Leisure Season (2021)

Singles

- "The World Is Yours" (2011)
- "Power" (with Griz) (2012)
- "Colorado Mountain High" (2013)
- "Love Letters" (feat. Sabina Sciubba) (2014)
- "Funk With Me & Funk With Me VIP" (with Snails) (2015)
- "Good Times Roll" (with Griz) (2015)
- "Get On Up" (2015)
- "$4,000,000" (Steve Aoki and Bad Royale featuring Ma$e and Big Gigantic) (2017)
- "Better Believe It Now" (with Gramatik) (2019)
- "You're the One" (featuring Nevve) (2019)
- "Friends" (2019) (featuring Ashe)
- "Where I Wanna Be" (2019)
- "Burning Love" (2020)
- "St. Lucia" (2020)
- "I Can Feel It" (2021)
- "Daily Routine" (GRiZ featuring Big Giganic and Probcause) (2021)
- "Open Your Mind" (with GRiZ) (2022)

Remixes

- The Knocks — "Ride or Die" (feat. Foster the People) (Big Gigantic Remix) (2018)
- Petit Biscuit — "Parachute" (Big Gigantic Remix) (2021)
