= Starfall =

Starfall or Star Falls, may refer to:

== Astronomy, meteorology ==
- meteor shower, or, starfall
- falling star, or, starfall, or meteor

== Places ==
- Star Falls, Caldron Linn (Idaho), USA; a waterfall on the Snake River
- Star Falls, Ravalli County, Montana, USA; a waterfall; see List of waterfalls in Montana

=== Fictional locations ===
- Starfall, a fictional planet, the setting of the 2006 Doctor Who novel The Resurrection Casket
- Starfall, a fictional location from the 2006 Marie Brennan novel Doppelganger
- Starfall, a fictional location in the World of A Song of Ice and Fire by G.R.R. Martin
- Starfall Islands, a fictional location from the 2022 videogame Sonic Frontiers
- Starfall Street, a fictional location from the 2022 videogame Pokémon Scarlet and Violet
- Starfall Tower, a fictional location from the Japanese manga serial comic How Not to Summon a Demon Lord

== People ==
- Cindy Starfall, pornographic film actress and model

=== Fictional characters ===
- Chap Starfall, a fictional character from the 1993 TV show Wild Palms
- Proxima Starfall, a fictional character from the 2017 TV show Mysticons

== Games ==
- Starfall (board game), from Yaquinto, 1979
- Starfall (Star Wars: The Roleplaying Game), published by West End Games in 1989
- Starfall Online, an MMO RTS videogame
- Starfall, a 2011 videogame by Digital Concepts; see List of Mac games
- Starfall, a play-by-mail game; see List of play-by-mail games
- Star Falls, a VIC-20 videogame from Cascade Games; rereleased on the Cassette 50, 1983

== Music ==
=== Albums ===
- Starfall (album), by Dragonland, 2004
- Zvezdopad (Russian: Звездопад, romanized: Zvezdopad, lit. 'Starfall'), by Grazhdanskaya Oborona, 2002
- The Star Falls (EP), by River Tiber (musician), 2013

=== Songs ===
- "Star Fall", a song by Supercar from the album Futurama, 2000
- Starfall (Russian: Звездопад, romanized: Zvezdopad), a song by Grazhdanskaya Oborona from the eponymous album Zvezdopad (Starfall), 2002
- "Starfall", a song by Dragonland from the eponymous album Starfall, 2004
- "Star Falls" (Russian: Звездопад), a song by Albert Asriyan, 2006
- "Starfall", a song by DJ Fresh from the album Kryptonite, 2010
- "Starfall", a song by Michal Menert from the album Dreaming of a Bigger Life, 2010
- "Starfall", a song by Kryptos from the album The Coils of Apollyon, 2012
- "Starfall", a song by Salem from the album Fires in Heaven, 2020
- "Starfall", a song by Tia Ray, 2020
- "Starfall", a single by A Dark Halo, 2019

== Literature ==
- Starfall (website), a website that teaches children how to read and write
- "Starfall", a 2009 novella in the Xeelee Sequence by Stephen Baxter
- Starfall, a 1960 novel by John W. Cunningham
- Star Fall, a 1980 novel by David Bischoff
- Starfall, a 1995 Star Trek novel by Brad and Barbara Strickland; see List of Star Trek: The Next Generation novels
- Starfall, a 1999 novel in the Deathlands series by James Axler
- Starfall: Phaeton and the Chariot of the Sun, a 2004 novel by Michael Cadnum
- Star Fall, a 2014 novel by Cynthia Harrod-Eagles
- Starfall, a 2015 novel by Brenda Hiatt
- Star Fall, a 2016 novel by Dean Wesley Smith
- Starfall, a 2017 novel by Melissa Landers
- Starfall, a 1974 biography of Gus Grissom by Betty Grissom
- Starfall, a 2005 collection of poems by Wes Magee
- "A Star Falls" (Japanese: 星堕ちる, romanized: Hoshi Ochiru), serially published chapter 73 of the Japanese serial manga comic Ichi the Witch
- "Starfall: Beyond the Finisher" (Japanese: 星落とし：必殺の先へ, romanized: Hoshi otoshi: hissatsu no saki e), serially published chapter 156 of the Japanese serial manga comic Shangri-La Frontier; see List of Shangri-La Frontier chapters
- "Starfall" (Japanese: 降星, romanized: Kōsei), serially published chapter 1110 of the Japanese serial manga comic One Piece; see List of One Piece chapters (1016–current)

== Television ==
- Star Falls, an American comedy television series, 2018
- "Starfall", a 1960 TV episode of the American TV show Outlaws (1960 TV series)
- Mermicorno: Starfall, a 2025 TV show made by Atomic Cartoons for HBO

== Other uses ==
- Starfall (film) (Russian: Звездопад), a 1981 Soviet film
- "Starfall", a 2010 Doctor Who radioplay by Paul Magrs
- Unmanned Systems Battalion "Starfall", 14th Chervona Kalyna Brigade, National Guard of Ukraine
- SpaceX Starfall, a reentry capsule for returning materiel from orbit in space manufacturing
