= Zvezdopad (disambiguation) =

Zvezdopad is an album by the Russian punk band Grazhdanskaya Oborona.

Zvezdopad (Звездопад, 'Starfall') may also refer to:

- "Zvezdopad", a track from the album Zvezdopad
- "Zvezdopad" a song by Albert Asriyan
- "Zvezdopad", song by Timati
- Zvezdopad, Russian title of the 1981 Soviet film Starfall

== See also ==
- Starfall (disambiguation)
