= Cloudchord =

American music producer and musician

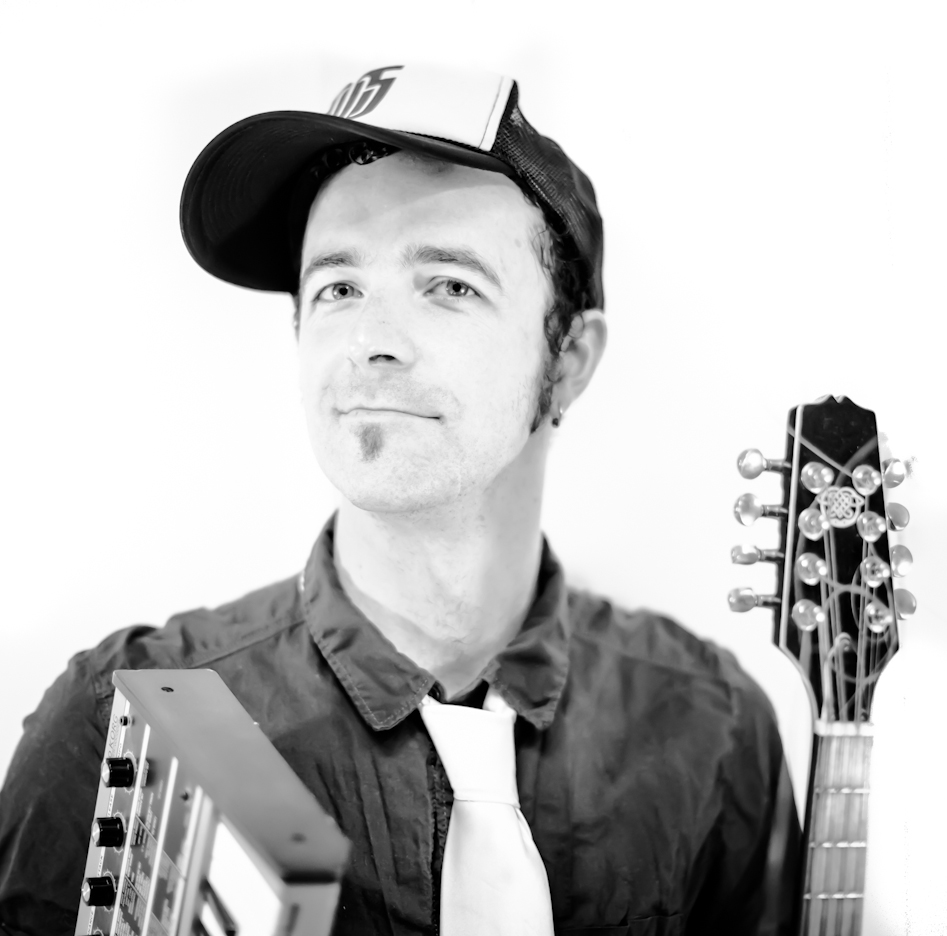

Background information
- Also known as: D.V.S*
- Born: Derek VanScoten
- Origin: Northeastern United States
- Genres: electronic, downtempo
- Occupations: Guitarist, producer
- Years active: 2009-present
- Labels: DVS Music, Pretty Lights, 1320 Records, Loci Records, Soulection
- Website: cloudchord.net

Derek VanScoten, known professionally as Cloudchord, is an American music producer, multi-instrumentalist and electronic musician. Based in Austin, Texas, he has been actively releasing solo material since 2009. In 2011, under the moniker D.V.S*, he released an official remix of Break Science featuring Talib Kweli, and in 2012 he was a featured guitarist and co-producer on Michal Menert's album Even If It Isn't Right.

He has played guitar and other instruments with groups including the Boulder Philharmonic, DJ Logic, and Devotchka, and toured with Big Gigantic, Beats Antique, Emancipator, and Lotus. D.V.S* has performed Live PA sets at the American music festivals Camp Bisco, Lightning in a Bottle, Gathering of the Vibes, SXSW, and the 2013 Wakarusa Music and Camping Festival. He scored the Sundance 2015 film In Football We Trust.

== Early life, education ==
Derek VanScoten grew up in the Northeastern United States, and also lived for a time in Nashville, Tennessee, Boulder, Colorado, Brooklyn, and Austin, Texas. He spent his youth playing classic rock songs with friends in bars, and attended college to learn classical guitar and music production.

== Music career ==
=== Releases ===
VanScoten started his music career as a producer and guitarist. He began releasing music as a solo artist in early 2009, melding live guitar with electronic music. His debut solo album Before i sing... was self-released on October 20, 2009. His tracks and albums have since been released by labels and publications including Electronic Musician Magazine, Soulection, Loci Records, 1320 Records, Pretty Lights Music, Cantora, and Dub Lab. VanScoten's songs have also been included on compilation albums such as Emancipator Remixes in 2011.

VanScoten self-released a 30-song solo LP Coming Up for Air in 2011. Coming Up For Air was released as a double-album with two volumes. According to a review in Earmilk, "Volume 1 (DUSK) showcases 15 dancefloor oriented jams in styles of hip hop, dubstep, electrofunk, and moombaton. Volume 2 (dawn) illuminates the more relaxed side of D.V.S*, with several guest musicians spread out over 15 introspective downtempo tracks."

In December 2011 he released an official remix of Break Science. Titled "The Alliance," it featured Talib Kweli. In April 2012, he was a featured guitarist and co-producer on Michal Menert's album Even If It Isn't Right via the Pretty Lights Music Label.

In 2012 a 5-song solo EP titled The Code was released on Daly City Records. Relix Magazine published an interview with VanScoten in June, 2012. He spent much of 2012 teaching classes on Ableton throughout the United States.

His solo album Hit the Clouds Running was released in April 2013, on Gravitas Recordings. According to DubEra, "Hit The Clouds Running is quite possibly one of the best releases [of 2013]. That’s a bold statement, but the song-by-song switch up of genres that producer Derek VanScoten has put in to this album is noteworthy."

=== Live performances ===
He has played a variety of instruments with groups including the Boulder Philharmonic, DJ Logic, and Devotchka. VanScoten has toured under the moniker D.V.S.* with artists including Big Gigantic, Beats Antique, Emancipator, Tycho, Cherub, EOTO, Tipper, and Lotus.

D.V.S* has performed Live PA sets at the American music festivals Camp Bisco, Lightning in a Bottle, and music venues Irving Plaza, Fox Theatre (Boulder, Colorado) and the Chapel of Sacred Mirrors with painter Alex Grey. Others festivals include Sonic Bloom, Gathering of the Vibes, SXSW, and the 2013 Wakarusa Music and Camping Festival.

=== Name change ===
In 2015, he elected to change his producer name from D.V.S* to Cloudchord in order to "leave a clear and colorful legacy."

== Personal life ==
VanScoten is based in Austin, Texas.

== Discography ==
=== Solo albums ===
List of studio and live albums
| Year | Album title | Release details |
|---|---|---|
| 2009 | Before i sing | Released: Oct 20, 2009; Label: self-released |
| 2010 | Beyond the Looking Glass EP | Released: May 19, 2010; Label: self-released |
| 2010 | How It Ends: The Remix EP | Released: 2010; Label: self-released |
| 2011 | Coming Up For Air | Released: Nov 1, 2011; Label: self-released |
| 2012 | The Code EP | Released: 2012; Label: Daly City Records |
| 2013 | Hit the Clouds Running | Released: April 12, 2013; Label: Gravitas Recordings |

=== Singles and remixes ===
- 2010: "Out on the Sandbar"
- 2010: "The Newell and Doran Mix"
- 2011: "The Alliance" - official Break Science remix ft. Talib Kweli
- 2011: "Sun/Shadow" by Michal Menert
- 2011: "Jet Stream" by Emancipator
- 2011: "The End"
- 2012: "Us and Them"
- 2013: "Because Remix"
- 2013: "On and On" by Sharam
- 2014: "So Butterfly" off Noise Vs. Beauty by Bassnectar
- 2014: "Comfort Zone" (Loci Records)

=== Production/performance credits ===
Incomplete list of credits for Derek VanScoten
| Yr | Release title | Primary artist(s) | Role |
|---|---|---|---|
| 2011 | Emancipator Remixes | Loci Records | mandolin/guitar on track "Dusk To Dawn" |
| 2012 | Even If It Isn't Right | Michal Menert | Featured guitarist, co-producer |
