= Filling Up the City Skies =

Filling Up The City Skies

Studio album by Pretty Lights
- Released: October 30, 2008
- Recorded: 2007–2008
- Genre: Electronica, hip hop
- Length: 2:37:38
- Label: Pretty Lights Music
- Producer: Derek Vincent Smith

Pretty Lights chronology
Taking Up Your Precious Time (2006)	Filling Up The City Skies (2008)	Passing by Behind Your Eyes (2009)

Filling Up The City Skies is the second studio album by the American electronic music producer Pretty Lights, released on October 30, 2008 by Pretty Lights Music. It is a double album as well as the first album released after Michal Menert's departure from the project, leaving Derek Vincent Smith as the only one left to continue the project. Because of this, the album cover reads "Derek Vincent Smith of Pretty Lights" since Michal Menert was not present during the production of the album. The album's artwork features the skyline of the Minneapolis, Minnesota superimposed over the skyline of Hong Kong. The original release included an additional track, "Speaking of Happiness", which was later removed for copyright reasons.

== Track listing ==
Filling Up The City Skies

Disc One (1:18:05)
No.	Title	Length
1.	"Change Is Gonna Come"	6:11
2.	"The Time Has Come"	6:04
3.	"My Other Love"	6:03
4.	"Cold Feeling"	6:31
5.	"Solamente"	6:37
6.	"Fill Your Eyes"	4:53
7.	"Something's Wrong"	7:07
8.	"Evening Sun"	6:43
9.	"Double Love"	3:00
10.	"Pop Quiz"	6:09
11.	"At Last I Am Free"	5:21
12.	"Make You Feel"	3:50
13.	"Summer's Gone"	4:39
14.	"Maybe Tomorrow"	5:04

Disc Two (1:19:33)
No.	Title	Length
1.	"How We Do"	3:46
2.	"Hot Like Sauce"	7:01
3.	"Who Loves Me"	6:08
4.	"More Important Than Michael Jordan"	8:37
5.	"If I Gave You My Love"	4:36
6.	"Aimin At Your Head"	4:31
7.	"B-Rock"	5:37
8.	"Take The Sun Away"	10:34
9.	"Up & Down I Go"	7:54
10.	"Electro Cali"	7:43
11.	"Finally Moving Remix"	7:34
