= Bring Me the Head of Kyle Bobby Dunn =

Bring Me The Head Of

Studio album by Kyle Bobby Dunn
- Released: June 25, 2012
- Recorded: 2007–2011
- Genres: Ambient, drone
- Length: 2:01:45
- Label: Low Point
- Producer: Kyle Bobby Dunn

Bring Me The Head of Kyle Bobby Dunn is a full length double album from Canadian composer Kyle Bobby Dunn. It was recorded at Bunce Cake studios in Brooklyn and remote parts of Canada. The compositions are mostly long, slowly evolving minimal works created from electric guitar processing. The album is his second double album since 2010's Low Point release, A Young Person's Guide to Kyle Bobby Dunn.

The album was remastered in 2021 by Maryam Sirvan and Milad Bagheri who worked on the 2019 album, From Here to Eternity. It was reissued and released in a limited triple vinyl pressing by Paris, France based Diggers Factory and the remastered collection was made available digitally everywhere.

== Critical reception ==
Professional ratings
Review scores
| Source | Rating |
|---|---|
| Norman Records | 5/5 stars |
| AllMusic | 4/5 stars |
| Resident Advisor | 4/5 stars |

James Catchpole of A Closer Listen praised the album, writing:

Its magnificence convinces me that it is one of the best ambient drone records of recent times. It perfectly reflects the dream state; of deep sleep and kind dreams, the brilliance of a beaming light glowing onto us and caressing us out of sleep and into an awakening. Kyle Bobby Dunn encourages us to remain forever dreaming. Bon Voyage.

== Track listing ==
Disque Un

1. "Canticle of Votier's Flats" - 1:59
2. "La Chanson de Beurrage" – 14:37
3. "Ending of All Odds" – 4:45
4. "Douglas Glen Theme" – 12:00
5. "An Evening with Dusty" - 8:10
6. "The Hungover" - 12:13
7. "Diamond Cove (And Its Children Were Watching)" - 3:52

Disque Deux

1. "The Troubles with Trés Belles" - 5:56
2. "Innisfal (Rivers of My Fathers) - 7:37
3. "The Calm Idiots of Yesterday" - 10:48
4. "Parkland" - 10:39
5. "Complétia Terrace" - 6:15
6. "In Search of a Poetic Whole" - 7:41
7. "Kotylak" - 8:21
8. "Moitié et Moitié - 7:00
