= Ways of Meaning =

Studio album by Kyle Bobby Dunn
- Released: May 23, 2011
- Recorded: 2010
- Genre: Ambient, Drone
- Length: 39:05
- Label: Desire Path Recordings
- Producer: Kyle Bobby Dunn, James Plotkin, James Hicken

Kyle Bobby Dunn chronology
A Young Person's Guide to Kyle Bobby Dunn (2010)	Ways of Meaning (2011)	Bring Me the Head of Kyle Bobby Dunn (2012)

Ways of Meaning is a studio album by Canadian composer Kyle Bobby Dunn. It was released on May 23, 2011, through Desire Path Recordings on vinyl, digital download, and in a limited art edition.

== Background ==
Unlike Dunn's earlier double album A Young Person's Guide to Kyle Bobby Dunn, this release features shorter pieces, most under ten minutes in length. The compositions were primarily created with guitar, laptop, and organ, alongside subtle use of strings, choir, horns, and sampled textures.

== Reception ==
Ways of Meaning was met with favorable reviews from music critics.

Professional ratings
Review scores
Source	Rating
PopMatters	8/10 stars
AllMusic	3.5/5 stars
Beats Per Minute	79%
Consequence	3.9/5
Pitchfork	7.1/10

- Pitchfork described the record as “gentle, enveloping ambient music” and rated it 7.1 out of 10.
- Consequence of Sound called it “haunting and meditative,” giving it a 3.9/5 score.
- PopMatters awarded it 8/10, noting its “austere yet powerful quality.”
- Beats Per Minute gave the album a 79%, citing “Canyon Meadows” and “Movement for the Completely Fucked” as highlights.
- AllMusic rated it 3.5/5, with reviewer Ned Raggett praising its mix of “bass-heavy rumble and gossamer glaze.”

NPR featured the track Movement for the Completely Fucked on All Songs Considered, stating that "The 15-minute piece glacially increases in volume without leaning on a climax, as most drone musicians are wont to do, instead choosing to brood with shimmering brilliance."

== Track listing ==
Side A

1. "Dropping Sandwiches (In Chester Lake)" – 3:54
2. "Statuit" – 5:32
3. "Canyon Meadows" – 7:03
4. "New Pures" – 4:06

Side B

1. "Movement for the Completely Fucked" – 14:52
2. "Touhy's Theme" – 5:03
