= The Ways We Separate =

Studio album by Beacon
- Released: April 30, 2013
- Length: 34:56
- Label: Ghostly International
- Producer: Thomas Mullarney III; Jacob Gossett

Beacon chronology
The Ways We Separate (2013)	Escapements (2016)

The Ways We Separate is the debut studio album by Beacon, an American electronic music duo of Thomas Mullarney III and Jacob Gossett. It was released on April 30, 2013, through Ghostly International. It received generally favorable reviews from critics.

== Background ==
Beacon consists of vocalist and producer Thomas Mullarney III and producer Jacob Gossett. They met each other at Pratt Institute during their first week of classes. Beacon's debut EP, No Body, was released in 2011 through Moodgadget. A follow-up EP, For Now, was released in 2012 through Ghostly International. The duo's debut studio album, The Ways We Separate, was released on April 30, 2013, through Ghostly International. A music video was released for the album's song "Drive".

A deluxe art edition of the album comes in a 13" x 13" x 2" cast sugar and epoxy resin object, created by sculptor Fernando Mastrangelo. Limited to 20 copies and priced at $200, featuring the letters "TWWS", the packaging holds a rose-colored vinyl.

Beacon later released The Ways We Separate Remixes (2013), which contains remixes of the album's songs by Kuhrye-oo, No Regular Play, and Fort Romeau.

== Critical reception ==
Professional ratings
Aggregate scores
Source	Rating
Metacritic	67/100
Review scores
Source	Rating
AllMusic	4/5 stars
Consequence	3/5 stars
Exclaim!	8/10
Pitchfork	6.8/10
PopMatters	6/10
Tiny Mix Tapes	2/5 stars

According to the review aggregator Metacritic, The Ways We Separate received "generally favorable reviews" based on a weighted average score of 67 out of 100 from 7 critic scores.

Daniel Sylvester of Exclaim! stated, "On The Ways We Separate, Beacon manage to craft one of the most compelling and authentic-sounding albums of the year, and all it took was the courage to cool it with the R&B part." Andy Kellman of AllMusic stated, "Cunningly sequenced, The Ways We Separate is exceptionally fluid and tightly bound, made for compulsive listening with no weak links." Sasha Geffen of Consequence commented that the album "simmers as bedroom music for troubled couples, grouping R&B and dance music together into a smoky pop hybrid." Trurl of Tiny Mix Tapes stated, "The album's certainly well-produced, occasionally catchy, and at times even soothing in its simplicity, but it can also be dull and uninspired, like something I might put on when I want inoffensive background music for a relaxing social gathering."

== Track listing ==
All lyrics are written by Thomas Mullarney III; all music is composed by Mullarney and Jacob Gossett.

The Ways We Separate track listing
No.	Title	Length
1.	"Bring You Back"	4:16
2.	"Feeling's Gone"	3:13
3.	"Between the Waves"	3:25
4.	"Drive"	3:18
5.	"Overseer"	3:27
6.	"Late November"	1:57
7.	"Studio Audience"	3:37
8.	"Headlights"	2:58
9.	"Anthem"	3:15
10.	"Split in Two"	5:31
Total length:		34:56

Digital edition bonus track
No.	Title	Length
11.	"Feeling's Gone" (extended version)	4:56
Total length:		39:52

== Personnel ==
Credits adapted from liner notes.

- Thomas Mullarney III – vocals, production
- Jacob Gossett – production
- Matt Colton – mastering
- Langdon Graves – illustration
- Michael Cina – typography
