= Brian Coogan =

- Born: October 2, 1979 (age 46)
- Origin: New Orleans, Baton Rouge
- Instruments: voice, Hammond organ, piano, electric piano, synthesizer, electric bass
- Label: none

Brian Coogan is a keyboardist and vocalist from New Orleans, Louisiana.

A versatile musician, Coogan plays in many different contexts and projects, ranging from funk to jazz to rock, including many subgenres within. He is often found as a sideman on gigs with other New Orleanians such as Johnny Vidacovich, Khris Royal, Mike Dillon, and Alex McMurray. A long-time connection with drummer Simon Lott (both grew up in Baton Rouge, Louisiana) has led to many projects that include both of them, notably the now-defunct Maelstrom Trio, with Skerik.

In recent years he has toured nationally as a member of John Ellis & Double-Wide, Maelstrom Trio, Bonerama, Stanton Moore's Trio, and Bobby Previte's Coalition of the Willing. He is a former member of Big Sam's Funky Nation (appearing in the circa 2004 edition), and Galactic-spinoff Good Enough for Good Times. As of August, Coogan has joined Pretty Lights to promote his new album, A Color Map of the Sun and plays keyboard for the new live band in the Analog Future Tour.
