= Taking Up Your Precious Time =

Studio album by Pretty Lights
- Released: October 23, 2006
- Recorded: 2005–2006
- Genre: Electronic
- Length: 73:06
- Label: Pretty Lights Music
- Producer: Derek Vincent Smith; Michal Menert

Pretty Lights chronology
| Taking Up Your Precious Time (2006) | Filling Up the City Skies (2008) |

Taking Up Your Precious Time is the debut studio album by the then-electronic music duo Pretty Lights (Derek Vincent Smith and Michal Menert), released on October 23, 2006, by Pretty Lights Music. It was the only album issued with Menert as part of the project, as he left shortly after its release. The record is known for including the song "Finally Moving" (it samples the song "Something's Got a Hold on Me", a 1962 single from "Etta James Top Ten").

== Track listing ==
| No. | Title | Length |
|---|---|---|
| 1. | "Short Line" | 2:59 |
| 2. | "Until Tomorrow" | 4:36 |
| 3. | "Wrong Platform" | 6:13 |
| 4. | "Finally Moving" | 4:38 |
| 5. | "Stay" | 5:07 |
| 6. | "Summer's Thirst" | 4:22 |
| 7. | "An Empty Station" | 5:42 |
| 8. | "Switch Up" | 3:49 |
| 9. | "Waiting for Her" | 3:00 |
| 10. | "Samso" | 4:22 |
| 11. | "Down the Line" | 5:11 |
| 12. | "Happiness (Troubled Faces)" | 4:44 |
| 13. | "Almost Familiar" | 4:13 |
| 14. | "The Last Passenger" | 4:42 |
| 15. | "Try to Remember" | 9:32 |
