= Kyle Bobby Dunn =

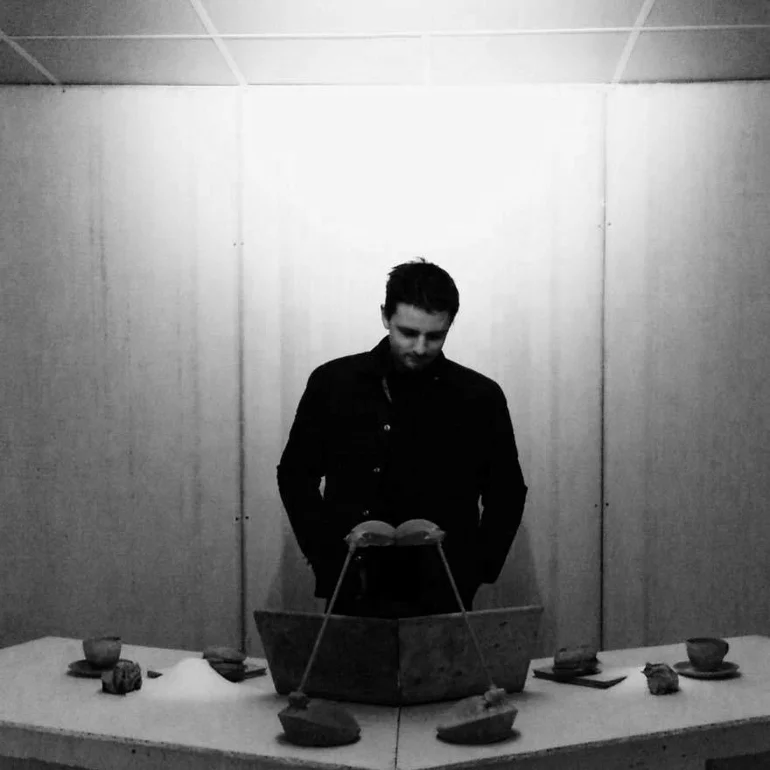

Background information
- Born: Mississauga, Ontario, Canada
- Origin: Calgary, Alberta, Canada
- Genres: Drone; Ambient; Minimalist; Contemporary classical
- Instruments: Guitar, piano, electronics
- Years active: 2002–present
- Label: Sedimental
- Website: kylebobbydunn.bandcamp.com

Kyle Bobby Dunn is a Canadian composer and performer of ambient and drone-based music. His work has been characterized as containing a classical music influence which "operates outside of categories" and is typified by the use of electric guitar, organ and "meticulous post-processing".

His 2019 album From Here to Eternity, a nearly three-hour long work that included collaborations with other artists unlike previous works, was described by Inverted Audio as "an astonishing insight into the imagination of one of contemporary ambient music's most singularly gifted artists". Dunn is known for extended, drone-based compositions. His albums have been reviewed in publications including Pitchfork and Resident Advisor.

== Notable works ==
American label Sedimental originally released Fragments And Compositions Of Kyle Bobby Dunn in spring 2008. Dunn's next album, Fervency was released in 2009.

In 2010, he issued the double album A Young Person's Guide to Kyle Bobby Dunn. This was followed by Ways of Meaning (2011), which combined guitar, organ, and electronic processing in more concise pieces. Dunn released another double album, Bring Me the Head of Kyle Bobby Dunn, in 2012.

His 2014 release, Kyle Bobby Dunn and the Infinite Sadness, expanded his work into a three-hour format. After a five-year hiatus, Dunn returned with From Here to Eternity (2019). In 2025, he released Mixture of Frailties.

== Reviews ==
His work has been described as "compositions that are patience incarnate". The Fanzine noted that one of his albums "captures a mood somewhere between sadness and strength; it's the sound of a respite that occurs after having survived an ordeal; it's sound as memory, as memorial".

Resident Advisor described Kyle Bobby Dunn and the Infinite Sadness as a deeply immersive listening experience, saying that "delicate musical figures" emerge gradually "in a beautiful light", giving the impression of sound that "had always been there and always would be". The review highlighted the tension between the music's sincerity and its humorous or ironic presentation, citing track titles such as "Boring Foothills of Foot Fetishville" and "Variations on a Theme by St. Dipshit". Despite this juxtaposition, the critic concluded that Dunn's approach underscores the genuine emotional weight of the work, calling it "some joyous shit".

Canada's Exclaim! called From Here to Eternity "a masterful articulation of the power of ambient music", covering its expansive 18 tracks and Dunn's ability to uncover "infinitesimal moments of contemplation" within sweeping, long-form drones. The review described the opening of "Boul. Goin" as having "synth drones that sound organic, giving an impression of boundless and serene landscapes,” and compared the album to Aphex Twin's Selected Ambient Works Vol. 2 for its "glimpses of levity".

== Discography ==
Full length releases

- Music for Medication (Ltd. CDR 2002, Housing)
- Music for Medication (CD reissue 2005, This Generation Tapes)
- Applications for Guitar (Ltd. CDR 2006, Housing)
- Fragments & Compositions of Kyle Bobby Dunn (CD 2008, Sedimental; LP 2014, Low Point)
- A Young Person's Guide to Kyle Bobby Dunn (2xCD 2010, Low Point)
- Ways of Meaning (LP/Digital 2011, Desire Path Recordings)
- Bring Me the Head of Kyle Bobby Dunn (2xCD 2012, Low Point; 3xLP 2021, Diggers Factory)
- Kyle Bobby Dunn and the Infinite Sadness (3xLP/2xCD/Digital 2014, Students of Decay; 3xCassette, Crystal Creek)
- From Here to Eternity (4xLP/3xCD/Digital 2019, Past Inside the Present)
- FHTE-B (3xCassette/Digital 2019, Past Inside the Present)
- Selected Ambient Expansion Pack (Digital 2020, self-released)
- Bring Me the Head of Kyle Bobby Dunn (Remastered) (3xLP/Digital 2021, Diggers Factory)
- TCR-P1 (Digital 2021, self-released)
- TCR: Deuxième (Digital 2021, self-released)
- TCR: III (Digital 2021, self-released)
- †CR4 (Digital 2021, self-released)
- WGR (Digital 2022, self-released)
- Sifting Through Nine Layers of Meaning (Digital 2024, self-released)
- Nothing Changes if Nothing Changes (Digital 2024, self-released)
- Mixture of Frailties (Digital 2025, self-released)

EPs & limited editions

- Expanse at Low Levels (Digital compilation 2007, Moodgadget)
- You Made Me Realise (Ltd. cassette 2005, Housing)
- Six Cognitive Works (Ltd. CDR/FLAC 2007, Kning Disk)
- Fervency (File/FLAC 2009, Moodgadget)
- Rural Route No. 2 (Ltd. CDR 2010, Standard Form)
- Pour les Octaves (Ltd. cassette 2010, Peasant Magik)
- SMM: Context (CD/LP/Digital compilation 2011, Ghostly International)
- Intimate Rituals of Kyle Bobby Dunn (Ltd. CDR 2011, Intransitive Recordings)
- In Miserum Stercus (Ltd. vinyl LP 2012, Komino)
- A Chance Happening (C30 ltd., 2015, Shaking Box)
- Cescon (Digital 2015, self-released)
- The Searchers (Vinyl 2018, Whited Sepulchre; Digital 2018, self-released)
- Kyle Bobby Dunn/Anjou Print/Track 04 (10" vinyl, 2018, Thesis)
- The Sender (Digital 2020, self-released)
- And You Could Have It All (Digital 2020, self-released)
- They Have Always Been Within (Digital 2020, self-released)
- Interlude (Digital 2020, self-released)
- Given (Digital 2020, self-released)
- Jetable (Digital 2023, self-released)
- Calme Déception E.P. (Digital 2024, self-released)
- Runge's Last Stand Variantes (Digital 2024, self-released)
- Projections On A Golden Theme (Digital 2025, self-released)
- Relique (Digital 2025, self-released)

Collaborations

- Perils – Perils (Kyle Bobby Dunn and Benoît Pioulard) (vinyl/digital 2015, Desire Path Recordings)

== See also ==
- List of ambient music artists
