= Mux Mool =

American musician and producer

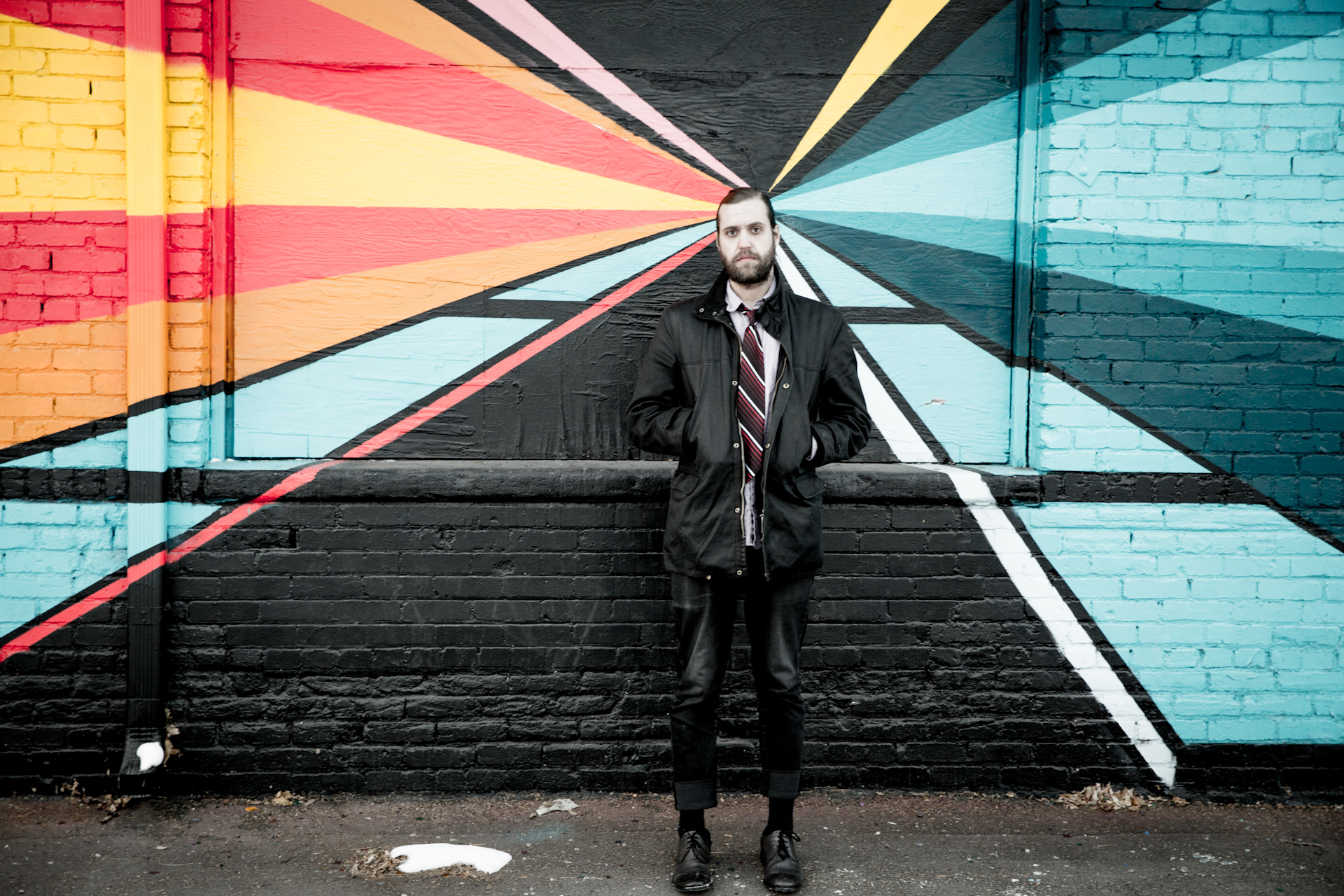
- Mux Mool's Official Press Photo in Denver, CO

Background information
- Born: Brian Lindgren
- Genres: IDM, electronic music
- Labels: Moodgadget, Ghostly International

Mux Mool (born Brian Lindgren) is an American electronic musician, producer, and visual artist affiliated with the labels Moodgadget, Ghostly International, and Super Best Records. He has been featured on Cartoon Network's Adult Swim, and is a member of Club Scouts, a musical partnership with Michal Menert. He currently resides in Denver, Colorado.

== Biography ==
Mux Mool was born in Minnesota, and made his first electronic track in 1998. He attended The Perpich Center for Arts Education (Golden Valley, MN) from 2000 to 2001, where he studied visual arts. He made his commercial debut with the track "Lost and Found" in 2006. Released by Moodgadget on their Rorschach Suite compilation. Lindgren moved to Brooklyn in 2008 and released the Drum EP and Death 9000. He played his first show with Black Moth Super Rainbow that year at the 7th St. Entry at First Avenue in Minneapolis. One of his tracks, "Night Court", was placed on the Ghostly Swim compilation assembled for Adult Swim by Ghostly International. Two other tracks, 10 and Death 9000 were placed on Moodgadget's Synchonicity Suite and No New Enemies Volume 1, respectively.

In 2009, Mux Mool embarked on his first national tour alongside Eliot Lipp. That year he also released the EP Just Saying is All on Moodgadget. In 2010 he debuted his first full-length album, Skulltaste on Ghostly International. In 2010 Mux Mool released 2 more EP's, Viking Funeral and the remix collection Wax Rose Sunday shortly after, also on Ghostly International. He was also a part of a six-month tour alongside the livetronica band Lotus that year.

In 2011, he released Drum EP 2 with Ghostly International. He also opened for Bassnectar's New Year's Eve show in Nashville's Bridgestone Arena alongside Chali 2na and Break Science.

Planet High School, Mux Mool's second full-length album, was released in 2012 under Ghostly International. That year he also headlined the Heineken Green Room Tour in India and a short tour in Australia. Shortly after, he moved to Denver, Colorado.

While Mux Mool has always been a visual artist, he made his public debut in Denver in 2013 with an art show at Jiberish LoHi. Additionally, he played a smattering of shows at the end of Michal Menert's Space Jazz Tour 2013. Alongside Michal Menert, he co-founded Super Best Records in early 2014. His first release under that label was the EP Appetite for Production. He and Menert teamed up once again in 2014 to create the duo Club Scouts, making their debut at the 1-Up Colfax in Denver.

In addition to official tours, Mux Mool has opened for musicians such as Daedelus, Low End Theory, Gaslamp Killer, Blackbird Blackbird, Africa Hitech and many more. He has also been featured on festivals such as Wakarusa, South by Southwest, Starscape, and Camp Bisco.

== Name etymology ==
Lindgren was dubbed Mux Mool by a band he admired after he posted a blog on MySpace soliciting fans to submit names for his project. “Mux is short for ‘multiplexing,’ which is the streaming of many types of information through one channel,” he explains, “and Chac-Mool is an ancient Meso-American statue of a reclining man.”

== Discography ==
=== Albums ===
- Skulltaste (Ghostly International, 2010)
- Planet High School (Ghostly International, 2012)
- Implied Lines (2016)
- Skulltaste II (2020)

=== EPs ===
- Drum EP (Moodgadget, 2008)
- Death 9000 (Moodgadget, 2008)
- Just Saying Is All (Moodgadget, 2009)
- Viking Funeral (Ghostly International, 2010)
- Wax Rose Saturday (Ghostly International, 2010)
- Drum EP 2 (Ghostly International, 2011)
- Appetite for Production (Super Best Records, 2014)
