= Dreaming of a Bigger Life =

Studio album by Michal Menert
- Released: June 8, 2010
- Genre: Hip hop, Hairtronica, Electronic
- Length: 76:13
- Label: Pretty Lights Music
- Producer: Michal Menert

Michal Menert chronology
Dreaming of a Bigger Life (2010)	Even If It Isn't Right (2012)

Dreaming of a Bigger Life is the second solo album by the Polish-American electronic music artist Michal Menert released on June 8, 2010 by Pretty Lights Music. It is his first album after his departure from Pretty Lights. It is known for the tracks "Feeling Better", "Sun/Shadow", "Heart Attack" featuring Benjamin Linder O'Neill on vocals, and "The Ratio" co-produced by labelmate and friend since high school Paul Basic.

== Track listing ==
Dreaming Of A Bigger Life
No.	Title	Length
1.	"…Into Your Dreams"	0:56
2.	"In The Morning"	5:03
3.	"Starfall"	4:13
4.	"Sun/Shadow"	6:51
5.	"Lights Out"	4:11
6.	"Waveshift"	4:48
7.	"Foolin' Myself"	4:17
8.	"The Ratio (co-produced by Paul Arnaud Brandt)"	4:33
9.	"So Alone"	4:54
10.	"Feeling Better"	5:37
11.	"One More Year"	6:29
12.	"Alpha Omega"	5:01
13.	"Where Do You Go?"	4:28
14.	"The Coming Age"	4:51
15.	"Heart Attack (feat. Benjamin Linder O'Neill)"	4:30
16.	"Tomorrow May Never Come…"	5:38
