= Passing by Behind Your Eyes =

Studio album by Pretty Lights
- Released: October 6, 2009
- Genre: Electronica
- Length: 1:13:38
- Label: Pretty Lights Music
- Producer: Derek Vincent Smith

Pretty Lights chronology
Filling Up the City Skies (2008)	Passing by Behind Your Eyes (2009)	A Color Map of the Sun (2013)

Passing by Behind Your Eyes is the third studio album by the American electronic music producer Pretty Lights, released on October 6, 2009 by Pretty Lights Music. It is the second album by the project to only have Smith. The album was first released as a free download from the Pretty Lights Music website.

== Track listing ==
No.	Title	Length
1.	"World of Illusion"	3:14
2.	"Sunday School"	6:31
3.	"Short Cut/Detour"	5:18
4.	"If I Could Feel Again"	5:40
5.	"Someday Is Everyday"	6:41
6.	"Fly Away Another Day"	7:07
7.	"Can't Stop Me Now"	4:44
8.	"Let 'Em Know It's Time to Go"	5:16
9.	"Lonesome Street"	5:24
10.	"City of One"	5:57
11.	"Dark as the Sky"	5:38
12.	"Keep 'Em Bouncin'"	6:45
13.	"Ask Your Friends"	5:23

== Credits ==
- Design, Layout – Michal Menert
- Mastered By – Geoff Pesche
- Producer – Derek Vincent Smith

Notes

- All tracks produced and engineered for Pretty Lights Music Inc.
- Mastered at Abbey Road Studios.
