= Beacon (band) =

American electronic band

- Origin: Brooklyn, New York, United States
- Genres: Electronic, downtempo
- Years active: 2011–present
- Label: Ghostly International
- Members: Thomas Mullarney III; Jacob Gossett
- Website: www.beaconband.com

Beacon is an American electronic music group from Brooklyn, New York consisting of producer Jacob Gossett and vocalist/lyricist Thomas Mullarney III.

== History ==
Beacon was founded in 2011 by Thomas Mullarney III and Jacob Gossett, both of whom were students at the Pratt Institute at the time. They began by self-releasing their first singles through the Bandcamp platform. Later that year, Moodgadget issued the group's first EP, No Body, leading to tours with Gold Panda, Oneohtrix Point Never, and Tycho. In 2012 the group signed with Ghostly International, who released their debut full-length, The Ways We Separate, in 2013. A sophomore full-length, Escapements, arrived on the same label in early 2016.

In 2020, Apple Inc. used the band's song "Show Me How" while launching a new MacBook Pro model at the company's November keynote event.

== Discography ==
Albums

- The Ways We Separate (Ghostly International, April 2013)
- Escapements (Ghostly International, February 2016)
- Gravity Pairs (Ghostly International, November 2018)
- Along the Lethe (Apparent Motion, September 2022)

EPs

- No Body (Moodgadget, November 2011)
- For Now (Ghostly International, October 2012)
- L1 (Ghostly International, December 2014)
