= A Color Map of the Sun =

Studio album by Pretty Lights
- Released: July 2, 2013
- Recorded: Electronica
- Length: 70:56
- Label: Pretty Lights Music; 8 Minutes 20 Seconds
- Producer: Derek Vincent Smith

Pretty Lights chronology
Passing by Behind Your Eyes (2009)	A Color Map of the Sun (2013)

A Color Map of the Sun is the fourth studio album by the American electronic music producer Pretty Lights, released on July 2, 2013 by Pretty Lights Music and 8 Minutes 20 Seconds Records. The album is Smith's second double album, as well as his first to be composed entirely from his own original material. Smith's recordings were originally pressed as samples on vinyl and then mixed using software. Purely analog modular synthesis was also used in the making of the album. In describing why he chose this requirement, Smith has stated: "I was trying to think of something that would be a massive challenge for myself and just a really cool project. I wanted to also prove to myself I could do it."

A Color Map of the Sun was the first album that Smith released as a physical product at the same time as the digital copy, and double vinyl and CD copies were also released. The second disc of the CD features an additional 13 live studio recordings of the new music produced for the album. A documentary was filmed during the making of the album and was released the same day as the album.

The album made its debut at #2 on the Billboard Dance/Electronic Charts. On December 6, 2013 A Color Map of the Sun received nomination for Best Dance/Electronica Album in the 2014 Grammys. Pretty Lights made his TV debut on Conan, performing "Around the Block" with Talib Kweli, Break Science, and Eric Krasno of Soulive.

Professional ratings
Review scores
Source	Rating
Rolling Stone	3.5/5 stars
Sputnikmusic	3.2/5

== Track listing ==
A Color Map of the Sun

Disc One
No.	Title	Length
1.	"Color of My Soul"	6:08
2.	"Press Pause"	4:49
3.	"Let's Get Busy"	3:52
4.	"Around the Block (featuring Talib Kweli)"	4:13
5.	"Yellow Bird"	5:40
6.	"Go Down Sunshine"	5:05
7.	"So Bright (featuring Eligh)"	5:51
8.	"Vibe Vendetta"	5:24
9.	"Done Wrong"	6:35
10.	"Prophet"	5:56
11.	"One Day They'll Know"	6:59
12.	"Always All Ways"	5:32
13.	"My Only Hope"	4:52
Total length:		70:56

Deluxe Edition Bonus Tracks
No.	Title	Length
14.	"Where I'm Trying to Go"	5:49
15.	"All I've Ever Known"	3:53
16.	"Sweet Long Life"	5:33
Total length:		86:11

Disc Two - Live Studio Sessions From A Color Map of the Sun
No.	Title	Length
1.	"Reel 15 Break 5"	3:36
2.	"Reel 5 Break 3"	3:37
3.	"Reel 9 Break 6"	3:18
4.	"Reel 11 Break 2"	2:56
5.	"Reel 6 Break 4"	3:05
6.	"Reel 8 Break 2"	2:30
7.	"Reel 18 Session 1"	3:55
8.	"Reel 17 Break 4"	3:06
9.	"Reel 4 Break 3"	3:31
10.	"Reel 12 Break 2"	3:34
11.	"Reel 6 Break 5"	3:47
12.	"Reel 3 Break 3"	3:00
13.	"Reel 7 Break 1"	3:09
Total length:		43:04
