= List of Shangri-La Frontier chapters =

The Japanese manga series Shangri-La Frontier, illustrated by Ryosuke Fuji, is based on the web novel series of the same name by Katarina. Its chapters have been published in Kodansha's Weekly Shōnen Magazine since July 15, 2020. Kodansha has collected its chapters into individual tankōbon volumes. The first volume was released on October 16, 2020. As of October 16, 2026, 28 volumes have been released.

In North America, Kodansha USA announced the English language digital release of the manga in November 2020. In November 2021, Kodansha USA announced that it would begin releasing the series in print, with the first volume released on September 6, 2022.

== Volumes ==
No.	Original release date	Original ISBN	English release date	English ISBN
1	October 16, 2020	978-4-06-521529-6; 978-4-06-521802-0 (LE)	December 8, 2020 (digital); September 6, 2022 (print)	978-1-64659-888-5 (digital); 978-1-64651-482-3 (print)
1. "Why Do You Game?" (貴方はなんのためにゲームをしますか？, Anata wa nan no tame ni gēmu o shimasu ka?); 2. "A Different Kind of Player" (特異なる者, Tokuinaru mono); 3. "The Black Wolf's Night Attack" (黒狼夜襲, Kuro ōkami yashū); 4. "One Unique After Another" (連鎖するユニーク, Rensa suru Yunīku); 5. "Washing Down the Good Stuff with Kusoge" (肥えた価値観をクソゲーで濯ぐ, Koeta kachikan o kusogē de sosogu)
2	December 17, 2020	978-4-06-521801-3; 978-4-06-521529-6 (LE)	February 23, 2021 (digital); October 18, 2022 (print)	978-1-64659-948-6 (digital); 978-1-64651-483-0 (print)
6. "Two Animals on a Mission" (二羽の強行軍, Futaba no kyōkōgun); 7. "Bird-Head & Bunny vs. Moleshark" (鳥面with兎vs.鮫土竜, Tori-men uizu usagi vs. same mogura); 8. "Flying Human, Hopping Bunny" (人は飛び、兎は跳ぶ, Hito wa tobi, usagi wa tobu); 9. "Beware, For Thine Enemies are Legion" (かくて汝、騒動の槍衾に囲まれん, Kakute nanji, sōdō no yaribusuma ni kakoma ren); 10. "The Stationery-Knight Queen" (筆記用具の騎士王, Hikkiyōgu no kishi-ō); 11. "The Typhoon's Eye, Raging Inward" (内向きに荒ぶ台風の目, Uchi muki ni susabu Taifū no me); 12. "Things Move" (状況始動, Jōkyō shidō); 13. "Bearing Fruit" (状況結実, Jōkyō ketsujitsu); 14. "Aberrant Woodmage, The Fallen Divine" (神代の残滓、妄執の敗者, Jindai no zanshi, mōshū no haisha); 15. "The 500-Limit Concerto and the Victory Seeker" (300リミット狂想曲、勝算を追う者, 300 rimitto kyōsōkyoku, shōsan o ou mono)
3	March 17, 2021	978-4-06-522220-1; 978-4-06-522219-5 (LE)	August 3, 2021 (digital); December 27, 2022 (print)	978-1-63699-289-1 (digital); 978-1-64651-484-7 (print)
16. "The 500-Limit Concerto and the Hopeful Dodger" (300リミット狂想曲、勝算を抱え逃げる者, 300 rimitto kyōsōkyoku, shōsan o kakae nigeru mono); 17. "The Egyptian Art Guy, Soaring Through the Air" (宙を駆けるは壁画のアレ, Chū o kakeru wa hekiga no are); 18. "A Dazzling Sea of Trees" (華やかなる樹の海, Hanayakanaru ki no umi); 19. "Taking Advantage of a Just Cause" (大義名分は有効活用, Taigimeibun wa yūkō katsuyō); 20. "Bird Mask vs Clown Spider" (鳥面vs.道化蜘蛛, Tori-men vs. dōke kumo); 21. "Let's Go Tomb Raiding!" (やろうぜ! 墓荒らし!!, Yarou ze! Hakaarashi!!); 22. "Shining True" (まことのかがやき, Makoto no kagayaki); 23. "Steel Beyond Any Bound" (身の丈を超えるハガネ, Minotake o koeru hagane); 24. "Multihued Fists of Fury" (徹・拳・色・砕, Tōru-ken-iro-sai); 25. "Regret Always Lies in the Past" (後悔はいつも過去にいる, Kōkai wa itsumo kako ni iru)
4	June 17, 2021	978-4-06-523584-3; 978-4-06-523585-0 (LE)	November 9, 2021 (digital); February 21, 2023 (print)	978-1-63699-464-2 (digital); 978-1-64651-485-4 (print)
26. "Only the Lingering Regrets Remain" (未練だけがそこにいる, Miren dake ga soko ni iru); 27. "The Well-Placed Backstory" (適材適所の世界観, Tekizaitekisho no sekai-kan); 28. "Challenging Unknown Martial Arts" (未知なる武に挑む, Michinaru bu ni idomu); 29. "Smush!" (ぷちっと, Puchitto); 30. "Last Rites Across the Threshold" (渡すは引導渡るは彼岸, Watasu wa indō wataru wa higan); 31. "All Emotions in the Moment (Part 1)" (刹那に想いを込めて 其の一, Setsuna ni omoi o komete sono ichi); 32. "All Emotions in the Moment (Part 2)" (刹那に想いを込めて 其の二, Setsuna ni omoi o komete sono ni); 33. "All Emotions in the Moment (Part 3)" (刹那に想いを込めて 其の三, Setsuna ni omoi o komete sono san); 34. "All Emotions in the Moment (Part 4)" (刹那に想いを込めて 其の四, Setsuna ni omoi o komete sono shi); 35. "All Emotions in the Moment (Part 5)" (刹那に想いを込めて 其の五, Setsuna ni omoi o komete sono go)
5	August 17, 2021	978-4-06-524483-8; 978-4-06-524502-6 (LE)	January 11, 2022 (digital); April 25, 2023 (print)	978-1-64651-486-1 (digital); 978-1-63699-557-1 (print)
36. "All Emotions in the Moment (Part 6)" (刹那に想いを込めて 其の六, Setsuna ni omoi o komete sono roku); 37. "All Emotions in the Moment (Part 7)" (刹那に想いを込めて 其の七, Setsuna ni omoi o komete sono nana); 38. "All Emotions in the Moment (Part 8)" (刹那に想いを込めて 其の八, Setsuna ni omoi o komete sono hachi); 39. "All Emotions in the Moment (Part 9)" (刹那に想いを込めて 其の九, Setsuna ni omoi o komete sono kyū); 40. "All Emotions in the Moment (Part 10)" (刹那に想いを込めて 其の十, Setsuna ni omoi o komete sono jū); 41. "All Emotions in the Moment (Part 11)" (刹那に想いを込めて 其の十一, Setsuna ni omoi o komete sono jū ichi); 42. "All Emotions in the Moment (Part 12)" (刹那に想いを込めて 其の十二, Setsuna ni omoi o komete sono jū ni); 43. "All Emotions in the Moment (Part 13)" (刹那に想いを込めて 其の十三, Setsuna ni omoi o komete sono jū san); 44. "A World Progressed, a Hero Revealed" (進む世界、明かされる英雄, Susumu sekai, akasa reru eiyū); 45. "Responsibility and Overkill" (ケジメとオーバーキル, Kejime to ōbākiru)
6	November 17, 2021	978-4-06-526001-2; 978-4-06-526002-9 (LE)	May 3, 2022 (digital); June 27, 2023 (print)	978-1-64651-659-9 (digital); 978-1-68491-161-5 (print)
46. "The Current Situation and What Comes Next" (それぞれの今と次, Sorezore no ima to ji); 47. "Wezaemon's Legacy" (ウェザエモンの遺産, Uezaemon no isan); 48. "Prof. Pencilgon's PK Laundering Seminar" (ペンシルゴン先生によるPKロンダリング教室, Penshirugon sensei ni yoru PK rondaringu kyōshitsu); 49. "Fetching, Raising, Conquering" (お使いと育成と攻略と, Otsukai to ikusei to kōryaku to); 50. "The Metamorphosing Fashionista" (メタモルフォーゼ•ファッショニスタ, Metamorufōze fasshonisuta); 51. "The Walking Air Refreshener" (ウォーキング・オブ・ザ・エアクリーナー, Uōkingu obu za ea kurīnā); 52. "Bird + Rabbits vs. Skull Choir" (鳥 with 兎's vs. 合唱髑髏, Tori uizu usagi's vs. gasshō dokuro); 53. "Ah, Magic Jobs/All Paper Armor" (嗚呼魔法職、嗚呼紙装甲, Aa mahō-shoku, aa kami sōkō); 54. "Rare Items: More Valuable than Life" (レアアイテムは命よりも重い, Reā Itemu wa inochi yori mo omoi); 55. "Judging an Item by its Cover" (アイテムは中身ではなくガワが重要, Aitemu wa nakamide wanaku gawa ga jūyō)
7	January 17, 2022	978-4-06-526603-8; 978-4-06-526604-5 (LE)	September 13, 2022 (digital); August 29, 2023 (print)	978-1-68491-427-2 (digital); 978-1-64651-660-5 (print)
56. "Winning the Battle, Losing the War" (試合に勝って勝負に負ける, Shiai ni katte shōbu ni makeru); 57. "Howling Winds of Turmoil (and Cats)" (そして猫と騒動の風が吹く, Soshite neko to sōdō no kazegafuku); 58. "Explorer of the World's Darkness" (世界の暗闇を拓く者, Sekai no kurayami o hiraku mono); 59. "The Half-Naked Hero and Friends in Golem Paradise" (半裸と愉快な仲間達inゴーレムパラダイス, Hanra to yukaina nakama-tachi in gōremu paradaisu); 60. "The Past Always Stabs You in the Back" (過去はいつだって背後から刺して来る, Kako wa itsu datte haigo kara sashite kuru); 61. "An Unfriendly Gate Guard" (融通知らずの門番, Yūzū-shirazu no monban); 62. "The Unknown, Concealing Good and Evil Until Revealed" (未知は明かされるまで賢愚善悪を秘する, Michi wa akasa reru made kengu zen'aku o hi suru); 63. "Dancing Conferences, Spinning Motives, and Zombies" (踊る会議、巡る思惑、あとゾンビ, Odoru kaigi, meguru omowaku, ato zonbi); 64. "Accelerating Conference, Surging Greed, and Multiple Beginnings" (加速する会議、迸る欲望、そしてそれぞれの糸口, Kasoku suru kaigi, hotobashiru yokubō, soshite sorezore no itoguchi); 65. "Know Whose Hand You Dance Upon" (誰の掌の上で踊っているのかを知るがいい, Dare no tenohira no ue de odotte iru no ka o shiru ga ī)
8	April 15, 2022	978-4-06-527530-6; 978-4-06-527528-3 (LE)	November 1, 2022 (digital); November 7, 2023 (print)	978-1-68491-531-6 (digital); 978-1-64651-809-8 (print)
66. "All Things Must Fall, All of Creation Must Be Conquered" (万物は真下へと落ちる、万象は攻略法を秘める, Banbutsu wa mashita e to ochiru, banshō wa kōryaku-hō o himeru); 67. "Towards the Sky, Dreaming the Impossible" (人は不可能に夢を見る、いざ空を歩く時, Hito wa fukanō ni yumewomiru, iza sora o aruku toki); 68. "Aloof Sympathy at the Scorpion Falls" (水晶の滝、孤高を通じてのシンパシー, Suishō no taki, kokō o tsūjite no shinpashī); 69. "Impelled by Hunger" (その衝動は、飢餓, Sono shōdō wa, kiga); 70. "A Tenacity Called Craving" (その執念は、渇望, Sono shūnen wa, katsubō); 71. "Despair After the Onslaught" (激闘の果てに、絶望, Gekitō no hate ni, zetsubō); 72. "Like Eating Wheat Instead of Grain" (米の代わりにライスを食べる的な, Amerika no kawarini raisu o taberu-tekina); 73. "Twin Wings in a Drag" (双翼(そうよく)相打つ, Sōyoku aiutsu); 74. "The One Beckoning a New Tide" (新たな潮を招く者, Aratana shio o maneku mono); 75. "Not a Fight, but a Hunt Where Predator Stalks Prey" (これは戦いではない、捕食者が被捕食者を捕らう狩りである, Kore wa tatakaide wanai, hoshoku-sha ga hi hoshoku-sha o torau karidearu)
9	July 15, 2022	978-4-06-528432-2; 978-4-06-528433-9 (LE)	January 3, 2023 (digital); December 26, 2023 (print)	978-1-68491-632-0 (digital); 978-1-64651-829-6 (print)
76. "Like Lions Against Rabbits, A Crab's Pizza Cutter Against the Phoenix" (獅子は兎に全力を、蟹は不死鳥にピザカッター, Shishi wa usagi ni zenryoku o, kani wa fushichō ni piza kattā); 77. "The "Winning is Everything" Counter" (勝てばよかろうなのだカウンター, Kateba yokarou na noda kauntā); 78. "What to Do, What to Aim For, What to Rely On" (何をすべきか、何を目指すべきか、何に頼るべきか, Nani o subeki ka, nani o mezasubeki ka, nani ni tayorubeki ka); 79. "Let Your Impatience Fuel You" (駆けろ、焦燥を燃料に, Kakero, shōsō o nenryō ni); 80. "The Hammer of Justice to the Dressed-Up Clay Doll" (着飾る泥人形に鉄槌を, Kikazaru doro ningyō ni tettsui o); 81. "The Floating Freak Encounters the Battle Master" (そして宙を舞う変態と最大火力は邂逅す, Soshite chū o mau hentai to saidai karyoku wa kaigō su); 82. "Sniffing Out Like a Hunting Dog" (猟犬の如く嗅ぎ付けて, Ryōken nogotoku kagitsukete); 83. "Embracing Your Ambitions in the Light (Part 1)" (大志の灯火を抱いて 其の一, Taishi no tomoshibi o daite sono ichi); 84. "Embracing Your Ambitions in the Light (Part 2)" (大志の灯火を抱いて 其のニ, Taishi no tomoshibi o daite sono ni); 85. "Embracing Your Ambitions in the Light (Part 3)" (大志の灯火を抱いて 其の三, Taishi no tomoshibi o daite sono san)
10	September 16, 2022	978-4-06-529136-8; 978-4-06-529137-5 (LE)	March 7, 2023 (digital); February 27, 2024 (print)	978-1-68491-841-6 (digital); 978-1-64651-900-2 (print)
86. "Embracing Your Ambitions in the Light (Part 4)" (大志の灯火を抱いて 其の四, Taishi no tomoshibi o daite sono shi); 87. "Embracing Your Ambitions in the Light (Part 5)" (大志の灯火を抱いて 其の五, Taishi no tomoshibi o daite sono go); 88. "Embracing Your Ambitions in the Light (Part 6)" (大志の灯火を抱いて 其の六, Taishi no tomoshibi o daite sono roku); 89. "Embracing Your Ambitions in the Light (Part 7)" (大志の灯火を抱いて 其の七, Taishi no tomoshibi o daite sono nana); 90. "Embracing Your Ambitions in the Light (Part 8)" (大志の灯火を抱いて 其の八, Taishi no tomoshibi o daite sono hachi); 91. "Embracing Your Ambitions in the Light (Part 9)" (大志の灯火を抱いて 其の九, Taishi no tomoshibi o daite sono kyū); 92. "Embracing Your Ambitions in the Light (Part 10)" (大志の灯火を抱いて 其の十, Taishi no tomoshibi o daite sono jū); 93. "Embracing Your Ambitions in the Light (Part 11)" (大志の灯火を抱いて 其の十一, Taishi no tomoshibi o daite sono jū ichi); 94. "Embracing Your Ambitions in the Light (Part 12)" (大志の灯火を抱いて 其の十ニ, Taishi no tomoshibi o daite sono jū ni); 95. "Embracing Your Ambitions in the Light (Part 13)" (大志の灯火を抱いて 其の十三, Taishi no tomoshibi o daite sono jū san)
11	December 16, 2022	978-4-06-529989-0; 978-4-06-529990-6 (LE)	May 2, 2023 (digital); April 30, 2024 (print)	978-1-68491-929-1 (digital); 978-1-64651-949-1 (print)
96. "Once in a Lifetime, Over and Over" (一期一会を何度でも, Ichigoichie o nandodemo); 97. "What Do You Game For? – Oikatzo's Reply" (貴方はなんのためにゲームをしますか？：オイカッツォの回答, Anata wa nan no tame ni gēmu o shimasu ka? : Oikattso no kaitō); 98. "What Do You Game For? – Pencilgon's Reply" (貴方はなんのためにゲームをしますか？：ペンシルゴンの回答, Anata wa nan no tame ni gēmu o shimasu ka? : Penshirugon no kaitō); 99. "A Straight Flush, With a Joker Mixed In" (ジョーカー混じりのストレートフラッシュ, Jōkā-majiri no sutorēto furasshu); 100. "The Perishable Delivery" (運送品はナマモノ注意, Unsō-hin wa namamono chūi); 101. "The Scarlet Whale and the Monster of the Sea" (赤鯨、魚怪と相対す, Aka kujira,-gyo kai to sōtai su); 102. "The Foul-Weather, Heavy-Waves San Check" (荒天荒波SANチェック, Kōten aranami SAN chekku); 103. "The Die Had Already Been Cast" (既に賽は投げられていた, Sudeni sai wa nage rarete ita); 104. "End of Tranquility, Dawn of the Ruined City" (静謐が終わる、廃都よ賑やかなれ, Seihitsu ga owaru, hai-to yo nigiyaka nare); 105. "A Shark and a Bird Resisting the Abyss" (深淵に抗う鮫と鳥, Shin'en ni aragau same to tori)
12	March 16, 2023	978-4-06-531037-3; 978-4-06-531036-6 (LE)	September 5, 2023 (digital); June 25, 2024 (print)	979-8-88933-137-7 (digital); 979-8-88877-063-4 (print)
106. "The World and its Reason, Turned on its Head" (ハンテンするセカイ、コトワリすらも, Hanten suru sekai, kotowari sura mo); 107. "The Limit-Limit March" (リミットリミット・マーチ, Rimitto rimitto māchi); 108. "So What? It's Aquatic! (Dragon Kingfish)" (だって水棲だもの 龍王魚編, Datte suiseida mono ryū-gyo-hen); 109. "Filleting the Dragonfish" (いざ龍魚三枚おろし, Iza ryū-gyo sanmai oroshi); 110. "Roars and Destruction as a Beacon" (轟音と破壊をビーコンに, Gōon to hakai o bīkon ni); 111. "The Wolf-Gang Leaves the Sea for the Skyscrapers" (そして旅狼(ヴォルフガング)は海から摩天楼へ, Soshite tabi ōkami (Vorufugangu) wa umi kara matenrō e); 112. "Top Meteor in the Shower" (流星雨の一等星, Ryūsei ame no ittōsei); 113. "Good and Evil Across the Chaotic Town" (混沌たる街に正義と悪は駆け巡る, Kontontaru machi ni seigi to aku wa kake meguru); 114. "The Thing with Licensed Games" (キャラゲーとはすなわち, Kyaragē to wa sunawachi); 115. "Mixing Up Chaos in the Wintry Whirlpool" (木枯らし渦巻き混沌を混ぜる, Kogarashi uzumaki konton o mazeru)
13	May 17, 2023	978-4-06-531586-6; 978-4-06-531585-9 (LE)	December 5, 2023 (digital); August 27, 2024 (print)	979-8-88933-287-9 (digital); 979-8-88877-064-1 (print)
116. "The Miraculous Light Boasts its Glory for Just One Moment" (ただ一瞬にて気取るは灼光の限界, Tada isshun nite kidoru wa shakkō no genkai); 117. "Which Way is the Longest?" (果たしてどちらが寄り道か, Hatashite dochira ga yorimichi ka); 118. "The Half-Naked Gamer and His Tepid Domestic Stuff" (半裸が飲む国産のエナドリは、薄い, Hanra ga nomu kokusan no enadori wa, usui); 119. "Murder at 100 Meters Per Second" (秒速百メートルの殺意, Byōsoku hyaku mētoru no satsui); 120. "Be Not Afraid of Thine Tyrant" (暴君を恐るる事なかれ, Bōkun o osoruru koto nakare); 121. "Lord of the Depths, Prepare to be Formally Pulverized" (深き海の王よ、ぶちのめし奉る, Fukaki umi no ō yo, buchinomeshi tatematsuru); 122. "Run, Climb, and Rage in the Dark" (無影にて駆けろ、登れ、そして騒げ, Muyō nite kakero, nobore, soshite sawage); 123. "Karma Sides with Whom?" (果たして誰が因果応報か, Hatashite dare ga ingaōhō ka); 124. "The A-(For Anonymous)-Team Faces a Crisis" (匿名(馬鹿)野郎Aチーム、そして風雲急, Baka yarō A chīmu, soshite fūun kyū); 125. "Selfless Service (For a Fee)" (誰が為の尽力(有料), Daregatame no yūryō)
14	July 14, 2023	978-4-06-532219-2; 978-4-06-532220-8 (LE)	January 2, 2024 (digital); October 29, 2024 (print)	979-8-88933-319-7 (digital); 979-8-88877-158-7 (print)
126. "The Out-of-Season Pumpkin and the Out-of-Character Knight" (季節外れのカボチャとくっ殺しない女騎士, Kisetsuhazure no kabocha to kukkoro shinai on'na kishi); 127. "Destiny, Imitation, and Allegiance to Evil" (因縁模倣、汝悪に忠実たれ, In'nen mohō, nanji aku ni chūjitsutare); 128. "A Case of Uninformed Consent" (Not インフォームド・コンセント, Not infōmudo konsento); 129. "Can't Find the Needle in the Haystack if You Don't Try" (掉棒打星、されど振らぬ事には始まらない, Tōbōdasei, saredo furanu koto ni wa hajimaranai); 130. "The Struggling Vanguard, The Smiling Fiend, and the Shining Weirdo" (足掻く先鋒、笑う外道、光る変態, Agaku senpō, warau gedō, hikaru hentai); 131. "Craftiness Hides in the Shadows, Laughing at Tranquility"e (悪辣は陰に潜み平穏を嗤う, Akuratsu wa in ni hisomi heion o warau); 132. "Dance Away, Atop the Stage of Infamy" (外道劇場にて踊れや踊れ, Gedō gekijō nite odoreya odore); 133. "Out-Out-Out-Outsmarting" (裏の裏の裏の裏をかく, Ura no ura no ura no ura o kaku); 134. "A Gallon of Gasoline on the Bonfire" (焚き火にガソリンをリットルで, Takibi ni gasorin o rittoru de); 135. "The Outrageous Theater Heats Up" (外道劇場ヒートアップ, Gedō gekijō hīto appu)
15	October 17, 2023	978-4-06-533152-1; 978-4-06-533146-0 (LE)	March 5, 2024 (digital); February 25, 2025 (print)	979-8-88933-406-4 (digital); 979-8-88877-285-0 (print)
136. "Romance Strengthens You; Love Corners You" (恋が貴方を強くした、愛が貴方を追い詰める, Koi ga anata o tsuyoku shita, ai ga anata o oitsumeru); 137. "The Hero Arrives Fashionably Late" (ヒーローは遅れてやってくる, Hīrō wa okurete yatte kuru); 138. "The Shooting Star Never Stops" (流星は止まらない, Ryūsei wa tomaranai); 139. "The Day is Saved!" (あくはほろびた！, Aku wa horobita!); 140. "The Arrogant Challenger – Ignition" (傲岸不遜のチャレンジャー：イグニッション, Gōgan fuson no charenjā: igunisshon); 141. "The Semi-Flammable Loser- Backdraft" (不全燃焼のルーザー：バックドラフト, Fuzen nenshō no rūzā: bakkudorafuto); 142. "The Raging Avenger- Burnout" (怒髪衝天のリベンジャー：バーンアウト, Dohatsushōten no ribenjā: bānauto); 143. "Molten-Outburst Invader- Full Throttle" (活火激発のインベーダー：フルスロットル, Katsuka gekihatsu no inbēdā: furu surottoru); 144. "The Big-Talking Mega-Speedster- Torque Burst" (気炎万丈のハイスピーダー：トルクバースト, Kienbanjō no hai supīdā: toruku bāsuto); 145. "Twin Titans' Crossfire- Dead Heat" (竜騰虎闘のクロスファイア：デッドヒート, Ryū tōkotō no kurosufaia: deddo hīto)
16	December 15, 2023	978-4-06-533887-2; 978-4-06-533892-6 (LE)	May 7, 2024 (digital); April 22, 2025 (print)	979-8-88933-486-6 (digital); 979-8-88877-286-7 (print)
146. "The Brave and Gallant Breaker – Dead Weight" (義気凛然のブレイカー：デッドウェイト, Gikirinzen no bureikā: deddo ueito); 147. "High-Spirited Outrage – Highlight" (意気軒昂のアウトレイジ：ハイライト, Ikikenkō no autoreiji: hairaito); 148. "Foolishly Courageous Forbidden Star – Overheat" (暴虎馮河のフォビドゥンスター：オーバーヒート, Bōkohyōga no fobidoun sutā: ōbāhīto); 149. "Stalled-Out Overtime Mastermind" (エンスト・ロスタイムファンタジスタ, Ensuto rosu taimu fantajisuta); 150. "The Struggles of Evil" (悪の足搔き, Aku no ashi kaki); 151. "Middle Reliever to the End- Finisher Hold" (堂々終劇のミドルリリーフ：フィニッシュホールド, Dōdō tsui geki no midoru rirīfu: finisshu hōrudo); 152. "Hurling the Baton at the Anchor" (アンカーへバトンを全力投球, Ankā e baton o zenryoku tōkyū); 153. "Road to Fruition" (結実に至る道, Ketsujitsu ni itaru michi); 154. "Pursue the Shadow, and Surpass It Now" (その影を追い、今それを越える, Sono kage o oi, ima sore o koeru); 155. "Start Your Hero Time!"
17	April 17, 2024	978-4-06-535179-6; 978-4-06-535175-8 (LE)	September 3, 2024 (digital); June 24, 2025 (print)	979-8-89478-007-8 (digital); 979-8-88877-391-8 (print)
156. "Starfall: Beyond the Finisher" (星落とし：必殺の先へ, Hoshi otoshi: hissatsu no saki e); 157. "Training and Practice Come Together" (修練と研修の収束, Shūren to kenshū no shūsoku); 158. "Extra Round: Party Time!" (エクストララウンド・パーティータイム！, Ekusutora raundo pātī taimu!); 159. "Crowds Thronging at the Untapped Gold Mine" (未踏の金鉱山に人は集まる, Mitō no kin kōzan ni hito wa atsumaru); 160. "The Fun Afterparty Disaster (Part 1)" (たのしいにじかいだいさんじ：前編, Tanoshī niji kaida isanji: zenpen); 161. "The Fun Afterparty Disaster (Part 2)" (たのしいにじかいだいさんじ：後編, Tanoshī niji kaida isanji: kōhen); 162. "Your Tour of the Abyssal City, Bunny Guide Included" (深淵都市観光兎付き, Shin'en toshi kankō usagi-tsuki); 163. "Super Combining Seafood Robot "Kaisen-Oh"!!!" (海産物合体カイセンオー!!!, Kaisanbutsu gattai kaisen'ō!!!); 164. "As Comfy as a Private Internet Café Room" (居心地はネカフェの個室くらい, Igokochi wa nekafe no koshitsu kurai); 165. "Divorcing an Angel" (天使に三行半を…, Tenshi ni mikudarihan o…)
18	July 17, 2024	978-4-06-536037-8; 978-4-06-536036-1 (LE)	December 3, 2024 (digital); August 19, 2025 (print)	979-8-89478-299-7 (digital); 979-8-88877-476-2 (print)
166. "Days of Connecting, and Being Connected" (繋ぐ、繋がる、繋ぎの日, Tsunagu, tsunagaru, tsunagi no hi); 167. "Running Before Waiting for 3, or 4, or 5" (四を挟んで五より走る, Shi o hasande go yori hashiru); 168. "The Failing Precipice" (破綻する頂点, Hatan suru chōten); 169. "Like Lighting a Wet Match" (湿気たマッチに火を灯すように, Shikketa Matchi ni hi o tomosu yō ni); 170. "Release the Unease, Embrace the Unease" (焦燥よりの解放、いざ焦燥を抱え走れ, Shōsō yori no kaihō, iza shōsō o kakae hashire); 171. "The Proud Enemy's Head Taken... Back Home" (眠る財宝、被る首級、そして帰還するーー, Nemuru zaihō, kōmuru shukyū, soshite kikan suru); 172. "The Meaning of Extremes" (極点の意味, Kyokuten no imi); 173. "Holding the Heavens Aloft, United (Part 1)" (倶に天を戴いて 其の一, Tomoni ten o itadaite sono ichi); 174. "Holding the Heavens Aloft, United (Part 2)" (倶に天を戴いて 其の二, Tomoni ten o itadaite sono ni); 175. "Holding the Heavens Aloft, United (Part 3)" (倶に天を戴いて 其の三, Tomoni ten o itadaite sono san)
19	September 17, 2024	978-4-06-536776-6; 978-4-06-536777-3 (LE)	February 4, 2025 (digital); October 21, 2025 (print)	979-8-89478-364-2 (digital); 979-8-88877-539-4 (print)
176. "Holding the Heavens Aloft, United (Part 4)" (倶に天を戴いて 其の四, Tomoni ten o itadaite sono shi); 177. "Holding the Heavens Aloft, United (Part 5)" (倶に天を戴いて 其の五, Tomoni ten o itadaite sono go); 178. "Holding the Heavens Aloft, United (Part 6)" (倶に天を戴いて 其の六, Tomoni ten o itadaite sono roku); 179. "Holding the Heavens Aloft, United (Part 7)" (倶に天を戴いて 其の七, Tomoni ten o itadaite sono nana); 180. "Holding the Heavens Aloft, United (Part 8)" (倶に天を戴いて 其の八, Tomoni ten o itadaite sono hachi); 181. "Holding the Heavens Aloft, United (Part 9)" (倶に天を戴いて 其の九, Tomoni ten o itadaite sono kyū); 182. "Holding the Heavens Aloft, United (Part 10)" (倶に天を戴いて 其の十, Tomoni ten o itadaite sono jū); 183. "Holding the Heavens Aloft, United (Part 11)" (倶に天を戴いて 其の十一, Tomoni ten o itadaite sono jū ichi); 184. "Holding the Heavens Aloft, United (Part 12)" (倶に天を戴いて 其の十二, Tomoni ten o itadaite sono jū ni); 185. "Holding the Heavens Aloft, United (Part 13)" (倶に天を戴いて 其の十三, Tomoni ten o itadaite sono jū san)
20	November 15, 2024	978-4-06-537743-7; 978-4-06-537744-4 (LE)	April 1, 2025 (digital); January 27, 2026 (print)	979-8-89478-485-4 (digital); 979-8-88877-560-8 (print)
186. "Holding the Heavens Aloft, United (Part 14)" (倶に天を戴いて 其の十四, Tomoni ten o itadaite sono jū shi); 187. "Holding the Heavens Aloft, United (Part 15)" (倶に天を戴いて 其の十五, Tomoni ten o itadaite sono jū go); 188. "Holding the Heavens Aloft, United (Part 16)" (倶に天を戴いて 其の十六, Tomoni ten o itadaite sono jū roku); 189. "Holding the Heavens Aloft, United (Part 17)" (倶に天を戴いて 其の十七, Tomoni ten o itadaite sono jū nana); 190. "Holding the Heavens Aloft, United (Part 18)" (倶に天を戴いて 其の十八, Tomoni ten o itadaite sono jū hachi); 191. "Holding the Heavens Aloft, United (Part 19)" (倶に天を戴いて 其の十九, Tomoni ten o itadaite sono jū kyū); 192. "Holding the Heavens Aloft, United (Part 20)" (倶に天を戴いて 其の二十, Tomoni ten o itadaite sono nijū); 193. "Holding the Heavens Aloft, United (Part 21)" (倶に天を戴いて 其の二十一, Tomoni ten o itadaite sono nijū ichi); 194. "Holding the Heavens Aloft, United (Part 22)" (倶に天を戴いて 其の二十二, Tomoni ten o itadaite sono nijū ni); 195. "Holding the Heavens Aloft, United (Part 23)" (倶に天を戴いて 其の二十三, Tomoni ten o itadaite sono nijū san)
21	February 17, 2025	978-4-06-538421-3; 978-4-06-538426-8 (LE)	June 3, 2025 (digital); March 31, 2026 (print)	979-8-89478-551-6 (digital); 979-8-88877-632-2 (print)
196. "Holding the Heavens Aloft, United (Part 24)" (倶に天を戴いて 其の二十四, Tomoni ten o itadaite sono nijū yon); 197. "Holding the Heavens Aloft, United (Part 25)" (倶に天を戴いて 其の二十五, Tomoni ten o itadaite sono nijū go); 198. "Holding the Heavens Aloft, United (Part 26)" (倶に天を戴いて 其の二十六, Tomoni ten o itadaite sono nijū roku); 199. "Holding the Heavens Aloft, United (Part 27)" (倶に天を戴いて 其の二十七, Tomoni ten o itadaite sono nijū nana); 200. "Holding the Heavens Aloft, United (Part 28)" (倶に天を戴いて 其の二十八, Tomoni ten o itadaite sono nijū hachi); 201. "Holding the Heavens Aloft, United (Part 29)" (倶に天を戴いて 其の二十九, Tomoni ten o itadaite sono nijū kyū); 202. "Holding the Heavens Aloft, United (Part 30)" (倶に天を戴いて 其の三十, Tomoni ten o itadaite sono san jū); 203. "Holding the Heavens Aloft, United (Part 31)" (倶に天を戴いて 其の三十一, Tomoni ten o itadaite sono san jū ichi); 204. "Holding the Heavens Aloft, United (Part 32)" (倶に天を戴いて 其の三十二, Tomoni ten o itadaite sono san jū ni); 205. "Holding the Heavens Aloft, United (Part 33)" (倶に天を戴いて 其の三十三, Tomoni ten o itadaite sono san jū san)
22	April 16, 2025	978-4-06-539092-4; 978-4-06-539093-1 (LE)	September 2, 2025 (digital); May 26, 2026 (print)	979-8-89478-681-0 (digital); 979-8-88877-678-0 (print)
206. "Holding the Heavens Aloft, United (Part 34)" (倶に天を戴いて 其の三十四, Tomoni ten o itadaite sono san jū yon); 207. "Not Allied with Man, Still Manning the Seawall" (我ら人の味方に非ざれど、防波の先陣に立つ, Warera no mikata ni hi zaredo, bōha no senjin ni tatsu); 208. "Diverging Roads, United Hearts" (道は違えど心は同じ, Michi wa chigaedo kokoro wa onaji); 209. "Beasts Smelling Out War" (戦火を嗅ぎつける獣, Senka o kagitsukeru kemono); 210. "Behind the Curtain, or Those Who Are Called Too" (裏方、あるいは神と呼称される者, Urakata, aruiwa kami to koshō sa reru mono); 211. "The Wolf Pack Transfer" (ウルフパック・トランスファー, Urufupakku toransufā); 212. "Ruling the Skies, Seeking the Decline of the Golden" (其は天穹を覇する黄金の失墜を望む者, Sore wa tenkyū o hasuru ōgon no shittsui o nozomu mon); 213. "Real Strength" (リアル・ストロング, Riaru sutorongu); 214. "The Bad Wolf, The Furious Rabbit, and the Freaky Cat" (わるいおおかみ、きれるうさぎ、へんたいねこ, Warui o okami, kireru usagi, hentai neko); 215. "Legal, Historically-Justified Semi-Nudity/Abnormal, Professionally-Appraised Perversion" (歴史的正当性を行使した合法半裸及び職人的見地から語る変態の異常性, Rekishiteki seitō-sei o kōshi shita gōhō hanra oyobi shokuninteki kenchi kara kataru hentai no ijōsei)
23	August 12, 2025	978-4-06-540009-8; 978-4-06-540008-1 (LE)	January 6, 2026 (digital); July 28, 2026 (print)	979-8-89478-836-4 (digital); 979-8-88877-859-3 (print)
216. "Uncontrollable Motion" (アンコントロール・モーション, Ankontorōru mōshon); 217. "The Unintended Celebrity Tax" (有名税は意図せずして, Yūmei zei wa ito sezu shite); 218. "Two Heroes of Battle, After The Dream" (つわものどものゆめのあと, Tsuwa monodomo no yume no ato); 219. "The Probable "Reach The Goal"World Speedrun Record" (目的地到達RTA、多分世界記録, Mokutekichi tōtatsu RTA, tabun sekai kiroku); 220. "The Underdog Who Struggled in Disgrace" (見苦しくも足掻いた噛ませ犬の物語, Migurushiku mo agaita kama se inu no monogatari); 221. "Every Second Becomes History, Standing Idly By or Not" (案山子ではなく、その一分一秒が歴史となる, Kakashide wa naku, sono ippun'ichibyō ga rekishi to naru); 222. "Power-of-Information Attack!!!!" (インフォメーションパワー・アタック!!!!!, Infomēshon pawā atakku!!!!!); 223. "Cross-Counter of Information" (インフォメーション・クロスカウンター, Infomēshon kurosu kauntā); 224. "Pernicious, Seditious Stoppages" (手痛い停滞って一体, Teitai teitai tte ittai); 225. "The Price of Strength, Accepted with Eyes Like Fire" (強者の代償、されどその目は烈火の如く, Tsuwamono no daishō, saredo sono-me wa rekka nogotoku)
24	October 17, 2025	978-4-06-541109-4; 978-4-06-541110-0 (LE)	March 24, 2026 (digital); January 26, 2027 (print)	979-8-89830-038-8 (digital); 979-8-88877-918-7 (print)
226. "The Golden Moon, Blue and Frigid" (黄金の月よ、青く冷たく, Ōgon no tsuki yo, aoku tsumetaku); 227. "Real Men Embrace the Black, No Matter the Cost" (男なら黒に染まれ、その身滅びども, Otokonara kuro ni somare, sono mi horobidomo); 228. "The More Insane the Hardcore Content, the More Fun It Is" (やり込み要素は狂気の沙汰ほど面白い, Yarikomi yōso wa kyōki no sata hodo omoshiroi); 229. "The Wolf Wars Begin With Shattered" (狼争開幕、最初にガラスをぶち破れ, Okami arasoi kaimaku, saisho ni garasu o buchi yabure); 230. "The Wolf Wars Ratchet Up with a Killer Initiative" (狼争佳境・キレッキレのイニシアチブ, Ōkami kakyo ・ kirekkire no inishiachibu); 231. "The Wolf Wars Expand - Submit, or Be Banished" (狼争増援・服従か、追放か, Ōkami zōen: fukujū ka, tsuihou ka); 232. "The Wolf Wars Confirmed! Speaking with Your Fists Wins the Day" (狼争決着・結局最後は肉体言語, Ōkami araso ketchaku: Kekkyoku saigo wa nikutai gengo); 233. "Slip-Slash-Scramble" (スリップ・スラッシュ・スクランブル, Surippu surasshu sukuranburu); 234. "Now It Can Be Told! The Wimpy Yet Shockingly Strong "Zero"" (今明かされる衝撃のクソザコストロング「ゼロ」, Ima akasa reru shōgeki no kuso zako sutorongu "Zero"); 235. "The Complete Transfer of Momentum via Core Targeting and Attainment of Flight via Indirect Kinetic Energy" (芯に捉える事による運動量の完全伝達と運動エネルギーを他者に依存した飛翔, Shin ni toraeru koto ni yoru undōryō no kanzen dentatsu to undō enerugī o tasha ni izon shita hishō)
25	January 16, 2026	978-4-06-542212-0; 978-4-06-542213-7 (LE)	June 26, 2026 (digital)	979-8-89830-110-1
236. "Know Thine Enemy, Know Thyself, and Victory Is Thine" (敵を知り己を知れば百戦危うからず？, Teki o shiri onore o shireba hyakusen ayaukarazu?); 237. "Letting Even the Wickedest of Thoughts by" (邪念岩をも通す, Janen iwa o mo tōsu); 238. "Assemble, Defenders, Against the Advancing Snake of Loathing" (集え防人、彼方より来たるは怨讐の蛇, Tsudoe sakimori, kanata yori kitaru wa onshū no hebi); 239. "An Unbending Heart, Even Amid Backbreaking Labor" (身体砕けど心は割れず, Karada kudakedo kokoro wa warezu); 240. "Disaster so Tantalizingly Close at Hand" (喉から手が出る程に災禍, Nodo kara te ga deru hodo ni saika); 241. "Naked Murder" (ネイキッド・マーダー, Neikiddo mādā); 242. "Moonlight for the Moonless Underworld" (月無き地底に月光を, Tsuki naki chitei ni gekkō o); 243. "Multitasking Prestissimo" (マルチタスク・プレスティッシモ, Maruchitasuku puresutisshimo); 244. "The Snake Devouring Out-and-Out Hatred" (徹頭徹尾の憎悪を食む蛇, Tettōtetsubi no zōo o hamu hebi); 245. "A Tongue That Knows Only How to Incite" (その舌は煽りの他を知らぬが故に, Sono shita wa aori no hoka o shiranuga yueni)
26	April 16, 2026	978-4-06-543321-8; 978-4-06-543324-9 (LE)	—	—
246. "The Battering, Bruising Game of Tag" (満身創痍の鬼ごっこ, Manshin sōi no onigokko); 247. "A Well of Hatred That Never Runs Dry" (汲めども尽きぬ、嫌悪の睥睨, Kumedomo tsukinu, ken'o no heigei); 248. "A Loss Greater Than Mere Defeat" (敗北だけが負けじゃない, Haiboku dake ga make janai); 249. "An Important-Seeming, But Actually Merely Sort Of Important Truth" (重要そうで重要でない少し重要な事実, Jūyō-sōde jūyōdenai sukoshi jūyōna jijitsu); 250. "That Old, Rusty Sword was Stuck In There a Long Time Ago" (錆びた剣ならあるのさ、ずいぶん前に突き刺さった, Sabita ken'nara aru no sa, zuibun mae ni tsukisasatta); 251. "Afterglow of a Hero" (英傑の残照, Eiketsu no zanshō); 252. "Let the Wolves Consume Each Other" (いざ食らい合え狼共よ, Iza kurai ae ōkamidomo yo); 253. "Faithfully in Bad Faith" (誠実なほどに不誠実, Seijitsuna hodo ni fuseijitsu); 254. "A Mechanical Strike on the Lawless Schwarz" (ルール無用の黒狼(ヴォルフシュバルツ)に、機械のパンチをぶちかませ, Rūru muyō no kuro ōkami (Vorufushubarutsu) ni, kikai no panchi o buchikamase); 255. "Time and Money Can Make Any Situation Look Good for You" (人は時間と金があれば大抵の出来事に対して有利を取れる, Hito wa jikan to kin ga areba taitei no dekigoto ni taishite yūri o toreru)
27	July 16, 2026	978-4-06-544341-5	—	—
256. "Scrap and Build" (スクラップアンドビルド, Sukurappu ando Birudo); 257. "Sword Wolf Against Lightning Flame Beast (Part 1)" (剣狼相対すは雷火の獣 其の一, Kenrō Sōtai su wa Raika no Kemono Sono Ichi); 258. "Sword Wolf Against Lightning Flame Beast (Part 2)" (剣狼相対すは雷火の獣 其の二, Kenrō Sōtai su wa Raika no Kemono Sono Ni); 259. "Sword Wolf Against Lightning Flame Beast (Part 3)" (剣狼相対すは雷火の獣 其の三, Kenrō Sōtai su wa Raika no Kemono Sono San); 260. "Sword Wolf Against Lightning Flame Beast (Part 4)" (剣狼相対すは雷火の獣 其の四, Kenrō Sōtai su wa Raika no Kemono Sono Shi); 261. "Sword Wolf Against Lightning Flame Beast (Part 5)" (剣狼相対すは雷火の獣 其の五, Kenrō Sōtai su wa Raika no Kemono Sono Go); 262. "Sword Wolf Against Lightning Flame Beast (Part 6)" (剣狼相対すは雷火の獣 其の六, Kenrō Sōtai su wa Raika no Kemono Sono Roku); 263. "Sword Wolf Against Lightning Flame Beast (Part 7)" (剣狼相対すは雷火の獣 其の七, Kenrō Sōtai su wa Raika no Kemono Sono Nana); 264. "Sword Wolf Against Lightning Flame Beast (Part 8)" (剣狼相対すは雷火の獣 其の八, Kenrō Sōtai su wa Raika no Kemono Sono Hachi); 265. "Sword Wolf Against Lightning Flame Beast (Part 9)" (剣狼相対すは雷火の獣 其の九, Kenrō Sōtai su wa Raika no Kemono Sono Kyū)
28	October 16, 2026	978-4-06-545275-2	—	—
266. "Sword Wolf Against Lightning Flame Beast (Part 10)" (剣狼相対すは雷火の獣 其の十, Kenrō Sōtai su wa Raika no Kemono Sono Jū); 267. "Sword Wolf Against Lightning Flame Beast (Part 11)" (剣狼相対すは雷火の獣 其の十一, Kenrō Sōtai su wa Raika no Kemono Sono Jū Ichi); 268. "Sword Wolf Against Lightning Flame Beast (Part 12)" (剣狼相対すは雷火の獣 其の十二, Kenrō Sōtai su wa Raika no Kemono Sono Jū Ni); 269. "Sword Wolf Against Lightning Flame Beast (Part 13)" (剣狼相対すは雷火の獣 其の十三, Kenrō Sōtai su wa Raika no Kemono Sono Jū San); 270. "Sword Wolf Against Lightning Flame Beast (Part 14)" (剣狼相対すは雷火の獣 其の十四, Kenrō Sōtai su wa Raika no Kemono Sono Jū Yon); 271. "Sword Wolf Against Lightning Flame Beast (Part 15)" (剣狼相対すは雷火の獣 其の十五, Kenrō Sōtai su wa Raika no Kemono Sono Jū Go); 272. "Sword Wolf Against Lightning Flame Beast (Part 15)" (剣狼相対すは雷火の獣 其の十六, Kenrō Sōtai su wa Raika no Kemono Sono Jū Roku); 273. "The S Swords Stands Tall By Its Own Will" (剣は己の意思で立つ, Ken wa Onore no Ishi de Tatsu); 274. "The Lewd VS. The Saintly" (痴女相対するは聖なる乙女, Chijo Aitaisuru wa Seinaru Otome); 275. "A Curse-Spreading Wound" (それは呪いを放つ傷, Sore wa Noroi o Hanatsu Kizu)

== Chapters not yet in tankōbon format ==
- 276. "The World Advances, Even Without Their Presence" (その者居ずとも世界は進む, Sono Mono izu Tomo Sekai wa Susumu)
- 277. "Epilogue – The Spreading Dragon Blight Battle" (エピローグ 広がる竜災戦禍, Epirōgu Hirogaru Ryū Wazawai Senka)
- 278. "There are Two Continents" (大陸は二つある, Tairiku wa Futatsu aru)
- 279. "My Girl Power Level is 530,000" (私の女子力は53万です, Watashi no Joshiryoku wa Gojūmankūsen Desu)
- 280. "Like Icarus Charging Into the Sun’s Curtain of Light" (太陽の暖簾に全力で突っ込むイカロスのような, Taiyō no Noren ni Zenryoku de Tsukkomu Ikarosu no Yōna)
- 281. "The Half-Naked, Long-Legged Bird Dude[-ette]" (半裸の足長お兄さん（鳥頭）, Hanra no Sokuchō Onīsan (Tori Atama))
- 282. "That's the Whole Problem" (お前そういうところだぞ, Omae Sōiu Tokoro da zo)
- 283. "And Was I Wrong for Being There?" (そこに立っていた俺が悪いと？, Soko ni Tatte Ita ore ga Warui to?)
- 284. "Dreams Inherited" (受け継がれる夢, Uketsugareru Yume)
- 285. "Fleeting Encounter" (セツナノコウサ, Setsuna no Kousa)
- 286. "Apple Aromas Forming Strange Bedfellows" (合縁奇縁は林檎の香り, Aienkien wa Ringo no Kaori)
- 287. "The Girl Crowned the Fastest" (最速を冠する少女, Saisoku o Kansuru Shōjo)
