= Moodgadget =

Music label

- Founded: 2004
- Founder: Jakub Marek Alexander; Adam E. Hunt
- Genre: Electronic
- Country of origin: U.S.
- Location: Brooklyn, New York; Ann Arbor, Michigan
- Official website: www.moodgadget.com

Moodgadget is an independent electronic music label with the mission of exposing the diversity in electronically made music. Founded in 2004 in Ann Arbor, Michigan by Jakub Alexander and Adam E. Hunt, the label began as an effort to popularize the founders' opinion that electronic music is a process, not a genre; within its walls live a diverse range of sounds, which would be documented over the course of the label's development.

The label is based in Brooklyn, New York, with Jakub and Adam sharing label management duties. Alexander handles A+R and Hunt serves as the mastering engineer and web designer. Design and artwork are provided by Alex Koplin, who joined the label in 2008. Design contributors include PhilistineDSGN, Adam E. Hunt, Jakub Alexander, Martyna Alexander, Ben Saginaw and Taro Yumiba.

== Artists ==
The following artists are or have been affiliated with Moodgadget.

- Benoît Pioulard
- Beacon
- Boreal Network
- Brael
- Casino Versus Japan
- Charles Trees
- D. Gookin
- Direwires
- Dykehouse
- Foxes in Fiction
- Frank Omura
- Isomer Transition
- JDSY
- Khonnor
- Kyle Bobby Dunn
- Kyson
- Machinedrum
- Mogi Grumbles
- Mux Mool
- New Villager
- Nitemoves
- Praveen
- The Reflecting Skin
- Seth Troxler
- Shigeto
- Small Sails
- Wisp

== Releases ==
=== Compilations ===
In 2006, Moodgadget released "The Rorschach Suite", a 20-song compilation. It reached #17 in iTunes electronic music section, and the single "Lost and Found" by Mux Mool was selected for the "Best of iTunes 2006." In 2008, Moodgadget released two compilations, "The Synchronicity Suite" and "No New Enemies Vol. 1" both made it into the top 30 in iTunes' electronic music section.

=== Limited and premiere ===
The label has made use of the donation sales method popularized by Radiohead for their Limited and Premiere releases. Limited releases are those by established artists, and Premiere releases are those by new artists; both allow the customer to choose their own price.

== Distribution ==
Moodgadet are partnered with The Orchard for distribution through online music retailers, including: iTunes, Amazon, and Beatport. They have also utilized the controversial technology BitTorrent, and it is their opinion that music is increasingly becoming a promotional tool for touring, merchandising and licensing.

== Licensing ==
Moodgadget has licensed music through Jeremy Peters and GHO (a subsidiary of Ghostly International) to LG, and Prada.
