= Albert Asriyan =

Armenian musician (1951–2007)

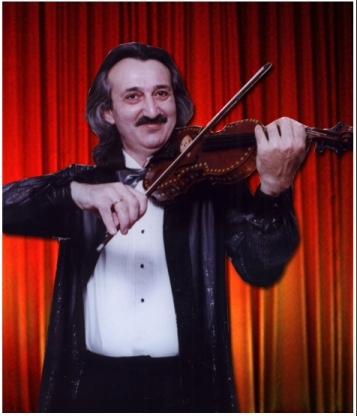
Albert Asriyan

Albert Asriyan (Armenian: Ալբերտ Ասրիյան, Russian: Альберт Асриян) (June 28, 1951 – November 28, 2007) was an Armenian-American violinist, composer, arranger and band leader.

== Childhood ==
Albert Asriyan was born in Baku, Azerbaijan SSR on June 28, 1951, to an Armenian family, as the first of three children. Albert's father, Mikhail Asriyan was a circus administrator and his mother, Sirvart Karnezian-Asriyan, a housewife. Growing up in a tough neighborhood in Baku, Albert was enrolled in music school at age 7 where he majored in classical violin and classical piano. After graduating from music school with honors at age 15, in 1966 he was accepted to the Azerbaijan State Musical College Asaf Zeinally, where he majored in classical violin and piano.

During his studies at Zeinally, Asriyan developed a love for jazz. Purchasing bootleg copies of jazz greats such as Louis Armstrong, Ella Fitzgerald, Billie Holiday, Dizzy Gillespie, Duke Ellington, and performing at local gigs in youth music group Chaika (English: Seagull), as well as in Volshebniye Zvuki (English: Magic Sounds). At the same time, Asriyan picked up the guitar and began studying by listening to Santana.

In 1971, Asriyan entered the Baku Academy of Music majoring in classical violin and minoring in piano/music composition. His talent as a composer and arranger always found use in conservatory "Kapustnik" (English: Musical Comedy Club). During his years at the conservatory, Asriyan also played on the conservatory basketball team. He graduated in 1976 and turned professional.

== Career in Baku ==
After graduating from the conservatory, Asriyan joined the USSR Navy where he became a part of the Orchestra of the Red Banner Caspian Navy as a violinist and guitarist. In 1977 he joined the Jazz Band of the Philharmonic Society of Baku in the groups Sevgilim (English: Loved one) and AzConcert's "Ashugi" (English: Poets in Love). During this time he performed in Azerbaijan and other republics of the Soviet Union. Aside from Soviet music, the groups performed many popular foreign songs such as that of James Brown and Chick Corea, despite controversy and strict disapproval of the music committee.

With his friends and colleagues Elkhan Shikhaliev saxophonist/composer/arranger/vocalist, Siyavush Kerimi oud/keyboars, Rauf Sultanov bass, Ramin Sultanov drums, Mukhtar Yakhyayev keyboards, Yuriy Tagiev vocals, Karen Avanesyan (entertainer, comedian, actor) and other musicians, Asriyan toured all over the USSR.

From 1979 to 1983 he was one of the first violins of Azerbaijan Radio and TV Symphonic Orchestra conducted by Ramiz Melik Aslanov. During this time he also performed with several pop-groups and was the band leader of group Bakinskiye Devushki (English: Girls of Baku) where in 1979 he met his future wife Ivetta Mirzoyan, a singer and guitarist of the girls group. Asriyan and Ivetta went on to play together in pop-group Muleili. On April 21, 1980, they married, and had a daughter, Julie Anna, in 1983.

In 1983 Asriyan became an arranger and keyboard player for the pop/folk group Ashugi.

From 1984 to 1989 he was the arranger/ keyboarding/ violinist/ jazz vocalist of the State Orchestra Gaya (English: Mountain), conducted by Teymur Mirzoyev. Within Gaya formed a rock-group Talisman where Asriyan and his friend Elkhan Shikhaliev wrote and performed most of their compositions. He was the artistic leader of the group up to August, 1989. Talisman became a very well known and successful band, performing at the XII World Festival of Youth and Students in Moscow-1985. In 1986 Asriyan with "Gaya" and "Talisman" traveled to Kabul, Afghanistan to perform for the Soviet troops fighting in the war. The band also performed at major events such as the Rock Panorama of Baku-1988, Concert for the USSR government at Republic Concert Hall-Lenin Sarai in Baku, The State Central Concert Hall Russia in Moscow, Column Hall of the House of Unions at the Kremlin, as well as all over the country and outside.

Asriyan's song Bez Tebya (English: Without You), to which Ivetta wrote the lyrics, was performed at the 1987 International Music Festival in Jūrmala. The video to his song "Kuvshin" (English: Vase), directed by Sevinc Kerimova, became one of the first music videos to hit television in Azerbaijan and former USSR. Asriyan's songs were performed on television. Bez Tebya was performed at the New Year's Eve Celebrations of 1987–1988 in Baku and Fakir performed at the Song of the Year Annual Contest of USSR in Baku, 1987. His song " 80 thousand roses" was performed by Talisman at concerts and patriotic festivals in memory of World War 2. Asriyan was also the composer and performer for Azerbaijan TV Show Molodejnaya Estrada (Youth Stage) in 1979–1982, and for televised concert of Masters of Arts of Azerbaijan of 1988–1989. His song Kuvshin was the closing number.

== Career in Moscow ==
In 1989, due to civil conflict in Baku and after several attacks from the Azeri extremists, Asriyan moved with his family to Moscow, with the help of friends, where they lived from 1989 to 1993. Upon invitation of his childhood friend and colleague, composer Boris Vishnevkin, Asriyan became a part of the Jewish group Shabas and performed all over the former USSR. Together they recorded an album in Moscow. Asriyan performed solo with his own violin show for various events, and performed Armenian folk music with other musicians. On December 25, 1990, Albert and Ivetta had their second daughter, Kristina.

Asriyan applied for entry to the US with his extended family as refugees; they were granted entry in 1993.

== Career in the United States ==
On July 13, 1993, Asriyan and family arrived in New York City. Asriyan and his wife began to study English at a local school, and he performed at a local restaurant/club, Kavkaz (Caucasus). Asriyan performed for the Russian-speaking community in the US, along with Boka – Boris Davidian (vocalist), Karen Avanesyan (comedian, actor) and Igor Mirzoyan (clarinet), when they were visiting the US.

Asriyan became involved with the Diocese of the Armenian Church of America, volunteering to be the musical entertainment for all Church events. As part of the committee of the Russian-Armenian Church community, Albert directed the musical programs, concerts, and child/adult performances. The youth church group performed at several events, representing Armenian culture at live annual festivals including NYANA-New York Association for New Americans, Summer Armenian Festivals in New Rochelle, at St. Nersess Seminary, NY, St. Vartan Armenian Cathedral in New York, NY, Holy Martyrs Armenian Church Bayside Queens, NY, St. Mary Armenian Apostolic Church in New Jersey. Asriyan was awarded Certificates of Appreciation from the Primate, Archbishop Khajag Barsamian.

In 1996 Asriyan set up his own entertainment program, Albert's Show Orchestra, consisting of Albert Asriyan (artistic leader, violinist, vocalist, keyboardist, arranger, composer), his wife, Ivetta Asriyan (vocalist, songwriter), Robert Toniev (vocalist, keyboardist), Levon Mnatsakanian (vocalist), Arthur Gesiyan (guitar), Lev Yelisavetski (vocalist/keyboard), Eduard Kurchakov (saxophone), Isabelle-Bella Khanuka (vocalist) and other musicians. In 2000, Asriyan's daughters Julie Anna and Kristina, whom Albert had enrolled in music studies since childhood, joined Albert's Show Orchestra.

Asriyan was invited to perform at private and public events all over the US. He worked at several Russian clubs/restaurants in Brooklyn.

In 2000, Asriyan's musical instruments and stage equipment burned in a restaurant fire in Brighton Beach, Brooklyn. The fire destroyed his old Italian handmade violin, on which he had played since youth, and his collection of music recordings, music books, lyrics and notes. With the help of friends and family, he was able to purchase new instruments, keyboards, violins, and stage equipment; returning to the stage soon after.

From 2000, Asriyan worked as a violin and guitar teacher at the International Children's Center For Performing Arts in Brooklyn, NY, as a private teacher, and as a consultant and arranger/composer for a children's string orchestra conducted by his sister Ruzanna Akopjan (Рузанна Акопджан), in New Jersey. Asriyan was also the arranger/songwriter/music consultant for Allegretto Music and Art Studio run by his sister-in-law Ida Melik-Mirzakhan (Ида Мелик-Мирзахан), with whom he wrote several songs.

In 2005, Asriyan and Ida composed a requiem A moment of Silence to the lyrics of his niece Victoriya Melik-Mirzakhan and poetry of Ivetta and Ida's father Alexandr J. Mirzoyan. The requiem was performed by Ivetta (vocals), Igor Mirzoyan (clarinet and Armenian duduk), and Karine Kocharyan (Armenian poetry reading). Ardzagank Armenian TV created a video to the requiem which was broadcast nationally. The requiem was dedicated to Ida's son Alexander, who had been killed in an automobile accident at age 20 in 2003.

Asriyan enrolled his daughters into multiple music and art schools for music, dance and the performing arts. Asriyan and Ivetta's song Zvezdopad (Russian: Звездопад, English: Star Falls) performed by their daughter Kristina was entered into the Russian-American song-writing competition Moya Pesnya (Russian: Моя Песня, English: My Song) broadcast on Russian-American TV station RTVI and Russian Davidzon Radio Station in 2006. Kristina was the winner, and 2006 Artist of the Year of the Our Talented Children competition (Russian: Конкурс Наши Талантливые Дети). Asriyan accompanied Kristina at her solo performance of Summertime, by George Gershwin, at the Merkin Concert Hall at Kaufman Center in New York City, on March 25, 2007. Asriyan and Ivetta released several albums of their own music as well as Russian and Armenian music, including violin classics of Albert's Show, which were distributed among the Russian-Armenian community in the tri-state area.

On November 22, 2007, Asriyan was invited to Davidzon Radio Station- program Karavan for their Thanksgiving Day celebration to talk about his life, career, music, and plans.

== Death ==
Less than a week from his radio interview, on November 27, 2007, Asriyan became ill and was taken to the Coney Island Hospital in Brooklyn, NY. He died on November 28, 2007, at the age of 56.

The New York Daily News published an article about Albert Asriyan on December 7, 2007, reflecting on his life and contribution to music.
