= A Young Person's Guide to Kyle Bobby Dunn =

Studio album by Kyle Bobby Dunn
- Released: January 18, 2010
- Recorded: 2004–2009
- Genres: Ambient, drone
- Length: 1:52:45
- Label: Low Point
- Producer: Kyle Bobby Dunn

A Young Person's Guide to Kyle Bobby Dunn is a double album by Canadian composer Kyle Bobby Dunn. It was released on January 18, 2010, by the British label Low Point.

The album features extended drone-based compositions created using processed classical instruments, electric guitar, and piano. The majority of tracks exceed ten minutes in length, with two shorter piano vignettes included on the second disc.

Four tracks on the first disc were originally released in April 2009 as part of Dunn’s digital-only album Fervency on the Brooklyn-based Moodgadget label. The Low Point edition expanded on that release, adding over an hour of additional material.

== Reception ==
The album received positive reviews from music critics.

- Joe Tangari of Pitchfork rated it 7.5/10, describing it as "a massive, two-hour, 12-song cycle of drones and textures."
- Consequence of Sound praised Dunn’s use of orchestral instrumentation to create "ambient, electronic-sounding soundscapes."
- Boomkat highlighted its expanded scope, noting its "time-dilating" qualities and comparisons to Stars of the Lid.
- AllMusic also gave a favorable review, noting its scale and consistency.

== Track listing ==
=== Disc one ===
1. "Butel" – 17:30
2. "The Tributary (For Voices Lost)" – 10:38
3. "There Is No End (To Your Beauty)" – 14:34
4. "Promenade" – 9:08
5. "Small Show of Hands" – 4:12

=== Disc two ===
1. "Grab (And Its Lost Legacies)" – 11:34
2. "Empty Gazing" – 6:53
3. "Last Minute Jest" – 2:03
4. "The Second Ponderosa" – 9:11
5. "Bonaventure’s Finest Hour" – 10:55
6. "Sets of Four (Its Meaning Is Deeper Than Its Title Implies)" – 4:55
7. "The Nightjar" – 11:17
