= Michal Menert =

American music producer (born 1982)

- Born: June 10, 1982 (age 44); Kielce, Poland
- Origin: Fort Collins, Colorado
- Genres: Electronica, nu jazz, hip hop, soul, trip hop
- Occupation: Music producer
- Years active: 1997–present
- Labels: Voicebox; Pretty Lights Music; Super Best
- Member of: Fantastic Pretty Lights; Michal Menert & The Pretty Fantastics; Wooden Flowers
- Formerly of: Pretty Lights
- Website: menertmusic.com

Michal Menert (born June 10, 1982) is a Polish-born American electronic music producer and the founder of Super Best Records. He was also the first artist on the Pretty Lights Music label and was an integral part of Pretty Lights, producing Pretty Lights' debut album, Taking Up Your Precious Time as well as contributing to several tracks after his official departure from the project. Menert tours with a 7-piece band including MC, violin, and DJ.

== Early life ==
Michal Menert was born in Kielce, Poland, and spent his early years in Kraków, when Poland was still part of the Eastern Bloc, under the rule of the Soviet Union in the early 1980s. His parents were professionals in academia and industry, and would fill the house with banned books and Western music. His father, Tadeusz (Tad) Adam Menert, had a passion for music and played drums in a small Polish psych-rock band.

In 1986, he "was forced to leave Poland due to various political reasons", Tadeusz Menert later wrote. He and his family migrated to West Germany. From there they migrated to the United States in 1987 with the help of a sponsor they met through Antic's letter column, and moved to Loveland, Colorado, where Tadeusz Menert became a librarian at the Larimer County Detention Center.

Menert started skateboarding with Derek Vincent Smith in the 8th grade. The pair, together with a drummer Menert knew, began making music after Smith brought a bass guitar to skating session. In his freshman year of high school Menert met Paul Brandt who eventually replaced their original drummer. Calling themselves "The Freeze", the band consisted of Derek Vincent Smith on the bass guitar, Michal Menert on the guitar and keyboard, and Paul Brandt on the drums. The group was influenced by artists like the Beastie Boys, Tha Alkaholiks, A Tribe Called Quest, Wu-Tang Clan, The Roots, and The Casualties as well as by old school hip hop, funk, punk rock, and the skater culture. The band placed second in a community battle of bands in their sophomore year.

== Career ==
=== Early 2000s: May to December ===
After high school Menert attended college for one year with Smith and Brandt. In the early 2000s, under the name AES, Michal began producing hip hop music both on his own as well as with friends in the music groups Gone, Listen (stylized Listen.), and Makeshift Gods. Menert's first solo album, May to December was released on April 27, 2003 In repayment of back rent for studio time, Menert worked part-time with Derek Vincent Smith as an engineer at Morningwood Studios in Fort Collins.

=== 2004–2006: Taking Up Your Precious Time ===
Derek Vincent Smith and Michal Menert began working on Pretty Lights as a side project in the summer of 2004, producing the first album, Taking Up Your Precious Time in 2005 while on a trip to Europe. The album was released the following October. Believing it did not make sense to charge for a product that individuals would simply rip off the internet, Menert and Smith mimicked the business model of Steely Dan by releasing the album for free. They hoped that the music would catch on and they could make money playing shows. As a side project the pair did not feel any pressure to make money on the music. Menert and Smith initially promoted the album by reverse searching people's music interests on Myspace and sending messages to them about the free album.

On December 7, 2006, twenty-four-year-old Michal Menert was robbed at gunpoint and severely injured by three Loveland, Colorado gang members during a drug deal. Menert fled the scene and was found by police on a sidewalk in downtown Loveland. He was admitted to McKee Medical Center in Loveland with a stab wound in the chest just missing his heart and a tip to wrist laceration with tendon damage on his dominant hand. While Menert was in the hospital, Pretty Lights was becoming more well known and after discussion Derek Vincent Smith proceeded with the project on his own.

=== 2007–2011: Dreaming of a Bigger Life ===
After Menert left the hospital in 2007 he learned his father, who had previously been diagnosed with cancer, had become more sick and needed a caregiver. While caring for his father, Michal collaborated with friend Benjamin O'Neill on a never released project called The Years in 2007 and 2008 and worked with Paul Brandt on their collaboration Half Color in 2008. A few years later (c.a. 2009) on his way to his first show after his injury, Menert was pulled over for swerving and arrested for distributing narcotics to an undercover officer two years prior. Pleading guilty to a lesser charge, Menert was sentenced to three years of probation, six months in prison, and 200 hours of community service. Due to his father's declining health Menert served his six months under house arrest rather than in prison.

While taking care of his father and under house arrest, Menert worked at Walmart and produced his album Dreaming of a Bigger Life. By spring 2010, Derek Vincent Smith had produced two solo albums under the name Pretty Lights and the project had undergone a shift in sound. Rather than rejoin Pretty Lights, Menert chose to create a solo project under his own name. On June 8, 2010, one week after his father's death due to cancer, Menert released Dreaming of a Bigger Life for free as the first album of the newly formed Pretty Lights Music label. Menert's debut live performance was at the 2010 Sonic Bloom music festival in Bellevue, Colorado.

=== 2012–2014: Even If It Isn't Right ===
Menert released his 27-track album Even If It Isn't Right on April 24, 2012. Collaborating artists on the album include SuperVision, Paul Basic, and Derek VanScoten.

From November 2012 to April 2013, Michal Menert released a four-part series of singles called Elements. A vinyl release followed in 2014.

=== 2015–present: Dream Season, Elements and Space Jazz ===
In April 2014, Elements was released as an EP on Super Best Records. Menert, described Elements as a tribute to alchemy. Elements became a name-your-price digital release followed by vinyl shortly after. Menert produced the album with Mux Mool.

Menert released Space Jazz on April 21, 2015. His first full-length album since "Even If It Isn't Right" in 2012.

Starting in 2016, Menert established a working relationship with Grateful Dead percussionist Mickey Hart. Since then, he has worked at Hart's Studio X in California, co-produced his 2017 release 'Ramu,' and went on the road with Dead & Co as an Ableton engineer from 2017 to 2018.

In January 2016, Menert played Red Rocks Park & Amphitheater as Half Color along with Big Grams and Adventure Club, and later year in October 2016, he was back at Red Rocks with The Floozies.

Space Jazz was released on vinyl February 19, 2016.

In August 2017, Menert reunited with Derek Vincent Smith and joined Pretty Lights at The Gorge Amphitheatre in Washington.

In 2018, Menert released his solo record Slow Coast 2 & in 2019, Slow Coast 3, which both consisted of downtempo soundscapes inspired by living on Northern California coast.

Michal Menert & the Pretty Fantastics delivered '1' in Fall 2016 and with an updated lineup, released 'From the Sea in November 2018.

== Super Best Records ==
Michal Menert works with producers he chooses for his own record label, Super Best Records. Super Best Records roster currently include Late Night Radio, KEEPLOVE?, JK Soul, Shuj Roswell, Mux Mool, Maddy O'Neal (formerly from Krooked Drivers), The PARTY People, Tnertle, Willdabeast.

== Michal Menert Big Band ==
The Michal Menert Big Band – an 18-piece ensemble led by Menert – debuted in 2014. The band has performed Menert's catalog to large audiences at notable locations including a November 2014 performance at Fillmore Auditorium in Denver and an April 2015 performance at Colorado's Red Rocks Amphitheatre. Menert also played at Red Rocks Amphitheatre with the Floozies in October 2016 as well as many notable summer music festivals such as Summer Camp Music Festival and Sonic Bloom Music Festival.

== Michal Menert & the Pretty Fantastics ==
Michal Menert & the Pretty Fantastics debuted in 2015. This is a 7-piece band made up of Menert on keys, bass & samples, as well as a DJ, violinist, and MC. Other current members: Matt VanDenHeuvel, Nicholas Gerlach, Jules Thoma, Richard 'Sleepy' Floyd, Jason Scholla, and Borntown Macleod

In 2016, the Pretty Fantastics released their first full-length album '1' followed by 'From the Sea' in November 2018.

Michal Menert & the Pretty Fantastics first played at Red Rocks on September 9, 2017, with STS9 and again on August 10, 2018, with Pretty Lights.

== Discography ==
Michal Menert discography
Title	Album details	Notes	References
Invisible People	Released: 2003; Label: Voicebox Records; Formats: Vinyl	as AES in the "Makeshift Gods"	
May To December	Released: 2003; Label: Voicebox Records; Formats: Compact Disc	as AES	
Autumn	Released: 2005; Label: None; Formats: Digital	with Derek Vincent Smith	
Taking Up Your Precious Time	Released: 2006; Label: Pretty Lights Music; Formats: CD, Digital	as part of Pretty Lights with Derek Vincent Smith	
Dreaming of A Bigger Life	Released: 2010; Label: Pretty Lights Music; Formats: Digital	with tracks co-produced by Paul Basic	
Even If It Isn't Right	Released: 2012; Label: Pretty Lights Music; Formats: Digital	with tracks co-produced by SuperVision, Derek VanScoten, Paul Basic, and Outlet	
Twilight Frequency	Released: 2012; Label: None; Formats: Digital	with Break Science	
Elements	Released: December 2014 (digital), April 2014 (vinyl); Label: Super Best Records; Formats: Digital, vinyl	Released as a series of singles from November 2012 to April 2013. A vinyl EP was released in 2014.	
Dream Season	Released: 2015; Label: Super Best Records; Formats: Digital	as part of "Half Color" with Paul Basic	
Space Jazz	Released: 2015; Label: Super Best Records; Formats: Digital, Compact Disc, Vinyl		
Michal Menert and the pretty fantastics 1	Released: 2015; Label: Super Best Records; Formats: Digital, Compact Disc		
From The Sea	Released: 2018; Label: Super Best Records; Formats: Digital, Compact Disc, Vinyl	With the Pretty Fantastics	
Slow Coast II EP	Released: 2018; Label: Super Best Records; Formats: Digital	Downtempo soundscapes inspired by living on Northern California coast	
Slow Coast III EP	Released: 2019; Label: Super Best Records; Formats: Digital	Downtempo soundscapes inspired by living on Northern California coast	
