= Pretty Lights =

American electronic music producer (born 1981)

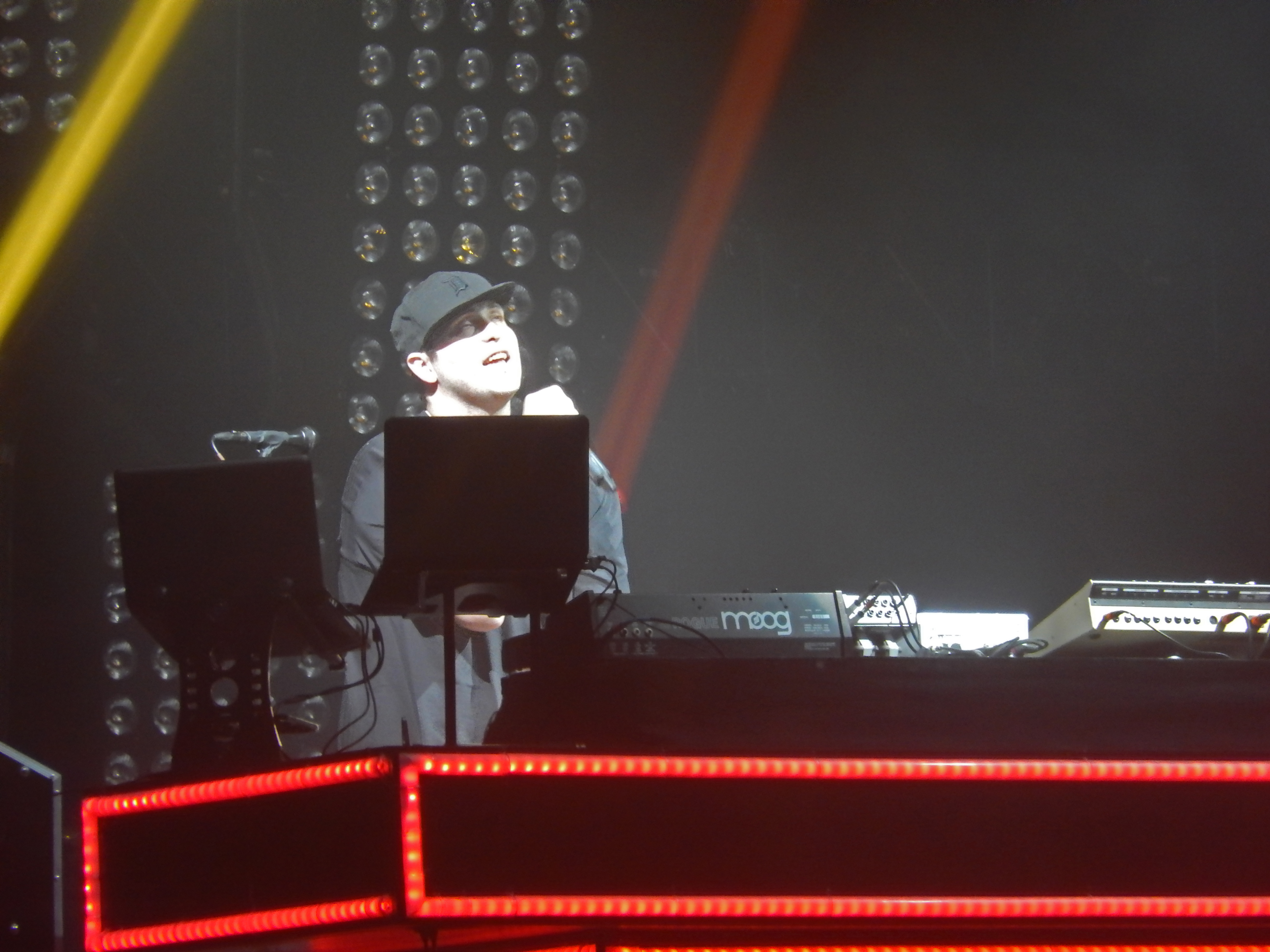
- Pretty Lights performing in 2013

Background information
- Also known as: Derek Vincent Smith
- Origin: Fort Collins, Colorado
- Genres: Electronic; hip hop; soul
- Years active: 2004–2018; 2023-present
- Labels: Pretty Lights Music, 8 Minutes 20 Seconds Records
- Members: Derek Vincent Smith; Michal Menert; Borahm Lee; Alvin Ford Jr. David Najarian
- Past members: Brian Coogan; Cory Eberhard; Adam Deitch; Brandon Butler; Eric Bloom; Scott Flynn; Eric Krasno; Chris Karns
- Website: prettylightsmusic.com

Derek Vincent Smith (born November 25, 1981), known by his stage name Pretty Lights, is an American electronic music producer. Pretty Lights was originally a music project consisting of Smith and Michal Menert, who left after the release of their first album and returned in 2023. Rick Rubin once described Pretty Lights as "the face and voice of the new American electronic music scene".

== Early life ==
Smith started skateboarding with Michal Menert in the 8th grade. The pair, together with a drummer Menert knew, began making music after Smith brought a bass guitar to a skating session. Paul Brandt (Paul Basic) eventually replaced their original drummer. Calling themselves "The Freeze", the band consisted of Derek Vincent Smith on the bass guitar, Michal Menert on the guitar and keyboard, and Paul Brandt on the drums. The group was influenced by artists like the Beastie Boys, Tha Alkaholiks, A Tribe Called Quest, Wu-Tang Clan, The Roots, and The Casualties as well as by old school hip hop, funk, punk rock, and the skater culture. The band placed second in a community battle of bands in their sophomore year. After graduating from Rocky Mountain High School, Smith attended University of Colorado at Boulder, but dropped out during his freshman year to focus on his music instead.

== Career ==
=== 2004–2009 ===
Derek Vincent Smith and Michal Menert began working on Pretty Lights in summer 2004. In 2007 and 2008, Pretty Lights began playing late nights for large acts such as STS9, The Disco Biscuits, and Widespread Panic. Some of his first appearances outside of Colorado were at the end of 2008 on October 31 at Club 6 in San Francisco, CA, November 14 at The Parish Room in Austin, Texas, December 6–7 in Fayetteville, Arkansas at the former venue known as The Gypsy, and a December 20 show in Richmond, Virginia at the Canal Club. In the summer of 2009, under the moniker Pretty Lights, Smith played at several major American music festivals, such as Bonnaroo, Forecastle, Wakarusa, Rothbury, Electric Daisy Carnival, Camp Bisco, and the 10KLF. The following autumn, he went on a multi-city tour of the United States.

=== 2010–2011: Pretty Lights Music ===
In 2010, Pretty Lights played at the 2010 Coachella Valley Music and Arts Festival, the Ultra Music Festival in Miami, the 2010 Marchone Music Productions Illumination Show in Nashville, the 2010 Evolve Festival in Nova Scotia, Movement 2010 (the Detroit Electronic Music Festival), the 2010 Starscape Festival, Camp Bisco, Nocturnal Festival at Apache Pass, Texas, the 2010 Electric Zoo at Randall's Island in New York City, New York, the North Coast Music Festival in Chicago, Illinois, and the Outsidelands Festival in San Francisco, California. In early 2011, he headlined SnowBall in Avon, Colorado, along with Bassnectar and the Flaming Lips. In June 2011, Pretty Lights played a late-night set at Bonnaroo, where he debuted the song "I Know the Truth." Smith also debuted his state-of-the-art light show in early 2011 involving LED towers made to look like a cityscape. The design was conceived by future band collaborator David Najarian and his company RadioEditAV. In July 2011, he headlined at the Electric Forest in Rothbury, Michigan, at Camp Bisco in Mariaville, New York, and at the All Good Music Festival in Masontown, West Virginia, where he performed a special "once in a lifetime" track, a remix of John Denver's "Take Me Home, Country Roads."

Smith toured with drummer Cory Eberhard from August 2007 to July 2010. In late July 2010, Smith replaced Eberhard with Adam Deitch as drummer, debuting at Wanderlust on July 30. Smith stopped touring with a live drummer in 2011.

On January 25, 2011, Smith released two albums on his newly formed record label, Pretty Lights Music. The record label offers free downloads of all Pretty Lights albums, plus releases from PLM artists including Michal Menert, Break Science, Gramatik, Paul Basic, Eliot Lipp, and SuperVision. Pretty Lights continues to distribute music for free, and frequently appears at festivals across the world.

=== 2012–2013: A Color Map of the Sun and the Analog Future Band ===
In 2012, Pretty Lights was featured in the musical documentary "Re:GENERATION Music Project" producing the track "Wayfaring Stranger," featuring Country music stars LeAnn Rimes and Ralph Stanley for a collaborative effort mixing two genres, namely electronic and country.

Pretty Lights released a new full-length album titled A Color Map of the Sun on July 2, 2013. It is the first Pretty Lights album that does not rely on borrowed samples; Smith instead composed and recorded tracks with session musicians in studios in Brooklyn, New Orleans and Denver and pressed the recordings to vinyl, samples of which were then combined with modular synths and digital production methods. For his fall 2013 tour, Smith toured with a full band including drummer Adam Deitch, keyboardist Brian Coogan, keyboardist Borahm Lee, trombonist Scott Flynn and trumpeter Eric Bloom.

On December 6, 2013, A Color Map of the Sun received a nomination for Best Dance/Electronica Album in the 2014 Grammys. On December 10, 2013, Pretty Lights released A Color Map of the Sun Remixes.

=== 2014–2018: New Orleans reinvention and Pretty Lights Live ===
Following the 2014 Grammy Awards, Smith relocated to Los Angeles to begin work on a new album at Rick Rubin's Shangri-La studio. After several months of writing and recording, Smith relocated to New Orleans in mid-2014. Over the following two years, Smith recorded music with local musicians and played sporadic shows with the Analog Future Band.

In 2015, Pretty Lights headlined the Suwannee Hulaween music festival the last weekend of October.

Following Analog Future's final show at New Orleans' Buku Music + Art Project in March 2016, Smith formed the new band Pretty Lights Live. The new band features Smith, drummer Alvin Ford Jr., keyboardist Brian Coogan, keyboardist Borahm Lee, and turntablist Chris Karns. On May 31, 2016, Smith announced that the band would embark on a five-stop "Episodic Festival" U.S. tour with two-day stops in Gilford, NH, Morrison, CO, Telluride, CO, Chicago, IL, and Nashville, TN. Shortly after, Coogan left the band and was replaced by Brandon Butler.

In late 2016, Smith revealed that he was working on his first new album in four years, with a tentative release date set for April 2017. Pretty Lights Live is slated to play at several major U.S. music festivals in 2017, including Summer Camp Music Festival in May and Camp Bisco in July. The band then performed in Detroit, MI, Minneapolis, MN, and Philadelphia, PA, over the New Year's holiday period.

"[T]he only shows of the summer, [and] possibly all" of 2018 took place at Red Rocks Amphitheatre on August 10 and 11, celebrating the tenth consecutive year of Pretty Lights performing there.

Shortly after his 10th year anniversary shows at the Red Rocks Amphitheater, Smith took a break to focus on himself and his music.

=== 2023–present: Swirl Bridge Era ===
On April 4, 2023, after a nearly 5 year hiatus, he announced a return tour, entitled "The Soundship Spacesystem Tour" with 27+ dates across the country, with 4 band members, Borahm Lee, Chris Karns, Alvin Ford Jr., and the returning Michal Menert, together referred to as the Pretty Lights Live Band.

In 2024, they followed up their comeback tour with 8 multi-stop runs dubbed the "Check Your Vector" Tour with stops at Hampton, Bethel, Red Rocks, Lake Tahoe, Las Vegas, St Augustine, Boston, and Minneapolis as well as festival appearances at Bonnaroo and Austin City Limits.

2025 brought two additional festival appearances, as well as the inaugural Yahn Dawn at Meadow Creek—Pretty Lights' own multi-day camping festival in Buena Vista, Colorado. At this festival, Smith announced that he and his wife were expecting a son which indicated a slower concert circuit for the remainder of 2025.

In July of 2026, Smith announced the project's first full-length studio album in 13 years titled A Trip Thru Time Fantastic. Comprising more than 45 songs across nine separate releases (dubbed "constellations"), the album is set to usher in a new chapter for the project and a new iteration of the live band.

== Style ==
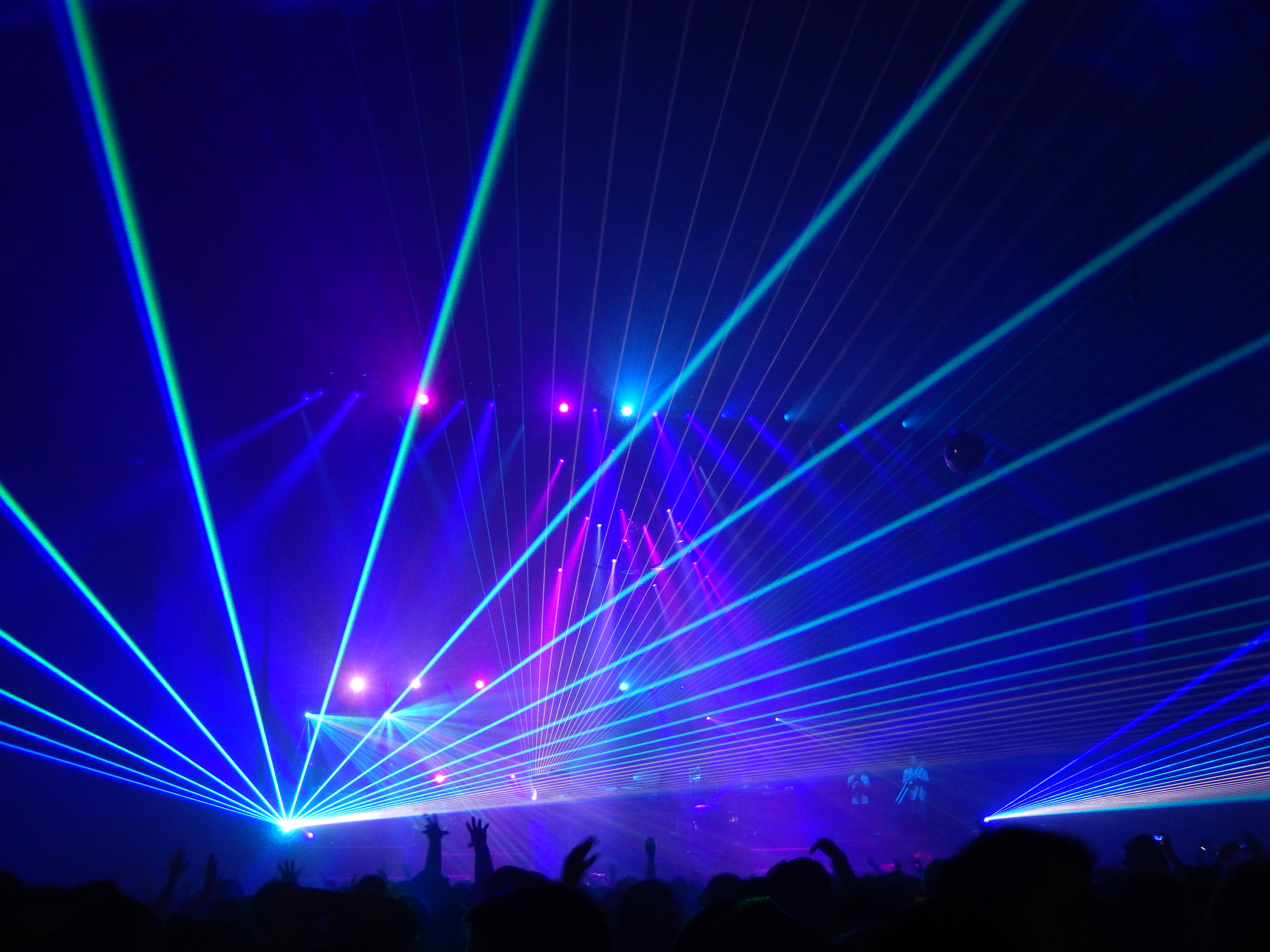
Pretty Lights at the Aragon Ballroom in November 2013

Smith's music relies heavily on digital sampling and crosses many genres, forming a combination of "glitchy hip-hop beats, buzzing synth lines, and vintage funk and soul samples". Pretty Lights's sound is generated by manipulating samples and organic beats using the Novation X-Station, Monome and the Akai MPD32. Smith uses these digital controllers to program the music production software Ableton Live 8. When performing live, Smith uses two Macbook Pros running Ableton Live 8 and two Akai MPD32s. Smith usually considers his music as "Electro Hip-Hop Soul", a mix between elements of electronic based music, and beats from hip-hop and soul music.

== Members ==
- Derek Vincent Smith - production, instrumentation, vocals (2004–present)
- Michal Menert - production, instrumentation, vocals (2004-2010) (2023-present)
- Borahm Lee (Break Science) - production, keyboards, synthesizers (2014–present)
- Alvin Ford Jr - drums (2016-present)
- David Najarian - production, turntables, stage design (2009-2015) (2026–present)

=== Former members ===
- Cory Eberhard - drums (2007–2010)
- Adam Deitch - drums (2010–2016)
- Brandon Butler - keyboards (2016–2018)
- Chris Karns (DMC World Champion) - turntables/sampling/video dj (2013–2026)
- Brian Coogan - keyboards (2013–2016)
- Scott Flynn - trombone (2013; sporadic appearances)
- Eric Bloom - trumpet (2013; sporadic appearances)
- Eric Krasno - guitar (sporadic appearances)

=== Production Team (past and present) ===
- Jake Roeber - lights (2026-present)
- Robert Fuller - light design (2026-present)
- Jason Starkey - sound engineer (2023-present)
- Eric Mintzer - visual design (2023-present)
- Mitch Stomner aka mechene.exe - visual design (2026-present)
- Griffin Birkins aka Spectrum One - visual design (2026-present)
- Dorian Weinzimmer - film crew (2016-present)
- Laine Kelley aka Mixed Media - film crew (2011-present)
- Greg "Lazer Shark" Ellis - lights, stage design (2009-2025)
- Jack Hurley aka Anti-Alias - visual design (2023-2026)
- Whit Hawkins - sound engineer (2009-2017)
- Ryan Berena - film crew (2015-2018)

== Discography ==
=== Studio albums ===
- Taking Up Your Precious Time (2006)
- Filling Up the City Skies (2008)
- Passing by Behind Your Eyes (2009)
- A Color Map of the Sun (2013)
- A Trip Thru Time Fantastic (2026)

=== EPs ===
- Making Up a Changing Mind (2010)
- Spilling Over Every Side (2010)
- Glowing in the Darkest Night (2010)
- The Hidden Shades (2014)
- Dual Fusion Unity (2023)

=== Live sets ===
- 2009: MORRISON, CO @ Red Rocks performing as Pretty Lights
- 2010: NYE 2009 (Midnight at The Vic Theatre)
- 2011: ALBUQUERQUE, NM - "I.D-Fest" (a.k.a. Identity Festival) @ The Pavilion)
- 2011: WASHINGTON ("I.D-Fest" a.k.a. Identity Festival) @ The Gorge)
- 2012: LAS VEGAS (Electric Daisy Carnival @ L.V. Motor Speedway)
- 2014: MORRISON, CO @ Red Rocks performed as "Pretty Lights Live" (Derek Vincent Smith was accompanied, in addition to his 7 band members, by a full Orchestral Symphony consisting of 28 members)
- 2017: 31 "Flips" from 2016 Episodic Tour

=== Compilations ===
- 2010: Defocused on the Bright Diamonds (Released by Joshua Davis)
- 2010: Unreleased 2010 Remixes
- 2017: Pretty Lights USB 2.0

=== Singles ===
- 2011: "Pretty Lights vs Radiohead vs Nirvana vs NIN"
- 2011: "I Know The Truth"
- 2011: "Pretty Lights vs Summertime"
- 2011: "Pretty Lights vs Led Zeppelin"
- 2012: "We Must Go On"
- 2012: "You Get High"
- 2012: "Pretty Lights vs The End Of The World"
- 2013: "The Day is Gone"
- 2013: "Around the Block" (featuring Talib Kweli)
- 2013: "Give Your Love Away"
- 2014: "Lost And Found"
- 2015: "DJ Sona's Ultimate Skin Music - Ethereal" (Nosaj Thing x Pretty Lights)
- 2016: "Only Yesterday"
- 2017: "Rainbows & Waterfalls"

=== Remixes ===
- 2010: "Chicago Bulls Theme" (Pretty Lights Remix)
- 2011: "Solar Sailer" (Pretty Lights Remix) from TRON Legacy: Reconfigured
- 2011: "Country Roads" (Pretty Lights Remix)
- 2011: "It's Tricky" (Pretty Lights Remix)
- 2012: "Wayfaring Stranger" (Pretty Lights Remix)
- 2012: "Halloween Funtime Remix"
- 2013: "Exodus" (Pretty Lights Remix)
- 2013: "I Put A Spell On You" (Pretty Lights Remix)
