= Starfall (film) =

- Russian: Звездопад
- Directed by: Igor Talankin
- Written by: Viktor Astafyev; Igor Talankin
- Starring: Alla Demidova; Pyotr Fyodorov; Darya Mikhaylova; Maksim Prizov; Nadezhda Bochkova
- Cinematography: Georgi Rerberg
- Edited by: Zoya Veryovkina
- Music by: Alfred Schnittke
- Release date: 1981
- Country: Soviet Union
- Language: Russian

Starfall (Russian: Звездопад) is a 1981 Soviet war romance film directed by Igor Talankin.

== Plot ==
The film tells about a man and a woman who met in a front-line city and fell in love. They wanted to get married, but the war and the mother of the main character interfered with them.

== Cast ==
- Alla Demidova
- Pyotr Fyodorov as Misha Yerofeyev
- Darya Mikhaylova as Lida
- Maksim Prizov as Mishka
- Nadezhda Bochkova
- Pyotr Yurchenkov
- Vera Glagoleva
- Olga Anokhina
- Aleksandr Bespaly
- Sergey Desnitsky
