= Hangout Music Festival line-ups =

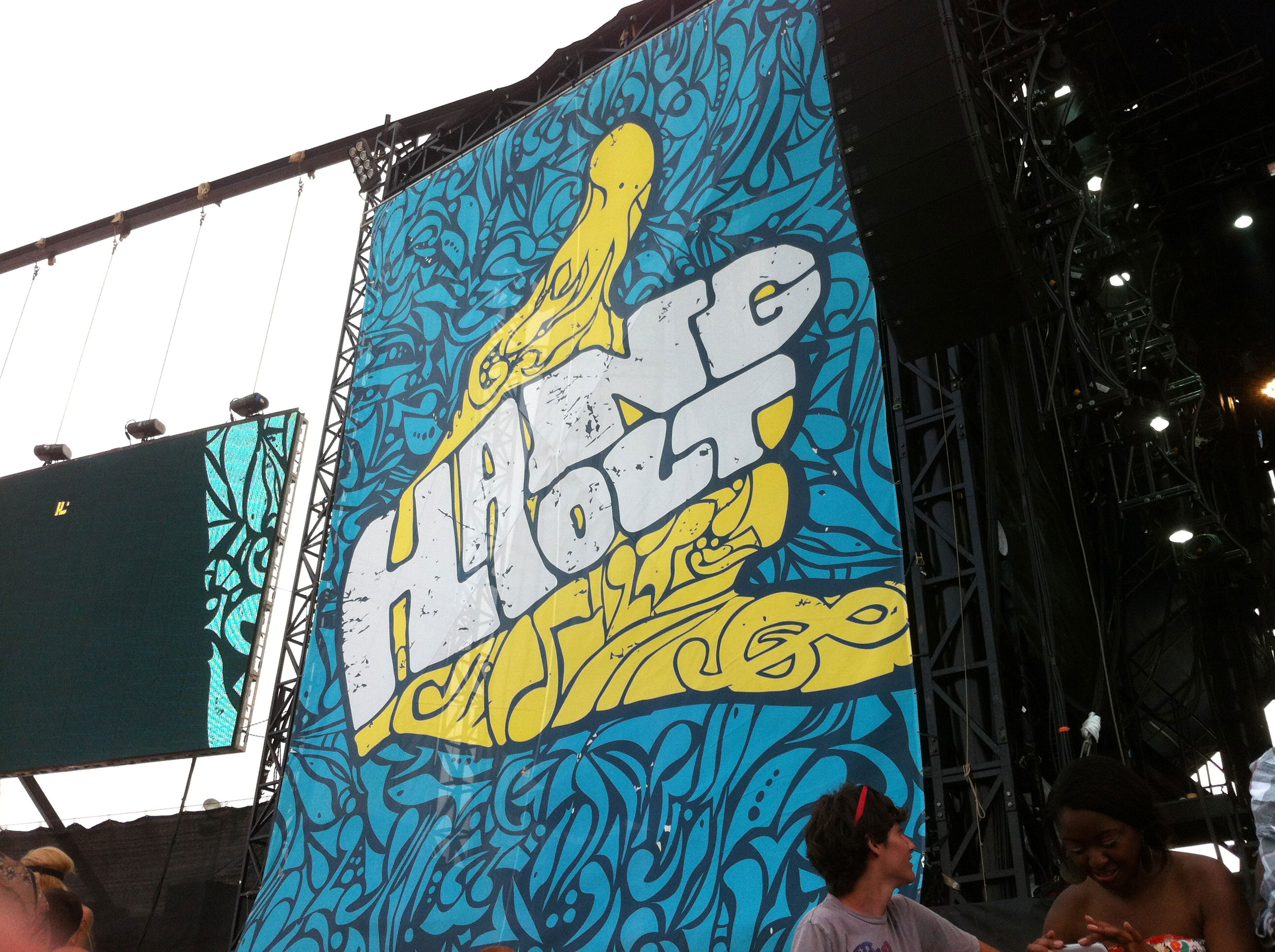
Hangout Music Festival 2013.

The Hangout Music Festival (commonly referred to as Hangout Fest or Hangout) is an annual three-day music festival held at the public beaches of Gulf Shores, Alabama. It was founded by A.J. Niland and Shaul Zislin in 2012, and is produced by Huka Entertainment. The event features many genres of music, including rock, indie, hip hop, and electronic dance music. It is the first major music festival held on the beach in the city.

== Line-ups ==
All information taken from various sources. Headline performers are listed in Boldface.

== 2010 ==
The inaugural Hangout Beach Festival was held on May 14–16, 2012. The headliners were Trey Anastasio Band, Zac Brown Band, and John Legend. Other notable performers included: The Roots, Ben Harper and Relentless7, The Black Crowes, Guster, Keller Williams, Alison Krauss and Union Station, Gov’t Mule, Ray Lamontagne, Robert Randolph and The Family Band, Michael Franti and Spearhead, Rodrigo Y Gabriela, Matisyahu, Grace Potter and the Nocturnals, North Mississippi Allstars Duo, Pnuma Trio ALO, Papa Mali, The Whigs, Ozomatli, OK Go, Black Joe Lewis and the Honeybears, Toubab Krewe, Needtobreathe, Jeff Austin & Friends, Moon Taxi, and Girl Talk.

== 2011 ==
The 2011 Hangout Music Festival took place on May 20–22, 2011. The festival added another stage and began booking larger headlining acts. Attendance had to be capped at 35,000 per day, an unprecedented number for the second year of a music festival in the region, due to safety concerns. The 2011 event was estimated to have generated approximately $30 million for the Gulf Shores area economy.

=== Thursday ===
Hangout Stage
- Dumpstaphunk
- Big Sam's Funky Nation
- Moon Taxi
- Andrew Duhon
- Kristy Lee and Romany Rye

=== Friday ===
Hangout Stage	Surf Style Stage	Boom Boom Room	Grooveshark Stage	Shaka Island
**Widespread Panic**; Warren Haynes Band; Umphrey's McGee; Kristy Lee	My Morning Jacket; Grace Potter and the Nocturnals; Brandi Carlile	Bassnectar; Beats Antique; Karl Denson's Tiny Universe	STS9; Soja; Easy Star All-Stars; Cas Haley	Railroad Earth; Greensky Bluegrass; Honey Island Swamp Band; Jambo; The Baby Grands; The Q Brothers

Hangout Late-Night Tent	Hangout Late-Night Stage (Note: This stage was located within The Hangout restaurant, rather than the Hangout Stage.)
Bassnectar with Beats Antique (DJ set)	Rich Aucoin Live in 3D! with Lynx.

=== Saturday ===
Hangout Stage	Surf Style Stage	Boom Boom Room	Grooveshark Stage	Shaka Island
**Foo Fighters**; The Avett Brothers; Cee Lo Green (scheduled, but no-show. Foo Fighters filled in with a covers set.); Slightly Stoopid; Mariachi El Bronx	The Flaming Lips; Primus; Minus the Bear; Medeski Martin & Wood	Pretty Lights; Big Gigantic; Xavier Rudd; Rich Aucoin	Motörhead; Khris Royal and Dark Matter; Dead Confederate; Civil Twilight; Lennon Bus	Rival Sons; Jon Black; The Verve Pipe; School of Rock; Peter D & Tor; The Baby Grands; Lunch Money; Jambo

Hangout Late-Night Tent	Hangout Late-Night Stage (Note: This stage was located within The Hangout restaurant, rather than the Hangout Stage.)
Pretty Lights with Big Gigantic	Tony Clifton & The Katrina Kiss-My-Ass Orchestra

=== Sunday ===
Hangout Stage	Surf Style Stage	Boom Boom Room	Grooveshark Stage	Shaka Island
**Paul Simon**; Michael Franti & Spearhead; Amos Lee; Keller Williams	The Black Keys; Ween; Matisyahu; Portugal. The Man	Girl Talk; Drive-By Truckers; Old Crow Medicine Show; Jonathan Tyler and the Northern Lights	Galactic; Trombone Shorty & Orleans Ave; JJ Grey and Mofro; Truth and Salvage Co.; Roman Street	Justin Townes Earle; A Thousand Horses; The Verve Pipe; Keller Williams; Lunch Money; Peter D & Tor; The Q Brothers; Michael Franti; School of Rock; DJ Jimmy Boom

== 2012 ==
The 2012 festival took place May 18–20, 2012. Advance tickets for the 2012 event, which continued to be capped at 35,000 attendees per day, sold out within one hour. General admission tickets sold out on February 21, 2012, almost three months prior to the event.

=== Thursday ===
Xbox Stage	BP Kids Stage
Big Gigantic; BoomBox; Perpetual Grooves; Nobody Beats the Drum; The Revivalists	Zoogma; Preservation Hall Jazz Band; Dirty Dozen Brass Band; Delta Rae; The Kingston Springs; Tauk

=== Friday ===
Hangout Stage	Chevrolet Stage	Xbox Stage	"Letting Go" Stage	BP Kids Stage
**Jack White**; The Avett Brothers; Chris Cornell; Coheed & Cambria; Rebelution	Wilco; M. Ward; Alabama Shakes; Sleeper Agent	STS9; Paul Oakenfold; Yelawolf; Rich Aucoin; Hey Rosetta!	Umphrey's McGee; Dawes; Allen Stone; Switchfoot	Gravity A; Zoogma; ZNI; The School of Rock; Big Bang Boom Special Guest; Peter Distefano & Tor; John Yost's Rhythm Revolution; The Q Brothers; DJ Jimmy Boom Boom

=== Saturday ===
Hangout Stage	Chevrolet Stage	Xbox Stage	"Letting Go" Stage	BP Kids Stage
**Red Hot Chili Peppers**; Dispatch; Gary Clark, Jr.; Julian Marley & the Uprising; Givers	The String Cheese Incident (Note: The String Cheese Incident performed two sets.); Gogol Bordello; Randy Newman; Tribal Seeds	Shpongle; Kaskade; Skrillex; Mac Miller; Archnemesis	Flogging Molly; Dr. Dog; Heartless Bastards; The Devil Makes Three; Future Birds	Fort Atlantic; Machines Are People Too; Johnnie Leeds & the Nightlights; Special Guest; The School of Rock; Peter Distefano & Tor; Jim Cosgrove; Big Bang Boom; DJ Jimmy Boom Boom

=== Sunday ===
Hangout Stage	Chevrolet Stage	Xbox Stage	"Letting Go" Stage	BP Kids Stage
**Dave Matthews Band**; Edward Sharpe & the Magnetic Zeros; Michael Franti & Spearhead; The Greyboy Allstars	The Flaming Lips performing The Dark Side of the Moon; Steve Winwood; Mavis Staples; The Lumineers	Zeds Dead; Paper Diamond; Big Freedia & the Divas; Cherub	G. Love & Special Sauce; Cage the Elephant; Young the Giant; Delta Spirit; Jamie Bergeron & the Kickin' Cajuns	Space Capone; Flannel Church; Jim Cosgrove; Special Guest; The Q Brothers; Peter Distefano & Tor; Johnnie Leeds & the Nightlights; The School of Rock; DJ Jimmy Boom Boom

== 2013 ==
The 2013 festival took place May 17–19, 2013. The 2013 festival sold out as well, but failed to meet the previous year's "rapid sellout" of general admission tickets.

=== Thursday ===
Letting Go Stage	Boom Boom Tent
Umphrey's McGee; Railroad Earth; Drew Holcomb and the Neighbors; Hayes Carll; Johnnyswim; Reptar; St. Paul and The Broken Bones	Benny Benassi; Dillon Francis; Lotus; Conspirator; Quixotic; Wick-it the Instigator; Future Rock

=== Friday ===
Hangout Stage	Chevrolet Stage	Letting Go Stage	BMI Stage	Boom Boom Tent
**Kings of Leon**; Passion Pit; Jim James; The Breeders; Twin Sister	The Shins; Grizzly Bear; Toots and the Maytals; Lissie	Ryan Bingham; Big Gigantic; The Sheepdogs; Twenty One Pilots	Anders Osbourne; The Weeks; Luella and the Sun; Colin Lake	Macklemore & Ryan Lewis; Afrojack; Ra Ra Riot; Lance Herbstrong

=== Saturday ===
Hangout Stage	Chevrolet Stage	Letting Go Stage	BMI Stage	Boom Boom Tent
**Tom Petty & the Heartbreakers**; The Black Crowes; Gov’t Mule; Shovels & Rope; Delta Rae	Bassnectar; The Roots; Dirty Projectors; Nick Bluhm and the Gramblers	Slightly Stoopid; Holy Ghost!; The Bright Light Social Hour; The Werks	The Tontons; Kingston Springs; The Mowgli's; Wild Cub	Kendrick Lamar; Wolfgang Gartner; Public Enemy; Brassft Punk

=== Sunday ===
Hangout Stage	Chevrolet Stage	Letting Go Stage	BMI Stage	Boom Boom Tent
**Stevie Wonder**; Yeah Yeah Yeahs; Ellie Goulding; Grouplove	Trey Anastasio Band; Imagine Dragons; Galactic; Best Coast	Bloc Party; moe.; Moon Taxi; The Revivalists	Jason Isbell & the 400 Unit; Space Capone; Chancellor Warhol; The Wild Feathers	Steve Aoki; Porter Robinson; Baauer; Zion I

== 2014 ==
The 2014 festival took place May 16–18, 2014. 40,000 tickets were sold, up from the previous audience cap of 35,000. The 2014 festival was the first to allow access to the Gulf of Mexico, which was previously restricted to security and artists.

=== Thursday ===
Boom Boom Tent	Palladia Stage	Red Bull Sound Select Stage
Girl Talk; Danny Brown; Bonobo	Wolfmother; Iron & Wine; Bleachers; Go Down Moses	Dumpstaphunk; Bombay Bicycle Club; Jamestown Revival; Magic Man

=== Friday ===
Hangout Stage	Chevrolet Stage	Boom Boom Tent	Palladia Stage	Red Bull Sound Select Stage	BMI Stage
**The Black Keys**; Gary Clark Jr.; Dawes; Balkan Beat Box; Ozomatli	Queens of the Stone Age; Wiz Khalifa; Ingrid Michaelson; Allen Stone	STS9; Childish Gambino; Claude VonStroke; RAC; Herobust	Conor Oberst; The 1975; Valerie June; Black Lips	Gemini Club; Bad Suns; John and Jacob; Los Colognes	Wild Cub; Underhill Family Orchestra; Bronze Radio Return; Empires

=== Saturday ===
Hangout Stage	Chevrolet Stage	Boom Boom Tent	Palladia Stage	Red Bull Sound Select Stage	BMI Stage
**The Killers**; Modest Mouse; Amos Lee; Needtobreathe; RDGLDGRN	The Flaming Lips; Matt & Kim; Tegan and Sara; Little Green Cars	Pretty Lights; The Bloody Beetroots; Tommy Trash; Robert DeLong; Daedelus	Fitz and the Tantrums; Trombone Shorty & Orleans Avenue; Animal Liberation Orchestra; Diarrhea Planet	Moon Taxi (Note: This spot was originally for Chance the Rapper, who grew ill at the last minute.); Moon Taxi (as People of the Sun); The Electric Sons; The Black Cadillacs	Wild Belle; The Lonely Biscuits; Shakey Graves; Desert Noises

=== Sunday ===
Hangout Stage	Chevrolet Stage	Boom Boom Tent	Palladia Stage	Red Bull Sound Select Stage	BMI Stage
**OutKast**; The Avett Brothers; Capital Cities; Soja; Josh Farrow	Jack Johnson; Portugal. The Man; Bastille; Blackberry Smoke	Zedd; Boys Noize; Mimosa; Caked Up	Andrew W.K.; Los Lobos; Reignwolf; Tom Odell	Mystery Skulls; The Tontons; LE1F; Wrestlers (Bagheera)	St. Paul and The Broken Bones; The Wans; Ethan Tucker; Dugas

== 2015 ==
The 2015 edition took place May 15–17, 2015.

=== Friday ===
Hangout Stage	Surf Stage	Boom Boom Tent	Palladia Stage	Salt Life Stage	BMI Stage	Malibu Beach House
**Foo Fighters**; Spoon; Jenny Lewis; Trampled by Turtles; Jamell Richardson	Paramore; Umphrey's McGee; Dirty Heads; Charles Bradley and His Extraordinaires	**Jack Ü**; Gramatik; Lupe Fiasco; Five Knives; SNBRN	Galactic with Macy Gray; Cold War Kids; Zella Day; Joywave	J Roddy Walston and the Business; Roadkill Ghost Choir; DJ Windows 98; Deap Vally	Grizfolk; Houndmouth; Halsey; Steelism	jackLNDN; Autograf; Sean Glass; Mija; SNBRN; Gibbz; Spice J

=== Saturday ===
Hangout Stage	Surf Stage	Boom Boom Tent	Palladia Stage	Salt Life Stage	BMI Stage	Malibu Beach House
**Zac Brown Band**; Drive-By Truckers; Future Islands; Sylvan Esso; Xavier Rudd & the United Nations	Skrillex; Damian "Jr. Gong" Marley; The Mowgli's; Toro y Moi	Major Lazer; Adventure Club; Talib Kweli; Beats Antique; Skylar Spence	Father John Misty; Odesza; JEFF the Brotherhood; Knox Hamilton	San Fermin; Strand of Oaks; Young Fathers; Elliot Root	Preservation Hall Jazz Band; The Districts; Elle King; The Suffers	Autograf; Mija; Jillionaire; jackLNDN; Sean Glass; Marley Carroll; Spice J

=== Sunday ===
Hangout Stage	Surf Stage	Boom Boom Tent	Palladia Stage	Salt Life Stage	BMI Stage	Malibu Beach House
**Beck**; Foster the People; Vance Joy; Frank Turner & the Sleeping Souls; Iration	My Morning Jacket; TV on the Radio; Tove Lo; MisterWives	Krewella; GRiZ; Robert DeLong; Goldroom	Phantogram; Lake Street Dive; St. Lucia; Rubblebucket	Mary Lambert; Kopecky; Preservation Hall Jazz Band; Floating Action	The Lone Bellow; Colony House; Natural Child; Firekid	Mija; jackLNDN; Autograf; Sean Glass; Spice J; Dino Brawl

== 2016 ==
The 2016 edition took place May 19–17, 2016.

=== Thursday ===
Boom Boom Tent	AXS.TV Stage	Mermaid Stage
Matt & Kim; Baauer; Moon Taxi as People of the Sun	Grouplove; Lil Dicky	Big Freedia; Seratones; Samo Sound Boy

=== Friday ===
Hangout Stage	Surf Stage	Boom Boom Tent	AXS.TV Stage	BMI Stage	Mermaid Stage	Malibu Beach House
**The Weeknd**; Walk the Moon; Moon Taxi; Silversun Pickups	**Alabama Shakes**; Jason Isbell; Big Grams; Pepper	The Chainsmokers; Snails; Alison Wonderland; Hippie Sabotage; Prince Fox	Alessia Cara; The Struts; Børns; Phases	The Revivalists; Daya; Bully; Roots of a Rebellion	Vince Staples; GIVERS; Brett Dennen; Meg Mac	Jack Novak; Jerry Folk; Speaker of the House; Spice J

=== Saturday ===
Hangout Stage	Surf Stage	Boom Boom Tent	AXS.TV Stage	BMI Stage	Mermaid Stage	Malibu Beach House
Calvin Harris; Panic! at the Disco; Portugal. The Man; X Ambassadors; Stick Figure	Cage the Elephant; The Neighbourhood; Bear Hands; Magic Man	Foals; Miike Snow; 3lau; Tourist; Jai Wolf	Leon Bridges; Atlas Genius; Kurt Vile & the Violators; Kaleo	The Whigs; Zoogma; Hardy & the Hardknocks; Koa	Nahko and Medicine for the People; The Griswolds; Lizzo; The Record Company	Hippie Sabotage; Jack Novak; Speaker of the House; Jerry Folk

=== Sunday ===
Hangout Stage	Surf Stage	Boom Boom Tent	AXS.TV Stage	BMI Stage	Mermaid Stage	Malibu Beach House
**Florence and the Machine**; Lenny Kravitz; Fetty Wap; Coleman Hell	Ellie Goulding; Haim; Run the Jewels; The Wailers Band	Flume; Grimes; Bro Safari; Lost Kings	Courtney Barnett; Mayer Hawthorne; Health; Bass Drum of Death	Muddy Magnolias; Powers; Pell; Strangers You Know	Thomas Jack; Raury; Judah & the Lion; Coasts	Speaker of the House; Jack Novak; Jerry Folk; Spice J

== 2017 ==
The 2017 edition was held on May 18–21, 2017.

=== Thursday ===
Boom Boom Tent	Mermaid Stage
Migos; Cherub; Tchami	DJ Jazzy Jeff; Shaun Frank; Nawas

=== Friday ===
Hangout Stage	Surf Stage	Boom Boom Tent	Fitz's Stage	Mermaid Stage	BMI Stage	Malibu Beach House
**Phoenix**; MGMT; Charli XCX; Joseph	Weezer; Mac DeMarco; The Strumbellas; The Suffers	Dillon Francis; A$AP Ferg; Cash Cash; Kungs; Elephante	Russ; Andrew McMahon in the Wilderness; Bishop Briggs; Missio; 888	PVRIS; Coin; White Reaper; Jimmy Lumpkin & the Revival	Barns Courtney; Foreign Air; The Heydaze; Rassh	Kap Slap; Le Youth; Nora En Pure; DJ Hashim

=== Saturday ===
Hangout Stage	Surf Stage	Boom Boom Tent	Fitz's Stage	Mermaid Stage	BMI Stage	Malibu Beach House
**Twenty One Pilots**; Band of Horses; Rüfüs Du Sol; Mutemath	Major Lazer; Tory Lanez; Local Natives; MAGIC!	Sigur Rós; Cheat Codes; Snakehips; Louis the Child; Phantoms	The Head and the Heart; Lewis Del Mar; Rainbow Kitten Surprise; Mondo Cozmo	LP; Tkay Maidza; Joshua James	Cobi; Susto; A R I Z O N A; Fletcher	Nora En Pure; Kap Slap; Jillionaire; Le Youth

=== Sunday ===
Hangout Stage	Surf Stage	Boom Boom Tent	Fitz's Stage	Mermaid Stage	BMI Stage	Malibu Beach House
**Mumford & Sons**; Young the Giant; Lukas Graham; Shaggy	**Chance the Rapper**; DJ Snake; Lil Yachty; Hurray for the Riff Raff	Marshmello; Nghtmre; Matoma; Gryffin; Cvbz	Franz Ferdinand; Bob Moses; LANY; Susto	Warpaint; Towkio; Strand of Oaks; Pardison Fontaine	Lawrence; Grace Mitchell; The Worn Flints; The New Respects	Le Youth; Nora En Pure; Kap Slap

== 2018 ==
The 2018 edition was held on May 18–20, 2018.

=== Friday ===
- **The Killers**
- Zedd
- Portugal. The Man
- Galantis
- Cold War Kids
- Blackbear
- Oh Wonder
- Tash Sultana
- Lauv
- Lost Kings
- Anderson East
- Dej Loaf
- Pussy Riot
- Nothing But Thieves
- Banners
- Ron Gallo
- The Green
- The Glorious Sons
- Caroline Rose
- Bones

=== Saturday ===
- **The Chainsmokers**
- Halsey
- Logic
- Anderson .Paak & the Free Nationals
- St. Vincent
- Grouplove
- Bleachers
- Manchester Orchestra
- Tank and the Bangas
- Cashmere Cat
- Bahamas
- Noname
- San Holo
- Son Little
- Kasbo
- Skip Marley
- Goldfish
- R.LUM.R
- Mikky Ekko

=== Sunday ===
- **Kendrick Lamar**
- SZA
- Foster the People
- Awolnation
- Slightly Stoopid
- Lil Pump
- The Struts
- Getter
- NF
- Greta Van Fleet
- Whethan
- Alice Merton
- MAX
- AJR
- Poolside
- Hippo Campus
- Melvv
- Alex Lahey
- Welshly Arms
- Mansionair
- Sunflower Bean
- Hotel Garuda

== 2019 ==
The 2019 edition was held on May 16–19, 2019.

=== Thursday ===
Boom Boom Tent	Mermaid Stage

=== Friday ===
Hangout Stage	Pandora Surf Stage	Boom Boom Tent	BMI Mermaid Stage	Alabama NewsCenter Sunset Stage	Monster Beach Club	Malibu Beach House
**Travis Scott**; The 1975; Bishop Briggs; Flora Cash	**Vampire Weekend**; Judah & the Lion; Superorganism; Pale Waves	Diplo; Hippie Sabotage; Mura Masa; Loud Luxury; Bryce Vine; Medasin	The Interrupters; Chika; Shaed; Abhi the Nomad; Powers Pleasant	Hirie; RDGLDGRN; New Kingston; Jesse Royal	Black Caviar; SNBRN; Cray; The Him	Dr. Fresch; Justin Jay; Hugel; Moon Boots

=== Saturday ===
Hangout Stage	Pandora Surf Stage	Boom Boom Tent	BMI Mermaid Stage	Alabama NewsCenter Sunset Stage	Monster Beach Club	Malibu Beach House
**Khalid**; Walk the Moon; Sir Sly; Sofi Tukker; Lovelytheband	**Kygo**; Jimmy Eat World; A R I Z O N A; Taylor Bennett; Castlecomer	Alison Wonderland; MadeinTYO; Jonas Blue; Bazzi; Ravyn Lenae; Justin Caruso	Shame; Slenderbodies; Jade Bird; Morgxn; Easy Life	Jesse Royal; New Kingston; Hirie; RDGLDGRN	Cray; Black Caviar; The Him; Rachel Torro	Justin Jay; Hugel; Moon Boots; Dr. Fresch

=== Sunday ===
Hangout Stage	Pandora Surf Stage	Boom Boom Tent	BMI Mermaid Stage	Alabama NewsCenter Sunset Stage	Monster Beach Club	Malibu Beach House
**The Lumineers**; Hozier; GRiZ; Jungle; Quinn XCII; Elley Duhé	**Cardi B**; Bebe Rexha; King Princess; Two Feet; Grandson	Ella Mai; Gorgon City; Lauren Daigle; Elohim; Two Friends; Graves	Buddy; Spencer Ludwig; Hembree; Dreamer Boy	New Kingston; Hirie; Jesse Royal; The Red Clay Strays	The Him; Black Caviar; Cray; Rachel Torro	Moon Boots; Dr. Fresch; Hugel; Justin Jay; Purdy

== 2022 ==
The 2022 edition was held on May 20 to 22.

=== Friday ===
Hangout Stage	Surf Stage	Boom Stage	BMI Mermaid Stage	Monster Beach Club	Malibu Beach House
**Post Malone**; **Zedd**; **Maren Morris**; Surfaces; Remi Wolf; Nightly	**Fall Out Boy**; **Kane Brown**; Oliver Tree; Dayglow; Zach Hood	San Holo; T-Pain; Emo Nite; Tyla Yaweh; Lucii; Gabriel Black	Koffee; Briston Maroney; Audrey Nuna; Bren Joy	LP Giobbi; JVNA; NOTD; Luttrell; Grant Fisher	NOTD; Luttrell; JVNA; Lady Lavender

=== Saturday ===
Hangout Stage	Surf Stage	Boom Stage	BMI Mermaid Stage	Monster Beach Club	Malibu Beach House
**Halsey**; **Illenium**; **Leon Bridges**; Still Woozy; Role Model; Leah Kate	**Doja Cat**; The Band Camino; Chelsea Cutler; Moon Taxi; Neal Francis	Madeon; Lil Yachty; Flo Milli; Surf Mesa; Bankrol Hayden; 347aidan; The Blssm	Beabadoobee; Breland; Renforshort; Hastings	SNBRN; Disco Lines; SNBRN; Madds; Grant Fisher	Ship Wrek; Madds; Disco Lines; Concourse

=== Sunday ===
Hangout Stage	Surf Stage	Boom Stage	BMI Mermaid Stage	Monster Beach Club	Malibu Beach House
**Tame Impala**; **Jack Harlow**; **Louis the Child**; The Head and the Heart; The Brook & the Bluff; Flipturn	**Megan Thee Stallion**; **Phoebe Bridgers**; Sublime with Rome; KennyHoopla; Sueco	Slander; DIESEL; Fletcher; Sidepiece; Yung Bae; Ericdoa; Montell2099	Paul Cauthen; Blu DeTiger; Joy Oladokun; Tre' Amani	Vnssa; Wreckno; Uniiqu3; Hugel; Petey Martin	GG Magree; Hugel; Petey Martin

== 2023 ==
The 2023 edition was held on May 19 to 21. It was headlined by Red Hot Chili Peppers, SZA, Calvin Harris, Paramore, Lil Nas X, Flume, Skrillex, and The Kid Laroi.

=== Friday ===
Hangout Stage	Shein Surf Stage	Boom Stage	Mermaid Stage	Monster Beach Club	Malibu Beach House
**Red Hot Chili Peppers**; Rainbow Kitten Surprise; Russ; Tove Lo; Meet Me at the Altar	**Lil Nas X**; Gryffin; mike.; Stephen Sanchez; The Vegabonds	Rezz; GloRilla; Two Feet; Night Tales; A Hundred Drums	Thundercat; Jordana; Caye	Night Tales; Moore Kismet; Aluna; Zewmøb	Aluna; A Hundred Drums; Harleigh Colt; Zewmøb

=== Saturday ===
Hangout Stage	Shein Surf Stage	Boom Stage	Mermaid Stage	Monster Beach Club	Malibu Beach House
**SZA**; **Flume**; AJR; Coin; Kidd G	**Paramore**; Sabrina Carpenter; Big Wild; Highly Suspect; Flipturn	Ferg; John Summit; The Maine; Dr. Fresch; Wenzday	Mariah the Scientist; Charlotte Sands; Daniel Nunnelee	Dr. Fresch; Ranger Trucco; Nostalgix; Meachie	Nostalgix; Deeper Purpose; Ranger Trucco; Meachie

=== Sunday ===
Hangout Stage	Shein Surf Stage	Boom Stage	Mermaid Stage	Monster Beach Club	Malibu Beach House
**Calvin Harris**; **The Kid Laroi**; The Backseat Lovers; Yung Gravy; Beach Weather	**Skrillex**; Ashnikko; Noah Kahan; Jessie Murph; The 502s	Kevin Gates; Mayday Parade; Said the Sky; Hippie Sabotage; Sfam	Priscilla Block; Gashi; Sam Fischer	Elohim; It's Murph; Honeyluv; Grant Fisher	Honeyluv; Rossy; It's Murph; Grant Fisher

== 2024 ==
The 2024 edition was held on May 17 to 19. It was headlined by Zach Bryan, Lana Del Rey, and Odesza.

=== Friday ===
Hangout Stage	Shoreline Stage	Mermaid Stage	Monster Beach Club	Boom on the Beach
**Lana Del Rey**; Dominic Fike; A Day to Remember; David Kushner; The Stews	NLE Choppa; Del Water Gap; The Beaches; Brenn!	Matt Maeson; G Flip; Laci Kaye Booth; Linka Moja	Eliza Rose; LF System; Coco & Breezy; Madds	The Chainsmokers; TroyBoi; Daily Bread; Bunt

=== Saturday ===
Hangout Stage	Shoreline Stage	Mermaid Stage	Monster Beach Club	Boom on the Beach
**Odesza**; Cage the Elephant; Jessie Murph; Chappell Roan; Knox	Koe Wetzel; Qveen Herby; Dylan Gossett; Dasha	Flyana Boss; Alana Springsteen; The Taylor Party; Willow Avalon	Le Youth; Vnssa B2B Nala; Brandi Cyrus; Sommer Ray; Darius	Alison Wonderland; Sexyy Red; Disco Lines; Westend

=== Sunday ===
Hangout Stage	Shoreline Stage	Mermaid Stage	Monster Beach Club	Boom on the Beach
**Zach Bryan**; Reneé Rapp; Nelly; All Time Low; Little Stranger	Doechii; Megan Moroney; Dexter and the Moonrocks; Hemlocke Springs	Wyatt Flores; Paul Russell; Tanner Adell; Jaime Wyatt	Chromeo; Austin Millz; Inji; ABSNTH	Subtronics; Dom Dolla; Kasbo; Odd Mob × Omnom Hyperbeam
