= Hangout Music Festival =

Music festival

Coordinates: 30°14′54″N 87°41′22″W

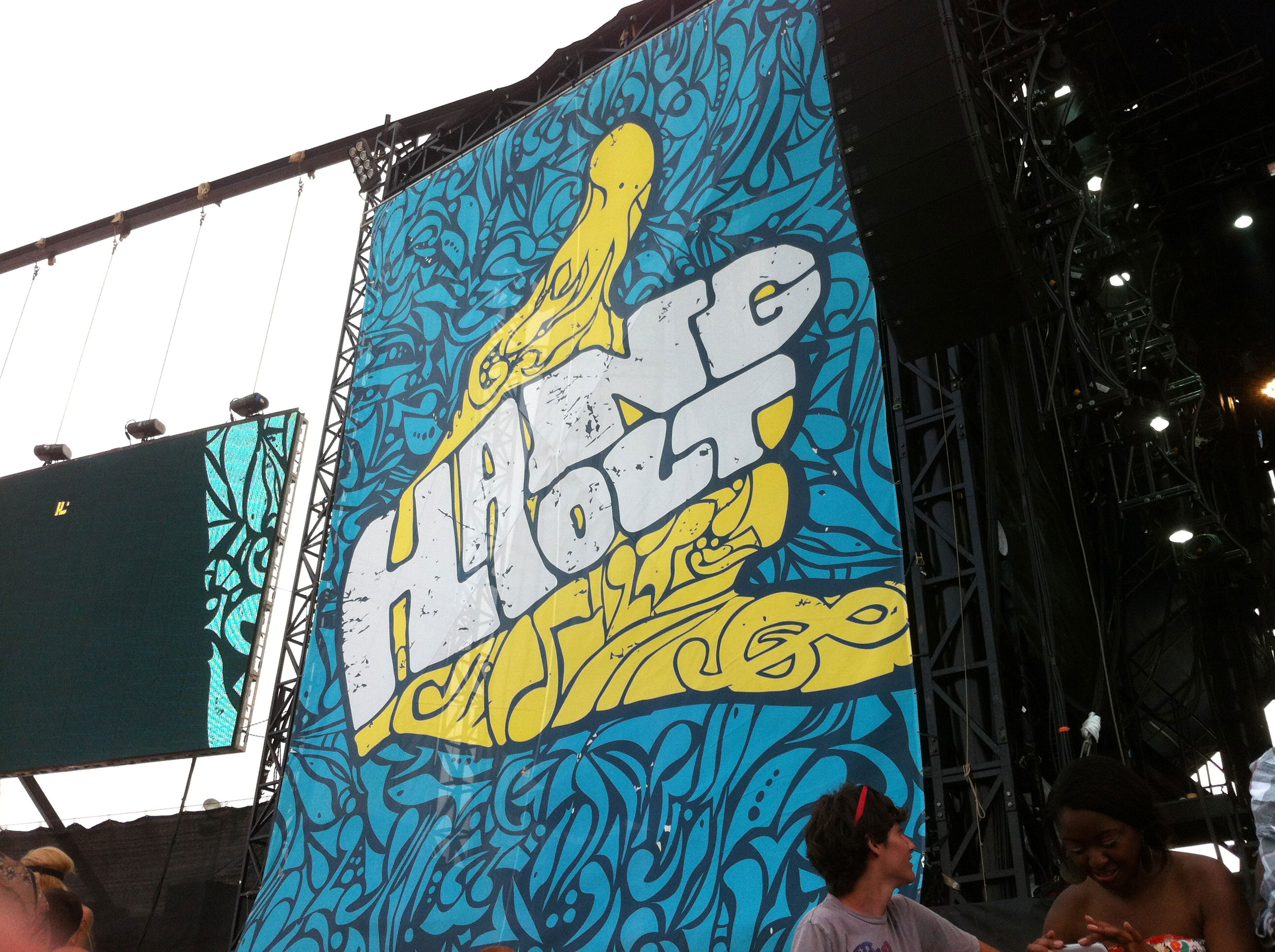
- 2013 Hangout Music Festival
- Genre: Rock, alternative, electronic dance music, indie, hip hop, jam bands, reggae
- Locations: 101 East Beach Boulevard; Gulf Shores, Alabama, USA
- Years active: 2010–present (shows cancelled in 2020 and 2021)
- Website: website

The Hangout Music Festival (commonly referred to as Hangout Fest or Hangout) is an annual three-day music festival held on the white sand beaches of Gulf Shores, Alabama. The main stages are the Hangout Stage and the Surf Stage (located on opposite ends of the beach), as well as the Boom Boom Tent and more. The festival generally takes place on the third weekend in May. It is the first major music festival held on the beach in the city.

Notable acts that have performed at Hangout Fest include Red Hot Chili Peppers, Lana Del Rey, Stevie Wonder, Paul Simon, Tom Petty & The Heartbreakers, Foo Fighters, OutKast, Mumford & Sons, The Weeknd, The Killers, Jack White, Dave Matthews Band, Twenty One Pilots, Kings of Leon, Queens of the Stone Age, Florence and the Machine, The Black Keys, Slightly Stoopid, Primus, Motörhead, Widespread Panic, Paramore, Ellie Goulding, The Avett Brothers, Chance the Rapper, The Chainsmokers, Halsey, Kendrick Lamar, Travis Scott, Khalid and Cardi B. Acts such as the Trey Anastasio Band, The Flaming Lips, Moon Taxi, and Bassnectar have performed several times at the festival.

In addition to music, the festival provides a full size roller rink, beach volleyball, a main stage in ground pool, hammocks, food, and DJs.

== History ==
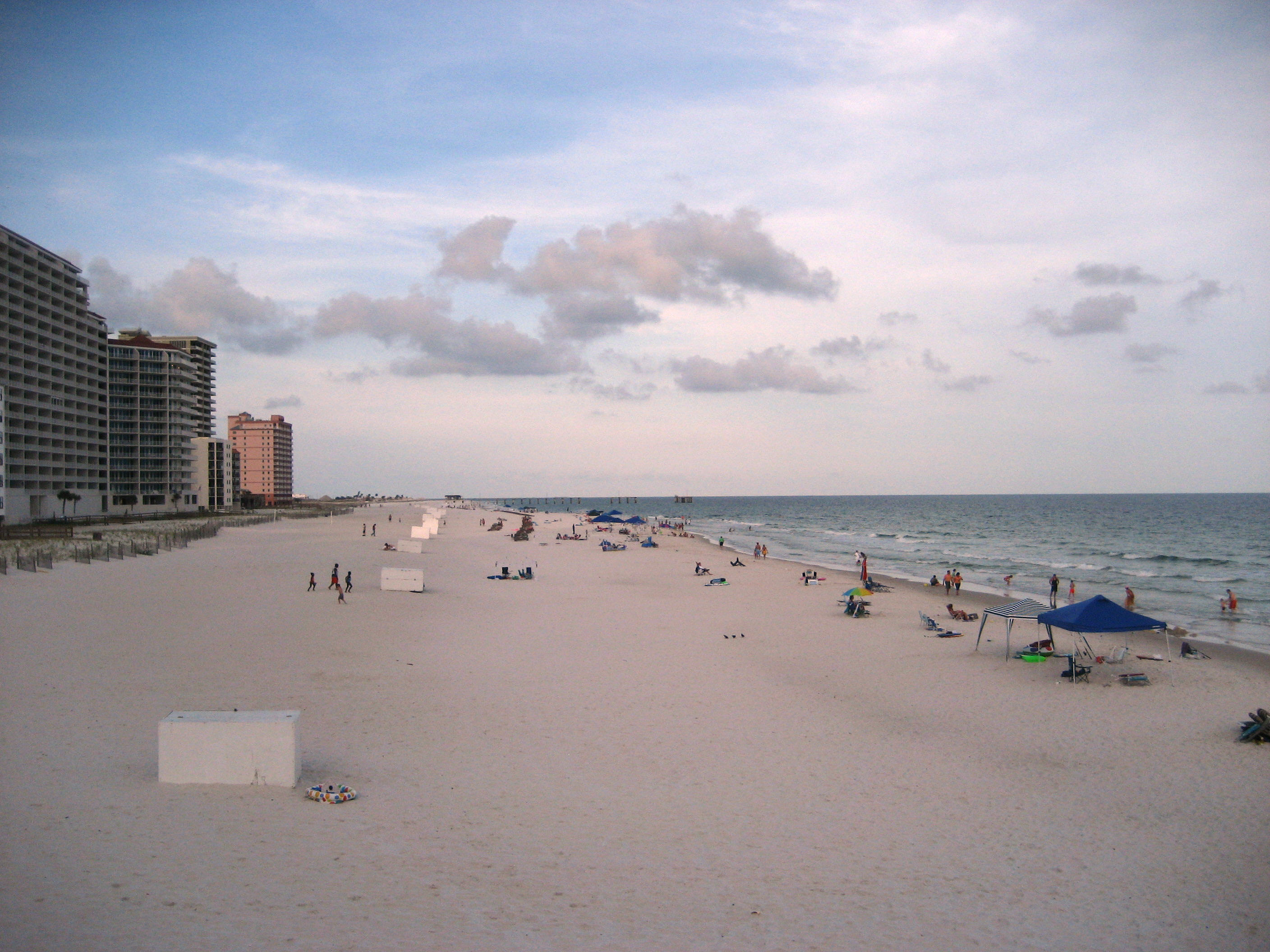
The beaches of Gulf Shores, Alabama in 2007.

Hangout Music Festival was founded in November 2009 by A.J. Niland, Shaul Zislin, and Lilly Zislin, who is the creative director of the festival. The Zislins are the proprietors of "The Hangout", the festival's namesake restaurant. The festival received approval from the Gulf Shores city council in December 2009, as well as a permit for acts to perform an hour later than would normally be allowed under city noise laws.

General information that the public should be aware of when purchasing tickets include: all ages are welcome, but ages 17 and under must be accompanied by a ticket holding adult over the age of 21, children ages five and under receive free admission if they are accompanied by a ticket holding parent or guardian, the festival will take place rain or shine, and the lineup of artists and schedule of the festival is subject to change. In regard to the free admission for five and younger, there is a maximum limit of two children per each ticket holding parent or guardian. A legitimate wristband is also required to enter the festival. Once purchased, the ticket buyer should receive their wristband at some point in the month of April.

A list of prohibited items, as well as frequently asked questions can be found on the official Hangout Music Festival website. This includes information concerning transportation, shelter, medical aid, payments and transactions, and accessibility.

Shortly before the festival's opening, the Gulf Coast was hit by the Deepwater Horizon oil spill, which impacted its attendance and general public perception of the area. The festival was attended by 13,000–15,000 people per day in 2010.

Attendance in 2011 had to be capped at 35,000 per day, an unprecedented number for the second year of a music festival in the region, due to safety concerns. The 2011 event was estimated to have generated approximately $30 million for the Gulf Shores area economy. Advance tickets for the 2012 event, which continues to be capped at 35,000 attendees per day, sold out within one hour. General admission tickets sold out on February 21, 2012, almost three months prior to the event.

The 2013 festival sold out as well, but failed to meet the previous year's "rapid sellout" of general admission tickets. 40,000 tickets were sold in 2014, up from the previous audience cap of 35,000. In 2014, the festival first allowed access to the Gulf of Mexico, which was previously restricted to security and artists.

In 2015, Goldenvoice, the company behind Coachella Valley Music and Arts Festival, entered into a joint venture to produce Hangout Fest.

In 2020 the Festival was scheduled for May 14–16, 2021, and had its fastest sellout of all time. However, Hangout received notice from the City of Gulf Shores in March 2020 that the festival could not take place due to the coronavirus pandemic. Full refunds and transfer options were made available to those who may not have the opportunity to attend the rescheduled event.

== Economic impact ==
The city receives over US$700,000 in direct tax revenue each year plus a franchise fee of one percent of gross festival ticket revenue beginning with the 2017 festival, and increasing to three percent in 2019. In 2014, the festival signed a 10-year agreement with the city to continue through at least 2020.

A study conducted in 2013 by M. Keivan Deravi, a professor of economics at Auburn University, shows that the festival infuses over $31 million into the local economy and reaches an estimated 564 million through social media, TV outlets and live-streaming video of the event. The 2014 festival was projected to have a $47.5 million impact. Additionally, the festival supports roughly 600 jobs.

== Recognition ==
The festival has been nominated multiple times for "Festival of the Year" at the concert industry's Pollstar Awards and won the award in 2012. The festival has been nominated multiple times for "Festival of the Year" at the IEBA awards.

== Performers ==
=== 2010 ===
The inaugural Hangout Beach Festival was held on May 14–16, 2010. The headliners were Trey Anastasio Band, Zac Brown Band, and John Legend. Other notable performers included: The Roots, Ben Harper and Relentless7, The Black Crowes, Guster, Keller Williams, Alison Krauss and Union Station, Gov’t Mule, Ray Lamontagne, Robert Randolph and The Family Band, Michael Franti and Spearhead, Rodrigo Y Gabriela, Matisyahu, Grace Potter and the Nocturnals, North Mississippi Allstars Duo, Pnuma Trio ALO, Papa Mali, The Whigs, Ozomatli, OK Go, Black Joe Lewis and the Honeybears, Toubab Krewe, Needtobreathe, Jeff Austin & Friends, Moon Taxi, and Girl Talk.

=== 2011 ===
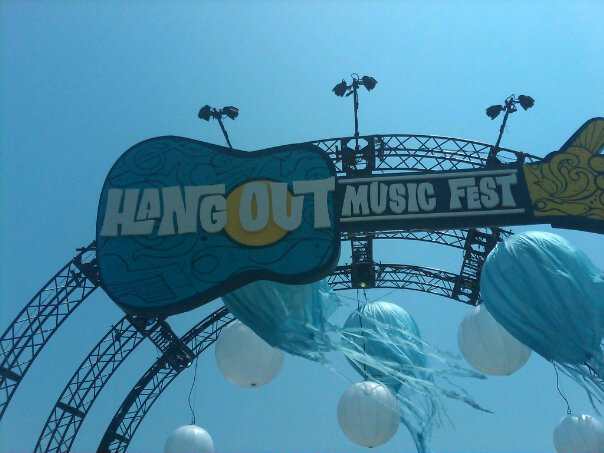
Festival entrance in 2011.

The 2011 festival took place on May 20–22, 2011. The headliners were Foo Fighters, Paul Simon, and Widespread Panic. Other notable performers included: The Black Keys, The Flaming Lips, My Morning Jacket, STS9, Bassnectar, Primus, Ween, Pretty Lights, Slightly Stoopid, Umphrey's McGee, The Avett Brothers, Big Gigantic, Motörhead, Cee-Lo Green, Girl Talk, Matisyahu, Warren Haynes Band, Grace Potter and the Nocturnals, Drive-By Truckers, Beats Antique, Easy Star All-Stars, Amos Lee, JJ Grey & MOFRO, Michael Franti and Spearhead, Old Crow Medicine Show, Keller Williams, Galactic, Trombone Shorty & Orleans Avenue, Portugal. The Man, Medeski, Martin and Wood, Xavier Rudd, Minus the Bear, Dead Confederate, Mariachi El Bronx, Civil Twilight, Rival Sons, Brandi Carlile, Karl Denson's Tiny Universe, SOJA, Railroad Earth, Greensky Bluegrass, Kristy Lee, Cas Haley, Jonathan Tyler and the Northern Lights, and Truth & Salvage Co.

=== 2012 ===
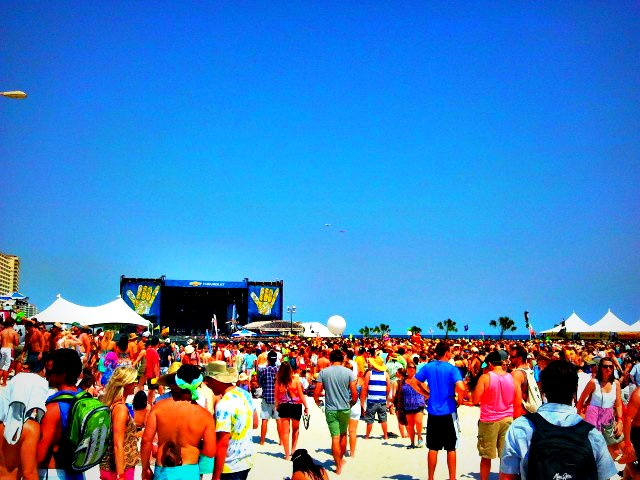
Large crowd around the Chevrolet Stage during Hangout Music Fest 2012.

The 2012 festival took place May 18–20, 2012. The headliners were Jack White, Red Hot Chili Peppers, and Dave Matthews Band. Other notable performers included: Alabama Shakes, Skrillex, The String Cheese Incident, Wilco, Paul Oakenfold, Archnemesis, The Flaming Lips, Chris Cornell, STS9, Dispatch, Gogol Bordello, Michael Franti and Spearhead, Mac Miller, Flogging Molly, Coheed and Cambria, G. Love and Special Sauce, Randy Newman, Young The Giant, Dr. Dog, Cage The Elephant, M. Ward, Yelawolf, Switchfoot, Julian Marley, Zeds Dead, Mavis Staples, Shpongle, Gary Clark Jr., Rebelution, Allan Stone, Julian Casablancas Big Freedia, Steve Winwood, The Devil Makes Three, Paper Diamond, Futurebirds, Tribal Seeds, Hey Rosetta!, Sleeper Agent, The Lumineers, and more.

=== 2013 ===
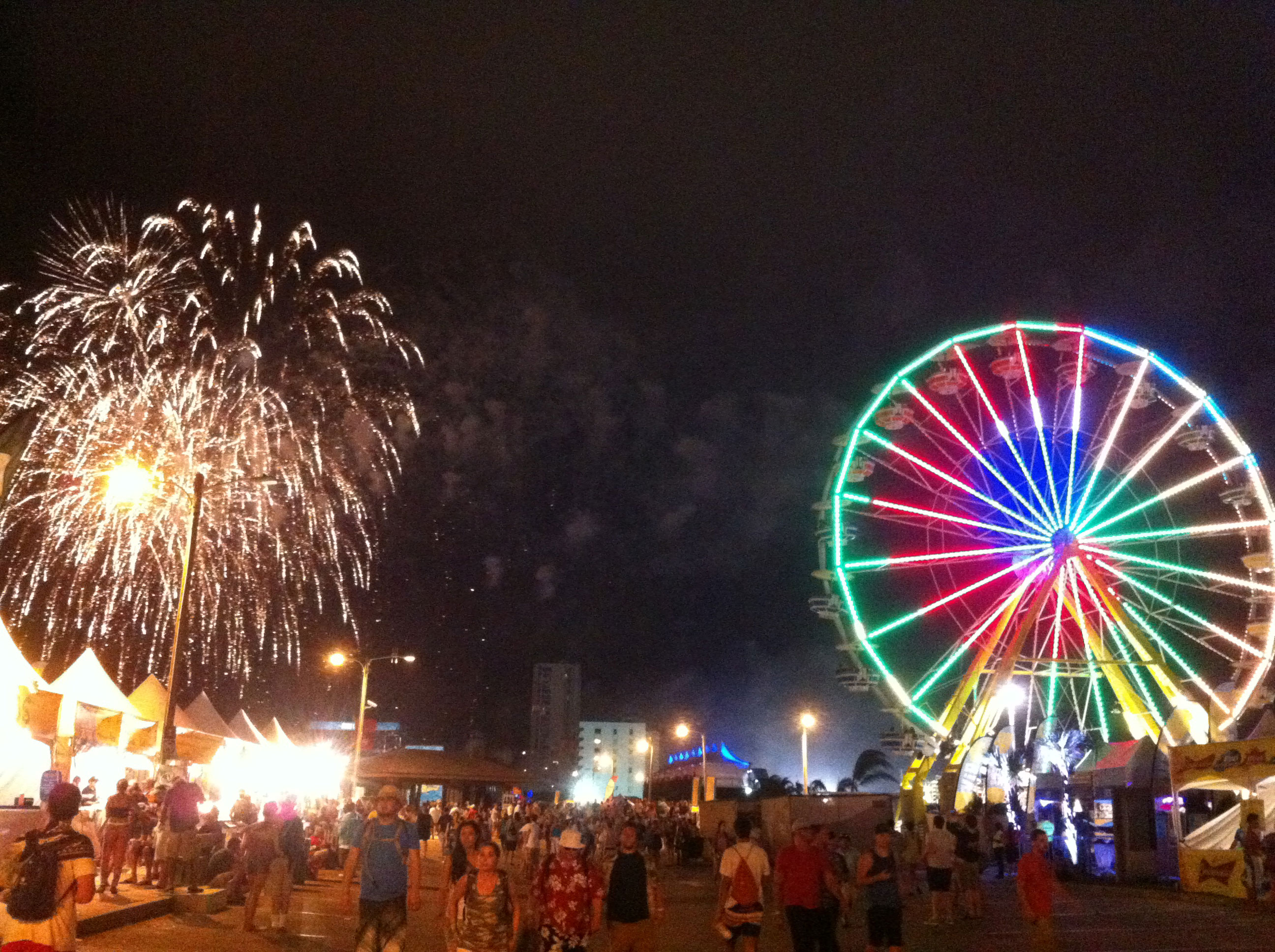
Fireworks and a ferris wheel as viewed from the boardwalk at Hangout 2013.

The 2013 festival took place May 17–19, 2013. Additional performers were announced March 6, 2013. The headliners were Kings of Leon, Tom Petty & The Heartbreakers, and Stevie Wonder. Other notable performers included: Trey Anastasio Band, The Shins, Twenty One Pilots, Bassnectar, Yeah Yeah Yeahs, Macklemore & Ryan Lewis, Kendrick Lamar, The Black Crowes, Slightly Stoopid, The Roots, The Bright Light Social Hour, Afrojack, Big Gigantic, Ra Ra Riot, Holy Ghost!, Baauer, Steve Aoki, Passion Pit, Ellie Goulding, Imagine Dragons, Bloc Party, Gov't Mule, Jim James, Porter Robinson, Public Enemy, Moe., Galactic, Dirty Projectors, Grouplove, Toots and the Maytals, Lissie, The Breeders, Best Coast, and more.

=== 2014 ===
The 2014 festival took place May 16–18, 2014. The headliners were The Black Keys, The Killers, and OutKast. Other notable performers included: Jack Johnson, Queens of the Stone Age, Pretty Lights, The Avett Brothers, Modest Mouse, The Flaming Lips, STS9, Wiz Khalifa, Zedd, Childish Gambino, Amos Lee, Conor Oberst, Tegan and Sara, Portugal. The Man, Fitz and the Tantrums, Capital Cities, Needtobreathe, Boys Noize, Bloody Beetroots, Ingrid Michaelson, Blackberry Smoke, Trombone Shorty & Orleans Avenue, Bastille, Allen Stone, The 1975, ALO, Claude VonStroke, Los Lobos, Andrew W.K., Black Lips, Moon Taxi, Little Green Cars, and more.

=== 2015 ===
The 2015 Hangout Music Festival took place May 15–17, 2015. The headliners were Foo Fighters, Jack Ü, Zac Brown Band, and Beck. Other notable performers included: Skrillex, My Morning Jacket, Foster The People, The Strokes Paramore, Spoon, Umphrey's McGee, Major Lazer, TV On The Radio, Phantogram, Jenny Lewis, Dirty Heads, Ragonk, Krewella, Adventure Club, Lupe Fiasco, Damian Marley, Cold War Kids, Future Islands, Vance Joy, Galactic with Macy Gray, and more.

=== 2016 ===
The 2016 Hangout Music Festival took place May 20–22, 2016. The Headliners were The Weeknd, Florence and the Machine, Panic at the Disco and Alabama Shakes. Other notable performers included Ellie Goulding, The Chainsmokers, Alessia Cara, Fetty Wap, X Ambassadors, The Neighborhood, Walk the Moon, HAIM, Grimes, Cage the Elephant, Run the Jewels, Foals, Lenny Kravitz, Portugal. the Man, Big Grams (Big Boi and Phantogram), Flume, Miike Snow, Courtney Barnett, Kurt Vile and the Violators, Vince Staples, Jason Isbell, Fetty Wap, Silversun Pickups, Mayer Hawthorne, Atlas Genius, Raury, HEALTH, Bully, Pell, and Bass Drum of Death. ***Worth mentioning Calvin Harris was set to headline Saturday the 21st, but had to cancel at the last minute due to a car accident in Las Vegas. Panic at the Disco went on to headline in his place.

=== 2017 ===
The 2017 Hangout Music Festival took place May 19–21, 2017. The Headliners were Mumford & Sons, Twenty One Pilots, Chance the Rapper and Phoenix. Other notable performers included Major Lazer, Weezer, MGMT, Sigur Ros, Marshmello, Migos, Dillon Francis, Band of Horses, The Head and the Heart, Tory Lanez, A$AP Ferg, Young the Giant, Franz Ferdinand, Charli XCX, Lukas Graham, Mac DeMarco, Local Natives, Rüfüs Du Sol, Lil Yachty, Warpaint and Cash Cash.

=== 2018 ===
The 2018 Hangout Music Festival took place May 18–20, 2018. The Headliners were The Killers, The Chainsmokers, and Kendrick Lamar. Other performers included Zedd, Portugal. The Man, Galantis, Cold War Kids, Halsey, Anderson Paak and the Free Nationals, Odesza, SZA, Foster the People, Awolnation, Blackbear, Oh Wonder, Tash Sultana, Lauv, Lost Kings, St. Vincent, Grouplove, Bleachers, Manchester Orchestra, Slightly Stoopid, Lil Pump, The Struts, Getter, NF, Greta Van Fleet, Anderson East, Dej Loaf, Pussy Riot, Nothing But Thieves, Banners, Tank and the Bangas, Cashmere Cat, Bahamas, Noname, San Holo, Whethan, Alice Merton, Max, AJR, Poolside, Hippo Campus, Melvv, Ron Gallo, The Green, The Glorious Sons, Caroline Rose, Bones, Son Little, Kasbo, Skip Marley, Goldfish, R.Lum.R, Mikky Ekko, Alex Lahey, Welshly Arms, Mansionair, Sunflower Bean, and Hotel Garuda.

=== 2019 ===
The 2019 Hangout Music Festival took place May 17–19, 2019. The headliners were Travis Scott, The Lumineers, Khalid, Vampire Weekend, Cardi B and Kygo. Other performers included were The 1975, Diplo, Hozier, GRiZ, Walk the Moon, Jimmy Eat World, Judah and the Lion, Bebe Rexha, Alison Wonderland, Jungle, Gorgon City, Quinn XCII, Bishop Briggs, Hippie Sabotage, Mura Masa, Arizona, Sofi Tukker, Sir Sly, Bazzi, Jonas Blue, King Princess, Lauren Daigle, Elohim, Loud Luxury, Bryce Vine, Lovelytheband, The Interrupters, Superorganism, MadeinTYO, Flora Cash, Two Feet, Jade Bird, Taylor Bennett, Pale Waves, Ravyn Lenae, Gang of Youths, Two Friends, Buddy, grandson, Shame, Elley Duhé, Moon Boots, Jesse Royal, Morgxn, Slenderbodies, Dr. Fresch, Justin Jay, The Him, The Band Camino, Castlecomer, Easy Life, Spencer Ludwig, and The Red Clay Strays.

=== 2020 ===
The 2020 Hangout Music Festival was set to take place May 15–17, 2020. The headliners were set to be the Red Hot Chili Peppers, Post Malone, Billie Eilish, Marshmello and Lana Del Rey. Other performers would have included Cage the Elephant, Illenium, Kane Brown, Rainbow Kitten Surprise, Louis the Child, RL Grime, The Head and the Heart, Jhené Aiko, Megan Thee Stallion, Finneas, Madeon, Quinn XCII, Moon Taxi, The Band Camino, Oliver Tree, T-Pain, Tove Lo, Big Wild, Wallows, Alec Benjamin, Bea Miller, Chelsea Cutler, Doja Cat, Dominic Fike, Getter, Jai Wolf, Mt. Joy, Omar Apollo, Orville Peck, Saint Jhn, Scarypoolparty, Shallou, Snakehips, Surfaces, Yungblud, The Aces, Barns Courtney, Blunts & Blondes, The Glorious Sons, MISSIO, SNBRN, Whipped Cream, 99 Neighbors, Bailey Bryan, Bren Joy, Dan Luke and the Raid, Duskus, Elderbrook, KennyHoopla, Lucii, Luttrell, Mattiel, Memba, NOTD, Paul Cauthen, Perto, Pluko, Raveena Aurora, Regard, Softest Hard, and Taska Black.

The 2020 Festival was cancelled amidst the COVID-19 pandemic.

=== 2021 ===
The 2021 Hangout Music Festival was scheduled to take place on May 14–16, 2021, but was postponed due to the ongoing COVID-19 pandemic. The event organizers suggested the possibility of hosting the festival in the fall depending on how the COVID-19 vaccination efforts go. Although never officially cancelled, nothing surfaced, and the festival did not end up taking place in 2021.

=== 2022 ===
The Hangout Music Festival in 2022 was scheduled for May 20–22, and required proof of COVID-19 vaccination. Headlining acts included Post Malone, Tame Impala, Halsey, Doja Cat, Fall Out Boy, ILLENIUM, and Megan Thee Stallion.

=== 2023 ===
The 2023 lineup features Red Hot Chili Peppers, SZA, Calvin Harris, Paramore & more. The event features many genres of music, including rock, indie, hip hop, and electronic dance music.

=== 2024 ===
The Hangout Music Festival in 2024 was scheduled for May 17–19. Headlining acts included Lana Del Rey, Zach Bryan, ODESZA, The Chainsmokers, Cage The Elephant, Dominic Fike, Renee Rapp, Jessie Murph, Alison Wonderland, Doechii, Nelly, Dom Dolla, Subtronics, Nle Choppa, Sexxy Red, A Day to Remember, Chappell Roan, Chromeo, Koe Wetzel, All time Low, David Kushner, Meagn Moroney, Disco Lines, Mat Maeson, Queen Herby, Troyboi, The Beaches, Del Water Gap, Dylan Gossett, Kasbo, Paul Russell, Wyatt Flores, Alana Springsteen. Austin Millz, Brandy Cyrus, Bunt., Coco & Breezy, Dasha, Eliza Rose, Flyana Boss, G Flip, Hemlocke Springs, Inji, Le Youth, LF System, Little Starnger, Odd Mob and The Stews.

== See also ==
- Hangout Music Festival line-ups
- Bayfest (Mobile, Alabama)
- Bonnaroo Music Festival (Manchester, Tennessee)
- List of jam band music festivals
- List of bluegrass music festivals
