= Let the Record Play =

Let the Record Play may refer to:

- "Let the Record Play", a song by Ugly Kid Joe from Uglier Than They Used ta Be
- "Let the Record Play", a song and album by Moon Taxi
- Let the Record Play (album)
