= Icekream =

Dubai music producer

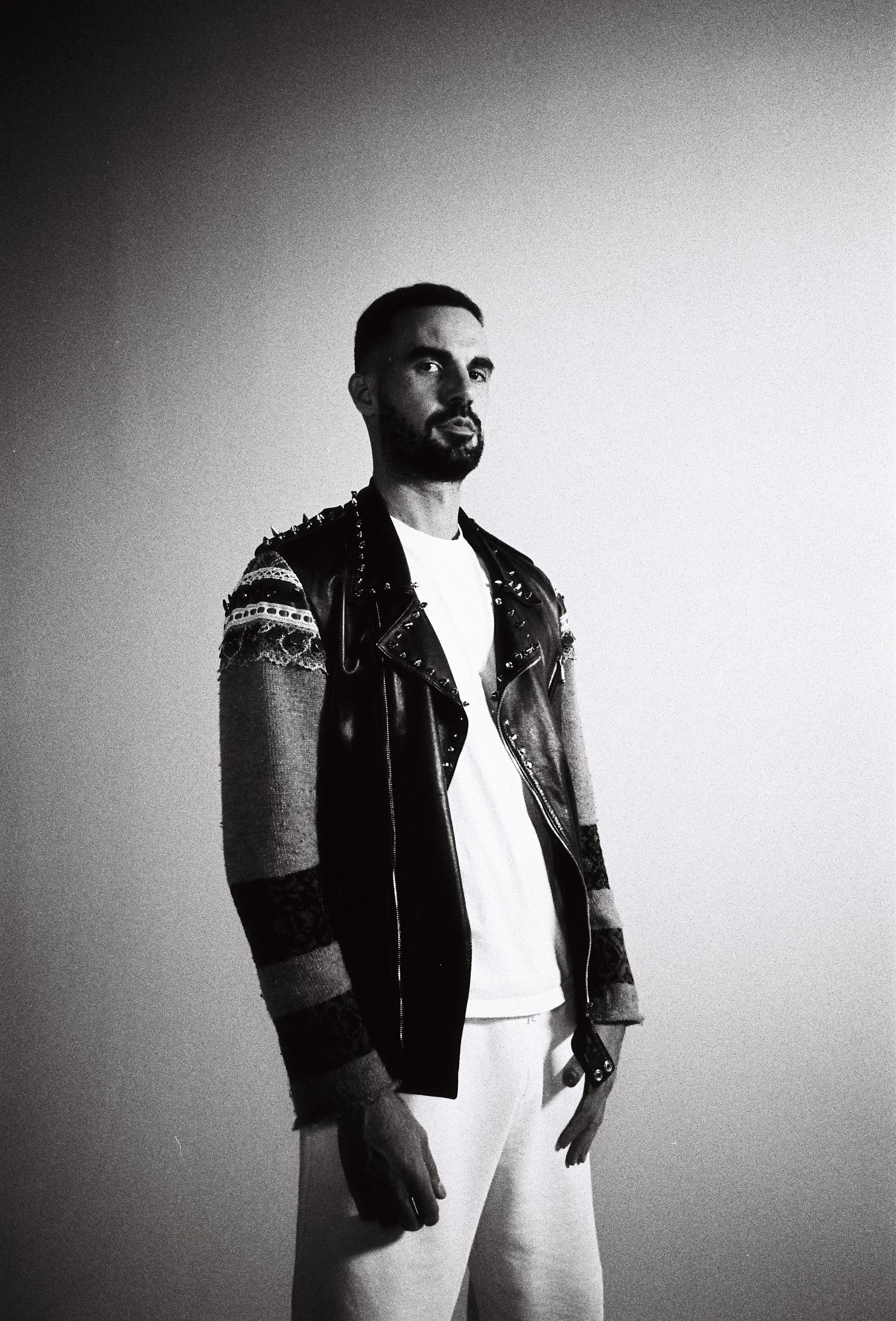

Issam B S Freiha (born September 22, 1985), known professionally as icekream, is a Dubai & Miami-based music producer.

== Early life ==
Growing up in Paris, France to American & Lebanese/Emirati parents - from an early age, icekream was exposed to a very active - local & international - Hip-Hop & House scene. The electronic revolution led by acts such as Daft Punk & Modjo, was approaching fever-pitch levels during the peak of his youth. He was greatly inspired by a vast array of acts, from Jamiroquai, Fatboy Slim, DJ Premier, Dr. Dre, The Neptunes, Michael Jackson and IAM.

== Music career ==
In early 2011, icekream founded the record label 'E11 Entertainment' and subsequently signed his first artist 'Lyrican'. 2012 and onwards saw his rise via the SoundCloud platform at a time when Trap/EDM music had become increasingly popular. icekream began sharing his music & DJ'ing in clubs & venues around London, Paris, the US & UAE. In 2013 icekream met artist Wyclef in Abu Dhabi & proceeded to produce his song 'Trap N Roll' feat. Waka Flocka.

2017 saw the release of his first major single 'Hear Dat' alongside TroyBoi via Parlophone Records/Warner Music Group. In mid-2018, he was noticed by a two-time Grammy Award-winning duo Cool & Dre, with who he signed a placement deal with. Shortly afterwards, icekream unveiled his brand-new EP, a 5-track delivery titled 'Night Feel', made in collaboration with Saudi rapper Jeed.

In 2019, icekream founded Kream Kingdom, a boutique record label based in Miami, FL. His first placement came in 2020 for artist Eric Leon's 'Lemme See'. Early 2021, icekream released his singles 'Real Rap', 'LID' & 'Romantico'. He primarily featured NY-based Hip Hop artist Prayah.

Early 2021, icekream released his singles 'What it Be' and 'Runners Pace'; the first of his collaborations with 20-year-old Egyptian born, DC based Mo Sella. In 2022, icekream released single Ablaze. In 2022 Kream Kingdom signed a new artist: the Cuban-born & Miami-living El Larra. His EP 'Mi Oportunidad' was released on September 2.
