= Tenova =

- Origin: Pittsburgh, Pennsylvania.
- Genres: House; techno
- Occupations: DJ; producer; songwriter
- Labels: Toolroom Records, CR2 Records, Country Club Disco, Elrow Music
- Website: djtenova.com

Tenova, born Thomas Hricik, is an American DJ, producer and songwriter from Pittsburgh, Pennsylvania.

== Career ==
In 2015, Tenova collaborated with Los Angeles-based producer Eric Sharp on "Slow Me Down", a single featuring vocals by Australian singer Erin Marshall. The song was released through Sharp's record label RIS Labs. Prior to the song's creation, Tenova met Sharp and asked him if he had any 'drafts' which he could work on before editing it. Marshall was then contacted to add vocals to the song. In 2016, Tenova collaborated with Sharp again to release the single "Hallucination" through Tommie Sunshine's label Brooklyn Fire. The duo also remixed Mansions on the Moon's song "The Truth". The remix received notable radio support from Jason Bentley on KCRW's Metropolis.

In 2017, Tenova released "The River," with Toolroom Records. The track went on to receive airplay from English DJs Pete Tong and Mark Knight, as well as Benny Benassi. Currently, Tenova is living in Europe.

In 2018, Tenova spent a considerable amount of time in the country of Georgia, where he wrote his second piece for Toolroom Records, "Minda." Regarding his time there, he was quoted as saying: "I wanted to honor my time in both of these places by making a track that was very much inspired by both. Sample-based music is just a culmination of your life experiences in many ways, as every sound you choose resonates with some part of you as a person."

== Discography ==
=== Extended plays ===
Title	Details
Faultless	Released: November 17, 2014; Label: Stem & Leaf; Format: Digital download

=== Singles ===
Title	Year
"Slow Me Down" (with Eric Sharp)	2015
"Hallucination" (with Eric Sharp)	2016
"The River"	2017
"Longlegs"	2018
"Fountayne"	2018
"Beaga"	2018
"Pump It Up"	2018
"Minda"	2018

== Appearances ==
On November 22, 2021, Tenova appeared on Episode 12 of the Traveling To Consciousness Podcast with Clayton Cuteri. On it, he discussed his career as a DJ. He discussed how he began DJing in Pittsburgh and the journey that took him to travel the world to play his music. He talks about how he started his own business and how it seems like the path for him - for now. Tenova and Clayton recorded for over one hour and 51 minutes.
