= Concord Records =

American record label

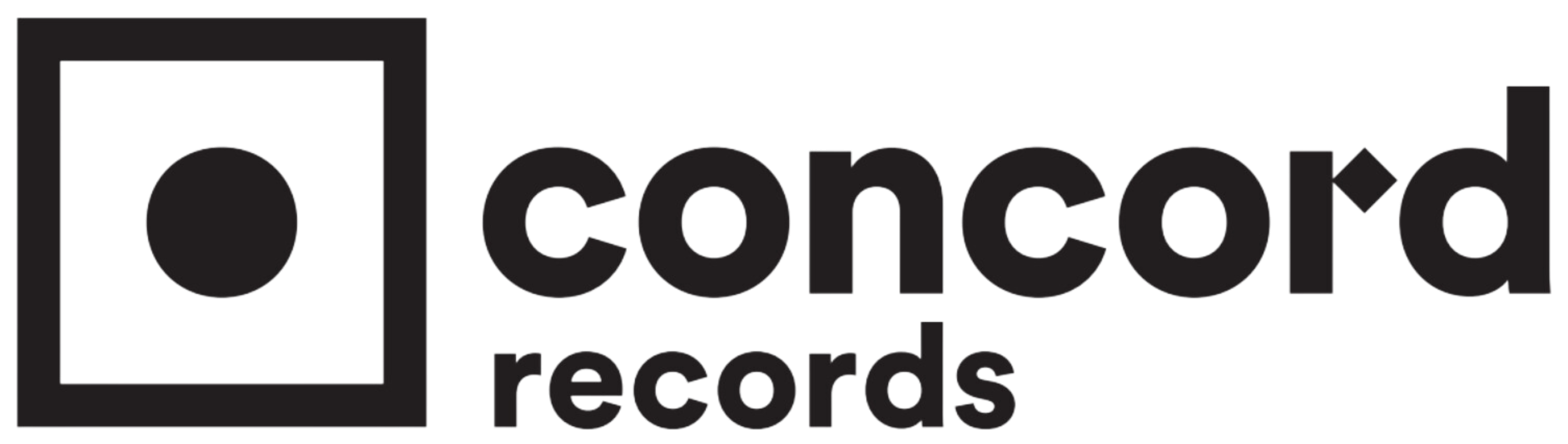
- Parent company: Concord (until 2026); BMG (since 2026)
- Founded: 1995; 31 years ago
- Distributor: Universal Music Group (worldwide releases)
- Genre: Jazz; pop; rock; blues
- Country of origin: United States
- Location: Los Angeles, California
- Official website: concordrecords.com

Concord Records is an American record label owned by BMG and based in Los Angeles, California. Concord Records was launched in 1995 as an imprint designed to reach beyond the company's foundational Concord Jazz label. The label's artists have won 14 Grammy Awards and 88 Grammy nominations.

The original logo, a stylized eighth note incorporating the C and J of "Concord Jazz", was created by Bay Area graphic designer Dan Buck, who also worked on several album covers for the company.

== History ==
In 1999, Concord Records was purchased by a consortium led by Hal Gaba and television producer Norman Lear. Its offices were moved from Concord, California to Beverly Hills in 2002. That same year, Concord partnered with Starbucks to release Ray Charles's Genius Loves Company, which won eight GRAMMY Awards, including Album of the Year.

Concord Records purchased the Fantasy Label Group in 2004, and in December 2006 announced the reactivation of the Stax Records label as a forum for newly recorded music.

In 2005, it was announced that Concord Records had purchased Telarc Records and its subsidiary Heads Up, in a deal whose terms were not divulged.

In 2007, Concord Records started the Hear Music label in association with Starbucks, signing such artists as Paul McCartney, Joni Mitchell, and John Mellencamp. Although Starbucks ceased to be an active partner a year later, Concord kept Hear active, having a Top 5 album in 2010 with Carole King and James Taylor's Live at the Troubadour.

In 2008, Village Roadshow Pictures Group and Concord Music Group completed their merger, resulting in the creation of the Village Roadshow Entertainment Group.

Kenny G signed to Concord in early 2008, Herb Alpert in early 2009. On June 5, 2009, Dave Koz signed to Concord.

In 2010, it was announced that Paul McCartney's solo and Wings catalogs would be globally distributed by Concord Music Group.

In April 2026, Concord agreed to combine its business with BMG in a transaction that would create a largest independent music company. On June 12, 2026, the merger was approved by the German Federal Cartel Office. On June 17, 2026, the merger was approved by the US competition authorities and the merger was completed on September 1, 2026.

== Current artists ==
- Ben Williams
- Benny Reid
- Bethany Cosentino
- Bill Evans
- Billy Gibbons
- Boney James
- Bud Shank
- Cal Tjader
- Carl Fontana
- Castlecomer
- Charlie Byrd
- Chick Corea
- Christian Scott
- Clare Fischer
- Danielle Nicole
- Dave Brubeck
- Dave Koz
- Dave McKenna
- David Pack
- Dee Bell
- Dennis Rowland
- Dirty Dozen Brass Band
- Elbow
- Elvis Costello
- Ernestine Anderson
- Esperanza Spalding
- Fantasia Barrino
- Fourplay
- Frank Vignola
- Fraser MacPherson
- Gene Harris
- George Benson
- George Shearing
- Hiromi Uehara
- Herb Ellis
- I Dont Know How but They Found Me
- Jake Hanna
- James Taylor
- Jamison Ross
- Javier Colon
- Jonny Lang
- Karrin Allyson
- Kate Higgins
- Ken Peplowski
- Kenny G
- Kenny Wayne Shepherd
- Kristin Chenoweth
- Kurt Elling
- L.S. Dunes
- Lindsey Stirling
- Lizz Wright
- Michael Feinstein
- Molly Ringwald
- Nnenna Freelon
- The Offspring
- Paul Simon
- Poncho Sanchez
- Postmodern Jukebox
- Quiana Lynell
- Rachael MacFarlane
- Ramsey Lewis
- Rob McConnell
- Rosemary Clooney
- Santana
- Sarah McLachlan
- Stefon Harris
- Steve Perry
- Stokley Williams
- Sérgio Mendes
- The New Pornographers
- The Record Company
- Thirty Seconds to Mars
- Valerie June
- Tears for Fears
- Zella Day
- The Revivalists

== Former artists ==
- AFI
- Barry Manilow
- Casey Abrams
- Haley Reinhart
- Michael Bolton
- Terence Blanchard
- Tony Bennett
- Dionne Warwick
- Dawes
- R.E.M.

== See also ==
- List of record labels
