= Warlordz =

Single by TroyBoi featuring Skrillex
- Released: 21 June 2019
- Genre: Dubstep
- Length: 3:18
- Label: Owsla
- Songwriters: Troy Henry; Sonny Moore
- Producers: TroyBoi; Skrillex

TroyBoi singles chronology
"Solid" (2018)	"Warlordz" (2019)

Skrillex singles chronology
"Face My Fears" (2019)	"Warlordz" (2019)	"Mumbai Power" (2019)

"Warlordz" (stylised in all caps) is a song by British electronic music producer TroyBoi featuring American record producer Skrillex, released on 21 June 2019 through Owsla.

== Background and release ==
On 6 June 2019, Skrillex first previewed the song under the title "War Cry" while live streaming on Instagram while he was travelling to the electronic dance music festival Ultra Korea. A clip of the live stream showcasing the song was posted to the r/Skrillex subreddit, though it was reported that Skrillex announced the song's release date earlier in the live stream as the week after, this was not captured in the clip.

On 16 June, the song was previewed during a live-set by TroyBoi and Skrillex at Paradiso Festival, with the song later being announced as "Warlordz". It was further announced that the song was to be released the week after.

On 21 June, the song was released as a digital download on international digital stores through American record label Owsla, as well as being released through various music streaming services. The song's artwork was created by Spanish painter Sanjulián and was adapted by Marilyn Hue and Jade Fenix Hobday to depict TroyBoi and Skrillex fighting a horde of gorillas.

== Critical reception ==
"Warlordz" was well received by most critics. Bella Bagshaw of Dancing Astronaut called the song "boisterous", and that it was "intuitively named for its audacious architects", finalising her review by stating that the track "exudes the complexity and dexterity of its creators, oscillating between throaty Asian vocals and tender piano-driven interludes." Your EDM's Matthew Meadow noted that even though Skrillex only gets credited as a featured artist, it does not make his contributions to the song "any less bombastic" and that the style of both artists being "clearly presented in this 3-minute tribal bass journey", with TroyBoi's style of trap and bass music feeling "right at home" alongside Skrillex's heavy wobbles and punchy synths. Writing for T.H.E – Music Essentials, Pavan Kumar praised the song, mainly focusing on Skrillex's contributions to the song, calling such "raw, subtle and yet, ever-engaging" and his quality of work would make you go "absolutely berserk."

== Track listing ==
Digital download – Single
No.	Title	Length
1.	"Warlordz" (featuring Skrillex)	3:18
Total length:		3:18

== Release history ==
Region	Date	Format	Version	Label	Ref.
Worldwide	21 June 2019	Digital download	"Warlordz"	Owsla	
