= Mansions on the Moon =

American band

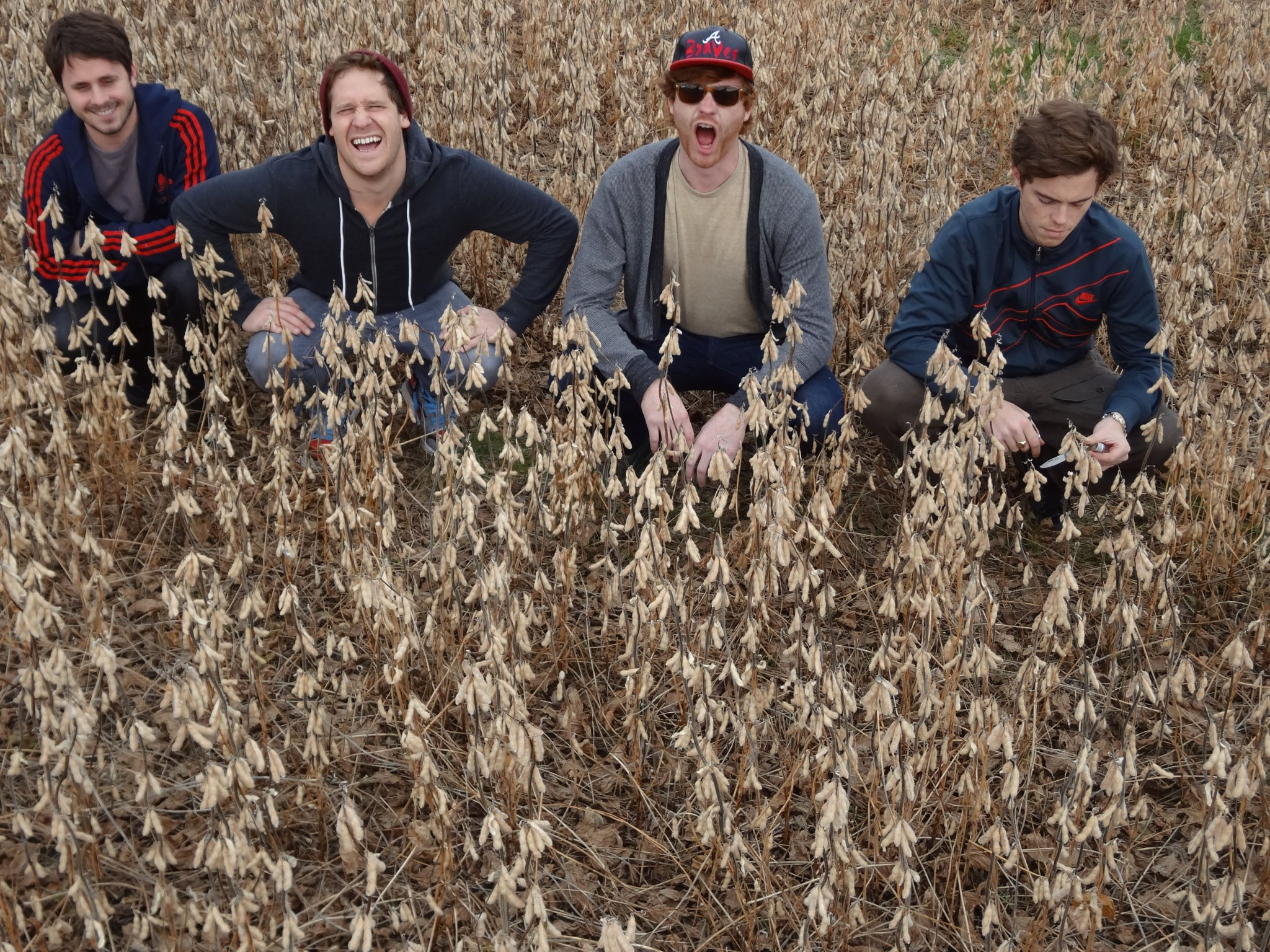

Background information
- Origin: Los Angeles, California, U.S.
- Genres: Electronic; hip hop; indie rock; synth-pop
- Years active: 2010–2017
- Members: Ted Wendler; Jeff Maccora; Lane Shaw
- Past members: Ben Hazlegrove

Mansions on the Moon was an American band from Los Angeles, California.

== History ==
The group was formed by Ted Wendler on guitar and vocals, Ben Hazlegrove on keyboards, and Lane Shaw on drums. Both Shaw and Hazlegrove were also members of Pnuma Trio.

In 2010, the group released the debut mixtape, Paradise Falls, presented by Diplo and DJ Benzi. Hypetrak called the group one of the "most interesting recording artists to have emerged this year." Paradise Falls includes collaborations with Xaphoon Jones (of Chiddy Bang) and Big Gigantic, among others. Pharrell Williams served as executive producer on the group's 2012 EP, Lightyears.

The group has produced official remixes for Foster the People and Zee Avi, and produced the Mac Miller track "PA Nights" on the album Blue Slide Park. In 2011, the group joined Wiz Khalifa and Mac Miller on the Green Carpet Tour. In 2012, the group played South by Southwest and the Lightyears Tour, and charted on Billboard's Next Big Sound.

In 2013, the group released the Full Moon EP. It featured collaborations with Zee Avi, Codi Caraco, and Paper Diamond. The group's Full Moon EP was followed up in 2014 by the self-titled album, Mansions on the Moon. According to bassist, Jeff Maccora, many of the songs on the album were inspired by the group's move to Los Angeles.

The group disbanded in 2017. Frontman Ted Wendler is pursuing a solo career under the name Ted When.

== Members ==
Current members

- Ted Wendler - guitar, keyboards, vocals
- Lane Shaw - drums
- Jeff Maccora - bass guitar, keyboards

Former members

- Ben Hazlegrove - keyboards, vocals

== Discography ==
=== Studio albums ===
- Mansions on the Moon (2014)

=== Mixtapes ===
- Paradise Falls (2010)

=== EPs ===
- Lightyears (2012)
- Full Moon (2013)
- Lost and Found (2013)

=== Singles ===
- "Don't Tell (Ryan Lofty Remix)" (2015)

=== Remixes ===
- Foster the People - "Life on the Nickel (Mansions on the Moon Remix)" (2011)
- Zee Avi - "Concrete Wall (Mansions on the Moon Remix)" (2012)

=== Guest appearances ===
- Fred Falke - "It's a Memory" (2016)
