= Celabrasion =

Studio album by Sleeper Agent
- Released: August 2, 2011(Digital); September 27, 2011(Physical)
- Genre: Alternative rock
- Label: Mom + Pop Music
- Producer: Jay Joyce

Singles from Celabraison
- 1. "Get It Daddy" Released: April 26, 2011; 2. "Get Burned" Released: January 17, 2012

Professional ratings
Review scores
Source	Rating
Consequence of Sound	3.5/5 stars
Rolling Stone	3.5/5 stars
SYFFAL (syffal.com)	9/10 stars
Mezzic	(8.5/10)
AllMusic	3.5/5 stars

Celabrasion is the debut album by American rock band Sleeper Agent. The album was produced by Jay Joyce and released digitally on iTunes on August 2, 2011, via Mom + Pop Music and physically on September 27, 2011.

== Singles ==
The first single from the album "Get It Daddy" was released as iTunes "Free Single of the Week" on April 26, 2011. The song has been licensed for use in various promotions and campaigns. The second single, "Get Burned," was released on January 17, 2012.

== Track listing ==
All tracks are written by Tony Smith.

No.	Title	Length
1.	"Get It Daddy"	2:25
2.	"Force a Smile"	2:53
3.	"Shuga Cane"	2:27
4.	"Love Blood"	2:43
5.	"Bottomed Out"	2:30
6.	"Proper Taste"	2:54
7.	"That's My Baby"	3:35
8.	"Get Burned"	2:55
9.	"Some White Blinds"	3:27
10.	"Be My Monster"	2:45
11.	"All Wave and No Goodbye"	3:13
12.	"Far and Wide"	3:27

== Personnel ==
=== Sleeper Agent ===
- Alex Kandel – vocals
- Tony Smith – guitar/vocals
- Justin Wilson – drums
- Scott Gardner – keys/synths
- Lee Williams – Bass guitar
- Josh Martin – lead guitar

=== Additional performances ===
- Zach Lindsey – bass (on tracks 1–4, 6–10)
- Jay Joyce – piano

=== Technical personnel ===
- Jay Joyce – Producer
- Jason Hall – Engineer
- Matt Wheeler – Assistant engineer
- Matt Agoglia – Mastering
