= Let the Record Play (album) =

Studio album by Moon Taxi
- Released: January 19, 2018
- Recorded: 2017
- Genre: Alternative rock
- Length: 35:08
- Label: RCA Records
- Producer: Spencer Thomson

Moon Taxi chronology
Daybreaker (2015)	Let the Record Play (2018)	Silver Dream (2021)

Singles from Let the Record Play
- 1. "Two High" Released: May 5, 2017; 2. "Let the Record Play" Released: November 17, 2017; 3. "Good As Gold" Released: December 8, 2017; 4. "Not Too Late" Released: January 12, 2018

Professional ratings
Review scores
Source	Rating
AllMusic	3/5 stars
Alternative Addiction	4/5 stars

Let the Record Play is the fifth studio album by American alt-rock group Moon Taxi. It was released on January 19, 2018, and was the band's first with RCA Records.

== Background and release ==
On May 5, 2017, Moon Taxi released a single, "Two High". On November 17, 2017, Taxi and RCA Records announced that the band's fifth album, entitled Let the Record Play, would be released January 19, 2018. An eponymous single was released with the album announcement. The news came a little bit more than two months after RCA had signed the band. Moon Taxi lead vocalist Trevor Terndrup later said that the album had been finished before the deal with RCA came about. "Good As Gold" was released as the third single off the album on December 8, 2017, and "Not Too Late" was released as the fourth single off the album a week before the album's release. Two High and Not Too Late both charted on the Adult Alternative Songs chart, with the former peaking at third position and the latter peaking at position 22.

== Track listing ==
All tracks are written by Moon Taxi, except where otherwise indicated.

No.	Title	Writer(s)	Length
1.	"Let the Record Play"		3:07
2.	"Not Too Late"		3:15
3.	"Good as Gold"	Kevin Griffin	3:12
4.	"Two High"		3:33
5.	"No More Worry"		3:52
6.	"Moving to the City"		4:00
7.	"Nothing Can Keep Us Apart"		3:17
8.	"Keep Me Coming"		3:03
9.	"Trouble"		4:24
10.	"The Way"		3:25
Total length:			35:08

== Charts ==
Chart (2018)	Peak position
US Heatseekers Albums (Billboard)	5
