= Places We Don't Know =

Studio album by Kasbo
- Released: 23 March 2018
- Recorded: Gothenburg, Sweden
- Genre: Electronic, future bass, house
- Label: Counter Records; Family Foreign Collective
- Producer: Carl Garsbo

Kasbo chronology
Umbrella Club EP (2015)	Places We Don't Know (2018)

Singles from Places We Don't Know
- 1. "Lay It on Me" Released: 28 June 2017; 2. "Bleed It Out" Released: 24 October 2017; 3. "Snow In Gothenburg" Released: 12 December 2017; 4. "Aldrig Mer" Released: 18 January 2018; 5. "Your Tempo" Released: 13 February 2018; 6. "Over You" Released: 13 March 2018

Places We Don't Know is the debut studio album by the Swedish electronic music producer Kasbo, released on 23 March 2018 through Counter Records and Family Foreign Collective.

== Singles ==
The album's first single, "Lay It on Me" featuring Keiynan Lonsdale, was released on 28 June 2017. The second and third singles, "Bleed It Out" featuring Nea and "Snow In Gothenburg", were released 24 October and 12 December respectively. Both songs received music videos.

The fourth single, "Aldrig Mer" featuring TENDER, was released 18 January 2018 alongside the announcement of Places We Don't Know. The fifth and sixth singles, "Your Tempo" and "Over You" featuring Frida Sundemo were released 13 February and 13 March respectively.

== Tour ==
On 19 January 2018, Kasbo announced several headlining shows for the Places We Don't Know Tour. On February 12, BAYNK was revealed as an opening act for several of the shows.

== Track listing ==
No.	Title	Length
1.	"Bara Du"	2:33
2.	"Your Tempo"	3:19
3.	"Aldrig Mer" (featuring TENDER)	4:03
4.	"Roots" (featuring Amanda Fondell)	3:46
5.	"Snow in Gothenburg"	3:43
6.	"Stay with Me"	3:43
7.	"About You"	3:07
8.	"Over You" (featuring Frida Sundemo)	3:53
9.	"Bleed It Out" (featuring Nea)	3:38
10.	"Lay It on Me" (featuring Keiynan Lonsdale)	3:44
11.	"Places We Don't Know"	3:24
12.	"The Voice Says" (featuring Charlie Kim)	3:50
13.	"All Stood Still (Outro)"	1:50
Total length:		43:32
