= Two High =

Single by Moon Taxi

from the album Let the Record Play
- Released: May 5, 2017
- Length: 3:33
- Label: RCA
- Songwriter(s): Trevor Terndrup; Spencer Thomson; Tommy Putnam; Wes Bailey; Tyler Ritter
- Producer(s): Spencer Thomson

Moon Taxi singles chronology
"All Day All Night" (2015)	"Two High" (2017)	"Let the Record Play" (2017)

Music video
- "Two High" on YouTube

"Two High" is a song recorded by American alt-rock band Moon Taxi, and is the lead single off the band's fifth studio album, Let the Record Play. The song was written by the band and was produced by guitarist Spencer Thomson. It was released on May 5, 2017.

== Background ==
Lead vocalist Trevor Terndrup cited the peace sign as inspiration for the song, and said that the song was about hope and acceptance. The song came about when band member Wes Bailey's phone autocorrected the phrase "too high" to "two high", evoking images of the peace sign. A music video for the song was released on November 9, 2017.

In 2021, the band re-recorded the track as a duet with Hawaiian ukulele player Jake Shimabukuro for his album Jake & Friends.

== Performance ==
"Two High" garnered over 64 million streams on Spotify.

== Charts ==
=== Weekly charts ===
Chart (2017)	Peak position
Canada Rock (Billboard)	33
Norway (VG-lista)	27
Sweden (Sverigetopplistan)	46
Switzerland (Schweizer Hitparade)	82
UK Indie (OCC)	9
US Hot Rock & Alternative Songs (Billboard)	26
US Rock Airplay (Billboard)	10

=== Year-end charts ===
Chart (2017)	Position
US Hot Rock Songs (Billboard)	86
Chart (2018)	Position
US Rock Airplay (Billboard)	43

== Certifications ==
Region	Certification	Certified units/sales
Canada (Music Canada)	Gold	40,000^{‡}
^{‡} Sales+streaming figures based on certification alone.
