= Sleeper Agent (band) =

American band

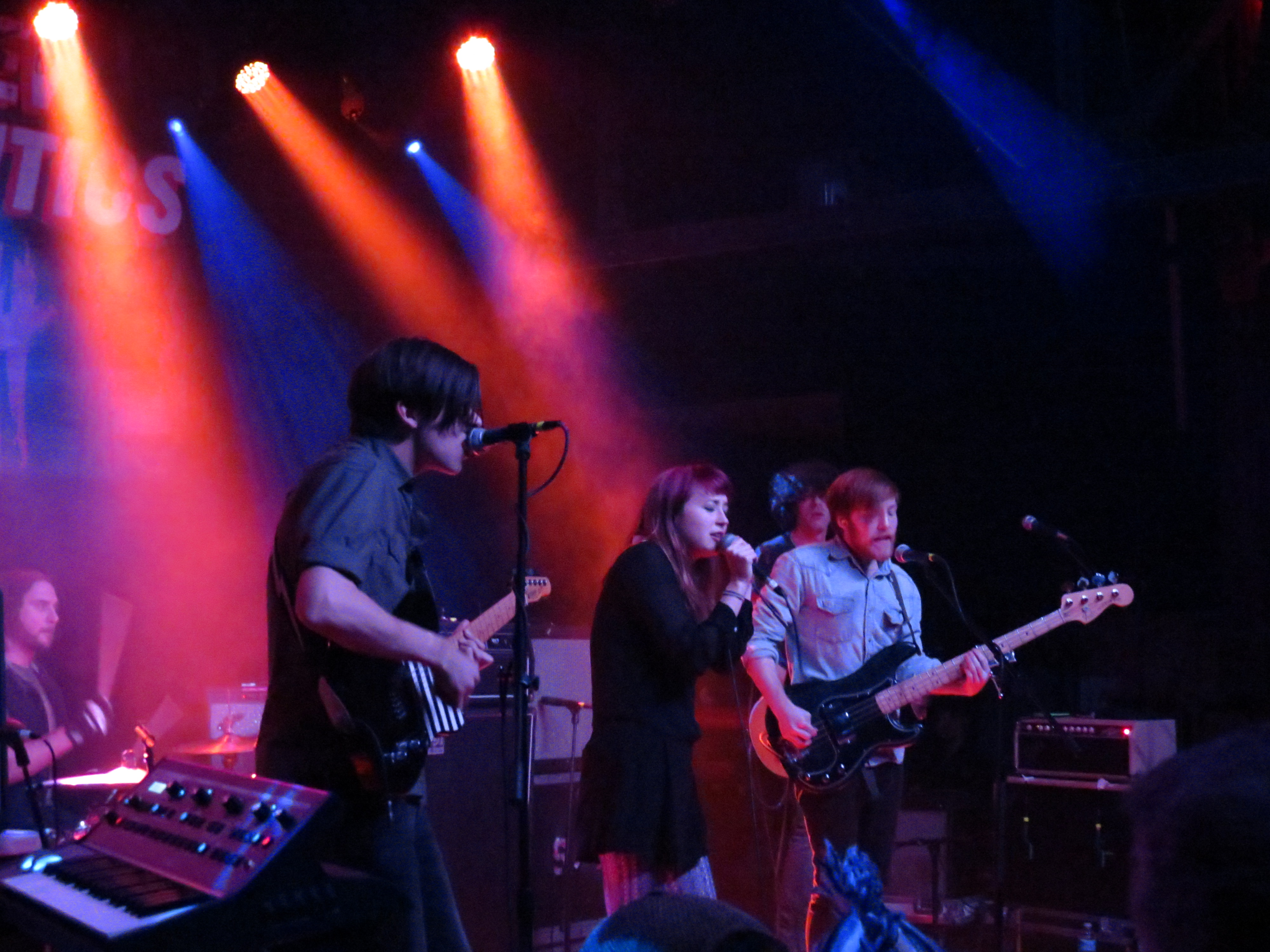
- Sleeper Agent performing in 2014

Background information
- Origin: Bowling Green, Kentucky, United States
- Genres: Alternative rock
- Years active: 2009–2015
- Labels: Mom + Pop Music; RCA
- Members: Alex Kandel; Tony Smith; Justin Wilson; Lee Williams; Scott Gardner; Josh Martin
- Website: www.sleeperagentmusic.com

Sleeper Agent was an American band from Bowling Green, Kentucky, United States. Their debut album, Celabrasion, was released on September 27, 2011, following the digital release of the album in August. Rolling Stone noted the group as a "band to watch" prior to the LP's release.

== History ==
After a few "unremarkable gigs" as a musical duo, guitarist Tony Smith and drummer Justin Wilson recruited the young Alex Kandel as a vocalist after discovering her working as a barista and, "doing Adele covers on open-mic nights." The band gained their current lineup after recruiting Williams, Gardner, and Martin. A short time later, they were discovered by producer Jay Joyce, who prompted them to record their debut LP Celabrasion, which was released through iTunes on August 2, 2011, followed by a physical release on September 27 the same year. The first single from the album, "Get It Daddy", was featured as iTunes' "Free Single of the Week" in late July/early August of that year. Sleeper Agent went on to tour with Cage the Elephant in late 2011. They were invited to play the Weezer Cruise in January 2012 pairing them with musical acts such as Dinosaur Jr., Sebadoh, and Wavves. Sleeper Agent went on to support Fun. from February 29 through March 11 of 2012. Their tour continued through early May with the Texas wunderkind Ben Kweller. The band was featured on Late Night with Jimmy Fallon on March 23, 2012. Sleeper Agent played the Coachella Valley Music and Arts Festival in Indio, California, on April 15 and 22, 2012. They also played The Hangout Music Festival in late May of the same year. After a few intermittent shows throughout June and July, the band played the Forecastle Festival in Louisville, Kentucky, and then opened for Weezer at two shows in late July. Sleeper Agent also played the Starry Nights Music Festival (hosted by Cage the Elephant) outside of Bowling Green, in late September 2012. That same month, singer Alex Kandel was nominated for the Women who Rock competition for a spot on the cover of Rolling Stone.

The band appeared on Doug Benson's podcast "Doug Loves Movies", with guest Graham Elwood.

Their second album, About Last Night, was released on March 25, 2014.

After the band toured their way through 2014, even playing on The Late Show with David Letterman on July 9, 2014, they had set up tour dates in early 2014 with the band New Politics. The band had become inactive on social media and Sleeper Agent had not played any shows for most of 2015, with the only news to come out from the members was news of side projects and Alex Kandel being a possible contestant for the show The Voice, although she had once tweeted about the band possibly having new material back in May 2015.

On September 29, 2015, Tony Smith had posted a picture of the band on Sleeper Agents Facebook and Twitter reading "2010-2015". Tony had posted with the picture "The 5 best years of my life... so far." - Lurve, @tnysmth". He had also stated in another post on Twitter, "Cat's officially out of the bag. Sleeper Agent aren't [sic] together anymore. There's no bad blood and we're all still friends. #neversaynever" officially stating that the band had broken up. Finally, Alex stated, as well, that the band "hit this plateau and we decided to part ways and try other things." She talked about the band in the past tense and said her time in Sleeper Agent is over.

As of September 29, 2015, Alex had appeared on NBC's The Voice as a contestant choosing to work with Gwen Stefani.

== Musical style and influences ==
The band's official Facebook profile lists a number of bands as their influences, including The Pixies, The Black Lips, Foxy Shazam, and Cage the Elephant, the latter being another part of the growing Bowling Green music scene and close friends with the band. Rolling Stone described the band as "Shaggy Kentucky kids whose songs are sweet, fizzy, and combustible as a can of shook soda." "They are the best people on earth," states Matt Shultz of Cage the Elephant.

The band's spontaneous, energetic sound can be traced to an incident at a Fourth of July party, when drummer Justin Wilson was sucker punched by the drummer of a rival band, inspiring Wilson to channel aggression and his punk attitude into his playing.

== Band members ==
- Alex Kandel - vocals (born October 17, 1992) She took part in season 9 of the American talent competition The Voice. She auditioned with "Bright" from Echosmith and became part of "Team Gwen" (Gwen Stefani). She was eliminated in the Battles Round on October 13, 2015, after singing "It's My Life" against Team Gwen contestant Kota Wade
- Tony Smith - guitar & vocals
- Justin Wilson - drums
- Lee Williams - bass
- Scott Gardner - keyboard & synth
- Josh Martin - lead guitar

== Discography ==
=== Studio albums ===
- Celabrasion (2011)
- About Last Night (2014)

=== Extended plays ===
- InterroBANG!? (EP) (2010)
