= Daybreaker (Moon Taxi album) =

Studio album by Moon Taxi
- Released: October 2, 2015
- Producer: Jacquire King

Moon Taxi chronology
Mountains Beaches Cities (2013)	Daybreaker (2015)	Let the Record Play (2018)

Professional ratings
Review scores
Source	Rating
AllMusic	3/5 stars
Rolling Stone	3/5 stars

Daybreaker is the fourth studio album by American rock group Moon Taxi. It was released on 2 October 2015.

== Track listing ==
No.	Title	Writer(s)	Length
1.	"Year Zero"	Moon Taxi	3:38
2.	"All Day All Night"	Moon Taxi	3:51
3.	"Run Right Back"	Moon Taxi	3:21
4.	"Savannah"	Moon Taxi	4:21
5.	"Ready To Go"	Moon Taxi	3:41
6.	"Make Your Mind Up"	Moon Taxi	3:33
7.	"Who's To Say?"	Moon Taxi	3:56
8.	"Always"	Moon Taxi	4:09
9.	"Domino"	Moon Taxi	3:34
10.	"Red Hot Lights"	Moon Taxi	3:30
11.	"Rooftops"	Moon Taxi	3:49
Total length:			41:23
