= Fort Atlantic =

American rock band

- Origin: Birmingham, Alabama
- Genres: Indie rock, folk rock
- Years active: 2010–present
- Label: Dualtone
- Members: Jon Black; Gus Berry; Tim Coulter; Evan Railton
- Past members: Josh Cannon
- Website: www.fortatlantic.com

Fort Atlantic is an American indie rock band based in Portland, Oregon.

== History ==
Jon Black founded Fort Atlantic in 2010 following the dissolution of a record label he had owned and operated in Athens, Georgia. Black began recording songs in a home studio and collaborated with drummer Josh Cannon to prepare them for live performances. The group released three EPs between 2010 and 2011, after which Black worked with producer Tom Schick on a full-length album.

In 2012, Fort Atlantic signed with Dualtone Records and released a self-titled debut album. The album reached No. 32 on the Billboard Heatseekers chart. In addition to CD and digital formats, it was also released as a Nintendo cartridge.

Songs from the album appeared in a season-six episode of Californication and in The Final Page, a season-eight episode of How I Met Your Mother, as well as in the third season of Longmire. Following the album’s release, the band performed at the Bonnaroo Music Festival.

== Band members ==
Current

- Jon Black – vocals, guitars, keyboards, synthesizers, programming
- Gus Berry – guitars, keyboards, vocals
- Tim Coulter – bass, guitars, vocals, synthesizers
- Evan Railton – drums, percussion, programming, synthesizers

Former

- Josh Cannon – drums, percussion, programming, synthesizers

== Discography ==
- Fort Atlantic (Dualtone Records, 2012)
- Shadow Shaker Vol. 1 (Hot Garbage, 2017)
