= Kasbo =

Swedish electronic music producer and DJ

- Born: Carl Garsbo; October 12, 1995 (age 30); Gothenburg, Sweden
- Genres: chillwave
- Occupations: DJ; Record producer
- Years active: 2013 – present
- Labels: Monstercat; Foreign Family Collective; bitbird
- Website: kasbomusic.com

Carl Garsbo (born 12 October 1995), better known by his stage name Kasbo, is an electronic music producer and DJ, originating from Gothenburg, Sweden. Starting his music career in 2013, he released multiple songs independently and through labels such as Monstercat, Foreign Family Collective and bitbird.

In 2017, he released the singles "Lay It on Me", "Bleed It Out" and "Snow In Gothenburg". When the fourth single, "Aldrig Mer" was released, Kasbo announced his debut album, Places We Don't Know, released on 23 March 2018 through Counter Records and Foreign Family Collective.

== Career ==
=== 2013–2016: Early career ===
Kasbo started in May 2013 with a track "Horizon" (promoted by NCS), followed up by a collaboration in November 2013 with Just a Gent on "Sovereign". His debut song, "Reaching", dropped in May 2014 through Slimkat Records and UKF. The song, "Kaleidoscope", was released in September as his debut through Monstercat, along with "Again" in August. That same month, he collaborated with Father Dude for "Time". Yet, in October, "World Away" was released on ODESZA's label, Foreign Family Collective.

His debut extended play (EP), Umbrella Club EP, was self-released on October 7.

"Call" was the only song released by him in 2016, within November, featuring vocals from Cheney. In December, he was featured on the mix SnowTape Vol. 5, during the SnowGlobe Festival, releasing "ID" as part of the track listing.

=== 2017–present: recognition and Places We Don't Know ===
As an artist, Kasbo started to gain recognition in 2017. In April, featuring guest vocals from Chelsea Cutler, "Found You" was released on San Holo's bitbird and later premiered on Billboard. In 28 June, the Keiynan Lonsdale-featured song "Lay It on Me" premiered on Billboard as the lead single from his then-unannounced debut album. The second single, "Bleed It Out", featured Nea and premiered on 24 October on EDM Sauce.

From October to November 2017, he was one of the openings act for several shows on ODESZA's "A Moment Apart Tour", promoting their third studio album of the same name, along with artists like Sofi Tukker, Hayden James, Chet Porter and Louis Futon. His remix of "Indian Summer" by Jai Wolf was included in the Kindred Spirits Remixes extended play (EP), released simultaneously in November. "Snow In Gothenburg", the third single, was released on 12 December.

On January 18, Kasbo released the fourth single "Aldrig Mer", featuring the British musical duo Tender, and announced his debut album Places We Don't Know, which released on 23 March. The fifth single, "Your Tempo", was released on 13 February and the sixth single, "Over You" was released on 13 March. In March, he collaborated with Shallou and Cody Lovaas for the song, "Find".

From May 2019 to October 2019, Kasbo had paused music production due to severe hearing loss. The diagnosis for such hearing loss is unclear. On 29 October, Kasbo released a new single, "I Get You", which was in collaboration with artist Lizzy Land. Kasbo had released a teaser on his official YouTube channel 6 days prior.

== Discography ==
=== Studio albums ===
- Places We Don't Know (2018)
- The Making of a Paracosm (2020)
- The Learning of Urgency (2024)

=== Singles ===
Title	Year	Ref.
"Sovereign" (with Just a Gent featuring Jon)	2013	
"Reaching"	2014	
"Kaleidoscope"	2014	
"World Away"	2015	
"Again"	2015	
"Time" (with FATHERDUDE)	2015	
"Call" (featuring Cheney)	2016	
"The Little Things"	2016	
"Found You" (featuring Chelsea Cutler)	2017	
"Lay It On Me" (featuring Keiynan Lonsdale)	2017	
"Bleed It Out" (featuring Nea)	2017	
"Snow in Gothenburg"	2017	
"Aldrig Mer (featuring TENDER)"	2018	
"Over You" (featuring Frida Sundemo)	2018	
"Your Tempo"	2018	
"About You"	2018	
"I Get You" (featuring Lizzy Land)	2019	
"Play Pretend" (featuring Ourchives)	2020	
"Show You"	2020	
"Staying In Love / Skogsrå"	2020	
"Lune" (with Vancouver Sleep Clinic)	2020	
"Hemma"	2020	
"Blow The Roof" (with Louis the Child and Evan Giia)	2022	
"The Way You Had Me"	2023	
"Alive"	2023	
"Running In A Dream (with Nils Hoffmann and Vancouver Sleep Clinic)"	2023	
"Atlantis (with Shallou and BJOERN)"	2024	
"Drift"	2024	
"This Is It (with Frida Sundemo)"	2024	
"How Does It Feel (with Jerro)"	2024	
"Resenären"	2024	
"I'm In Trouble"	2024	
"GarraGarra (with DJ Carpenter and Izza Gara)"	2024	
"All This Time"	2026	
"Falling Slow"	2026	

=== Remixes ===
- Local Natives – Ceilings (Kasbo Remix)
- Ed Sheeran – Happier (Kasbo Remix)
- ZHU – Sky is Crying (Kasbo Remix)

- ZHU x AlunaGeorge – Automatic (Kasbo Remix)
- Mutemath – Monument (Kasbo Remix)

- The Temper Trap – Fall Together (Kasbo Remix)
- Fetty Wap – Trap Queen (Kasbo Remix)

- Erik Hassle – No Words (Kasbo Remix)

- Louis Futon – Sir Rock (Kasbo Remix)

- Jai Wolf – Indian Summer (Kasbo Remix)
- Vance Joy – Riptide (Kasbo Remix)
- Big Gigantic – The Little Things ft. Angela McCluskey (Kasbo Remix)
