= Zhu =

Zhu or ZHU may refer to:

- Zhu (surname), common Chinese surnames
- Zhu River, or Pearl River, in southern China
- Zhu (state), ancient Chinese state, later renamed Zou
- House of Zhu, the ruling house of the Ming dynasty in Chinese history
- Zhu (string instrument), ancient Chinese string instrument
- Zhu (percussion instrument), ancient Chinese percussion instrument
- Zhu (musician) (born 1989), American electronic music artist
- Zhuhai Jinwan Airport, ZHU is the 3 letter IATA code for the airport
- Zhu languages
- Houston Air Route Traffic Control Center, known as ZHU
