= SNBRN =

- Born: Kevin Andrew Chapman
- Genres: EDM, future house
- Labels: Atlantic Records, Astralwerks, Sony U.K.
- Website: snbrn.com

Kevin Andrew Chapman, commonly known by his stage name SNBRN, is an American DJ and musician from Los Angeles.

He has accumulated over 47 million plays on SoundCloud per May 2016.

== Biography ==
Kevin Chapman became interested in dance music when he was 12 years old, after discovering music from artists such as Fatboy Slim and Moby. He started producing his own dance music in 2008, after acquiring the digital music software Reason.

In 2013 SNBRN finished several professional degrees in the fields of audio engineering and production. Around this time he decided on his artist name, SNBRN. In May 2014 he released several remixes and covers of songs on the internet under the name SNBRN. After this he gained attention, with several of his songs topping charts on HypeMachine as well as accumulating millions of plays on digital music platforms such as SoundCloud and YouTube. He also got Pete Tong out of BBC Radio 1's support.

Releasing his songs officially through Atlantic Records, Astralwerks and Sony U.K., SNBRN has quickly become an up-and-coming dance and house music artist. His first single, Raindrops, featuring Estonian singer Kerli was released January 20, 2014, via Ultra Records.

In 2015 he released the song "Gangsta Walk" which incorporates previously unreleased vocals by Nate Dogg, licensed through his estate; it has per May 2016 debuted on several charts.

== Style and influences ==
SNBRN labels his own music as "Sunset House" on SoundCloud. According to Lollapalooza, he mixes elements of deep house, indie dance, and nu disco while maintaining its accessibility.
