= Pnuma Trio =

American electronic music group

- Origin: Memphis, Tennessee, U.S.
- Genres: Livetronica; Acid jazz IDM; Blip hop
- Years active: 2004 - present
- Label: 1320 Records
- Spinoffs: Mansions on the Moon
- Members: Alexander Botwin; Ben Hazlegrove; Lane Shaw

The Pnuma Trio was an electronic musical group, bringing classical, jazz, funk, hip hop, and drum and bass influences. A recent article in Art Voice magazine dubbed the Pnuma Trio the "Music of the future."

The Pnuma Trio consists of Alex Botwin on bass guitar, Ben Hazlegrove on keyboards, and Lane Shaw on drums. Hazlegrove received classical training at the Berklee College of Music.

== Career ==
The Pnuma Trio was born in December 2004 and began practicing and performing in Memphis, Tennessee. During their career, Pnuma has toured the United States extensively, and Japan and Australia as well. They were the only American band at 2006's Exodus Festival in Australia. They have shared the stage with bands like Disco Biscuits, STS9, Lotus, Zilla, Michael Franti, The String Cheese Incident, and Buckethead among others.

Throughout the summer of 2007 the band will be heavily touring the festival circuit with stops at Wakarusa, Summer Camp, and 10,000 Lakes Festival, Joshua Tree Music Festival, and Nelson Ledges.

Within the electronic music community, the Pnuma Trio's followers are growing at a steady pace. According to JamBase, "They've become one of the most talked about young bands in the country."

Pnuma Trio has just completed a new studio album entitled Character which was released on Columbia Records Japanese Division on September 25, 2007.

Pnuma Trio had a career-defining performance at St. Elmo Hall at the University of Virginia in April 2007.

The Electric Avenue Music & Arts Festival announced that Pnuma Trio will headline the 3 Night / Day Festival in Denver, CO, Sept 3-5, 2010.

Currently Ben Hazlegrove and Lane Shaw are working on their project Mansions on the Moon, While Alex Botwin produces and tours as Paper Diamond.

== Members ==
- Alex Botwin - bass guitar, programming
- Ben Hazlegrove - keyboards
- Lane Shaw - drums

== Discography ==
- 2006 - Live from Out There
- 2007 - Character
