= Moon Taxi =

American rock band

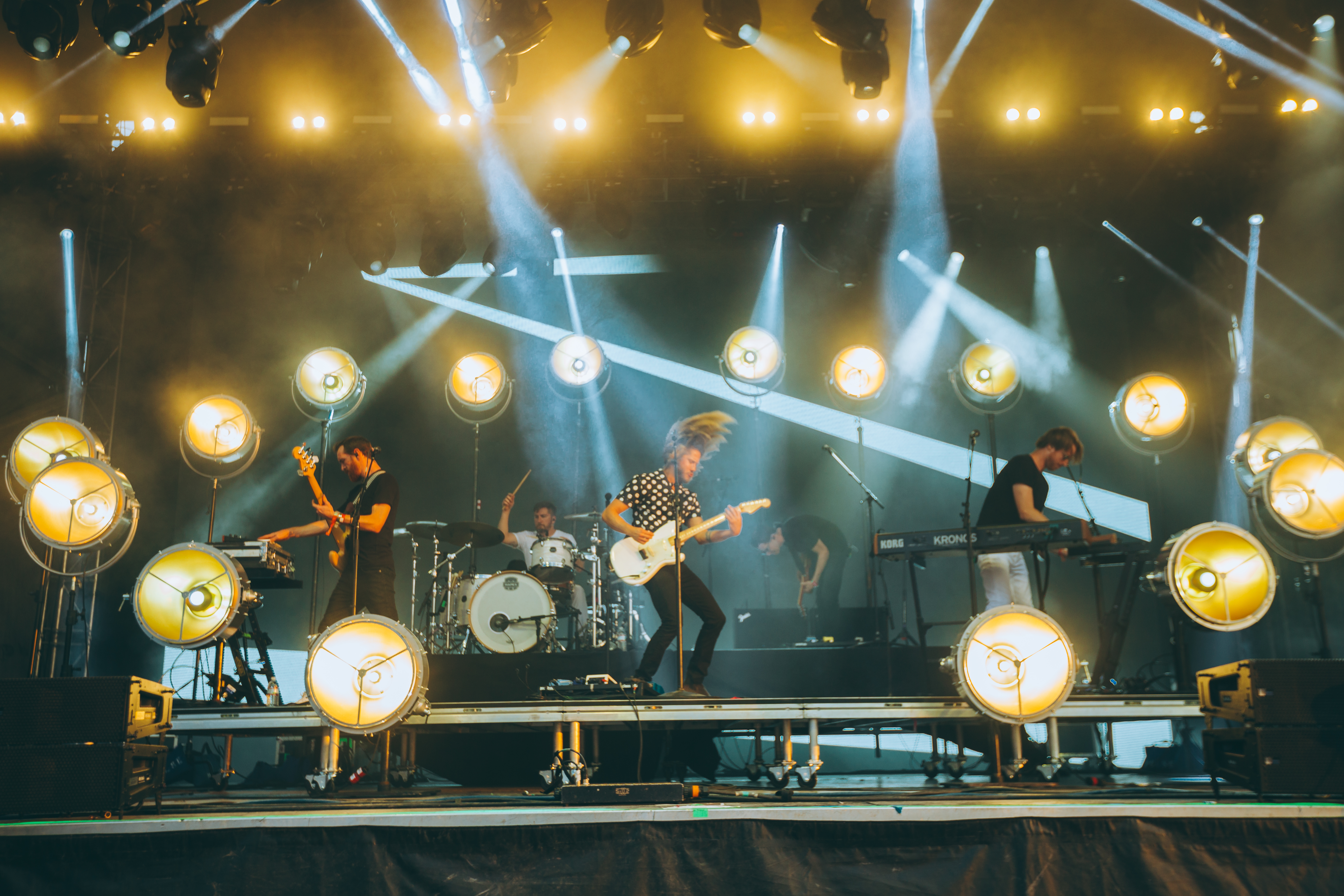
- Moon Taxi performing at Bonnaroo Music Festival in 2018

Background information
- Origin: Nashville, Tennessee, United States
- Genres: Indie rock; alternative rock; jam rock
- Years active: 2006–present
- Labels: 12th South; RCA
- Members: Trevor Terndrup; Spencer Thomson; Tommy Putnam; Wes Bailey; Tyler Ritter
- Website: www.ridethemoontaxi.com

Moon Taxi is an American alternative rock band based in Nashville, Tennessee. The band was founded in 2006 by Trevor Terndrup (vocals, guitar), Tommy Putnam (bass), Spencer Thomson (guitar, programming), Tyler Ritter (drums), and Wes Bailey (keys) while attending Belmont University.

The band has released six studio albums: Melodica, Cabaret, Mountains Beaches Cities, Daybreaker, and Let the Record Play, and Silver Dream. Moon Taxi signed to RCA Records in 2017.

Moon Taxi has appeared on The Late Show with David Letterman, Conan, Late Night with Seth Meyers, and most recently Jimmy Kimmel Live.

The band has been included on the Coachella, Hangout, Forecastle, Beale Street, Summerfest and Firefly music festival bills, using festivals to grow the band's fan base.

== History ==
=== Early days and formation of current line-up ===
Trevor Terndrup and Tommy Putnam attended high school together in Vestavia Hills, a suburb of Birmingham, Alabama, and played in a bluesy rock group known as Apex during their junior and senior years. Upon graduation in 2002, the two moved to Nashville, Tennessee where they met fellow student and guitarist Spencer Thomson, and drummer David Swan, shortly after their arrival at Belmont University. Together with Thomson, a native of Bowling Green, Kentucky, and Swan of Atlanta, Georgia, the quartet jammed in freshman dorm rooms, quickly landing a gig as the backing band for a local rap duo. In the school years following, the group performed sparsely around Nashville and in college towns around the Southeast under the name Moon Taxi.

After Swan graduated from Belmont in 2006, he left the band to pursue a career as a US Army Aviator. Moon Taxi commissioned drummer Tyler Ritter, also of Vestavia Hills, in fall 2006, and the quartet began writing and recording songs for a debut studio release. Keyboardist Wes Bailey, a native of Knoxville, Tennessee, sat in with the band during local shows around the same time, and when Melodica was released in April 2007, Bailey was added as a permanent member, thus completing the current line-up.

=== Melodica and 12th South Records ===
Moon Taxi's debut studio effort, Melodica, was recorded in Nashville at Triple House Productions. The album's material is primarily categorized as jam rock and contains the tracks "Gimme a Light" and "Here to Stay". Terndrup, Putnam, Thomson, and Ritter formed 12th South Records, an independent label housed in their 12th Avenue South home.

=== Live Ride ===
In August 2008, the band recorded a live album, Live Ride, from a performance at 12th and Porter in Nashville. The night featured two sets with nearly 30 songs, both new material and Melodica's.

The release of Live Ride was a precursor to more festival appearances, such as The Hangout Music and Arts Festival (Gulf Shores, Alabama) in 2010 and 2011, Wakarusa in Ozark, Arkansas in 2011, as well as a nationwide tour in 2010 that took the band from Maine to California. The group won the inaugural Music City Mayhem Contest for "Common Ground", which awarded them several songs in brief rotation on Nashville's WRLT Lightning 100.1 FM. Their Hangout Fest performance in 2010 gained them a Best New Jam nod through JamBase.

During their touring schedule in support of Live Ride, Moon Taxi opened for Gov't Mule, Umphrey's McGee, Matisyahu, and The New Mastersounds.

=== Cabaret ===
In 2010, Moon Taxi began writing new material for their second studio LP, Cabaret. The album was recorded at Alex The Great Studios in South Nashville and at See Six Studios, Thomson's home studio. The album was produced primarily by Thomson with the help of Hank Sullivant, a musician/producer from Athens, Georgia, who also sang guest harmony vocals on "Let's Go Back". Cabaret was mixed by Grammy Award-winner Vance Powell (The Raconteurs) at Sputnik Sound in Berry Hill, Tennessee and mastered by Richard Dodd. The track "Square Circles" features a guest appearance by hip-hop artist Matisyahu and rock n roll legend Mclain Reese.

On April 10, 2013, a live performance by Moon Taxi aired on NPR's World Cafe.

=== Mountains Beaches Cities ===
On September 10, 2013, Moon Taxi released its third studio recording, Mountains Beaches Cities, on the band's label, 12th South Records via BMG. The album features 10 unreleased tracks produced by guitarist Spencer Thomson. Mountains Beaches Cities was recorded in Nashville, TN at SonyTree Studios and See Six Studios. The title is an adaption of the band's view of North Carolina's attributes, namely mountains, beaches and cities.

"For their third album, Mountains Beaches Cities, indie rock quintet Moon Taxi explored new landscapes by amping up the speed and turning up the volume," wrote USA Today.

=== Daybreaker ===
On October 2, 2015, Moon Taxi released its fourth studio album, Daybreaker, on the band's label, 12th South Records via BMG. It was produced by Jacquire King, whose credits include albums by James Bay and Kings of Leon.

Rolling Stone noted: "Over the last few years, Nashville's Moon Taxi have worked their way up from Bonnaroo buzz-band to something approaching Kings of Leon country, playing a pleasingly cross-bred rock." All Day All Night was featured in a McDonald's commercial promoting their new 24-hour breakfast menu.

=== Let The Record Play ===
On May 5, 2017, Moon Taxi released the single Two High, which lyrically is "a song about hope," Terndrup told Relix Magazine. "Hope for understanding, hope for acceptance, and hope for our future. We were inspired by the simple and universal peace sign." In September 2017, the band signed with RCA to release their upcoming album. Terndrup also credited the 2017 Women's March as an inspiration for Two High. The song was featured in the 2018 Jeep Compass commercial "Snow." Two High hit number three on the Adult Alternative Songs chart and number one in Triple A airplay.

On November 17, 2017, the band and RCA Records announced a fifth LP to be released on January 19, 2018, Let the Record Play, and also released a single of the same name. The album would be mixed and produced by guitarist Thompson and feature ten tracks. Although the band had been signed to RCA, the album was finished before the signing. On December 20, Moon Taxi announced a "Let The Record Play" tour, playing around the U. S. in February 2018. A separate "Good as Gold" tour happened in fall 2018.

=== Silver Dream ===
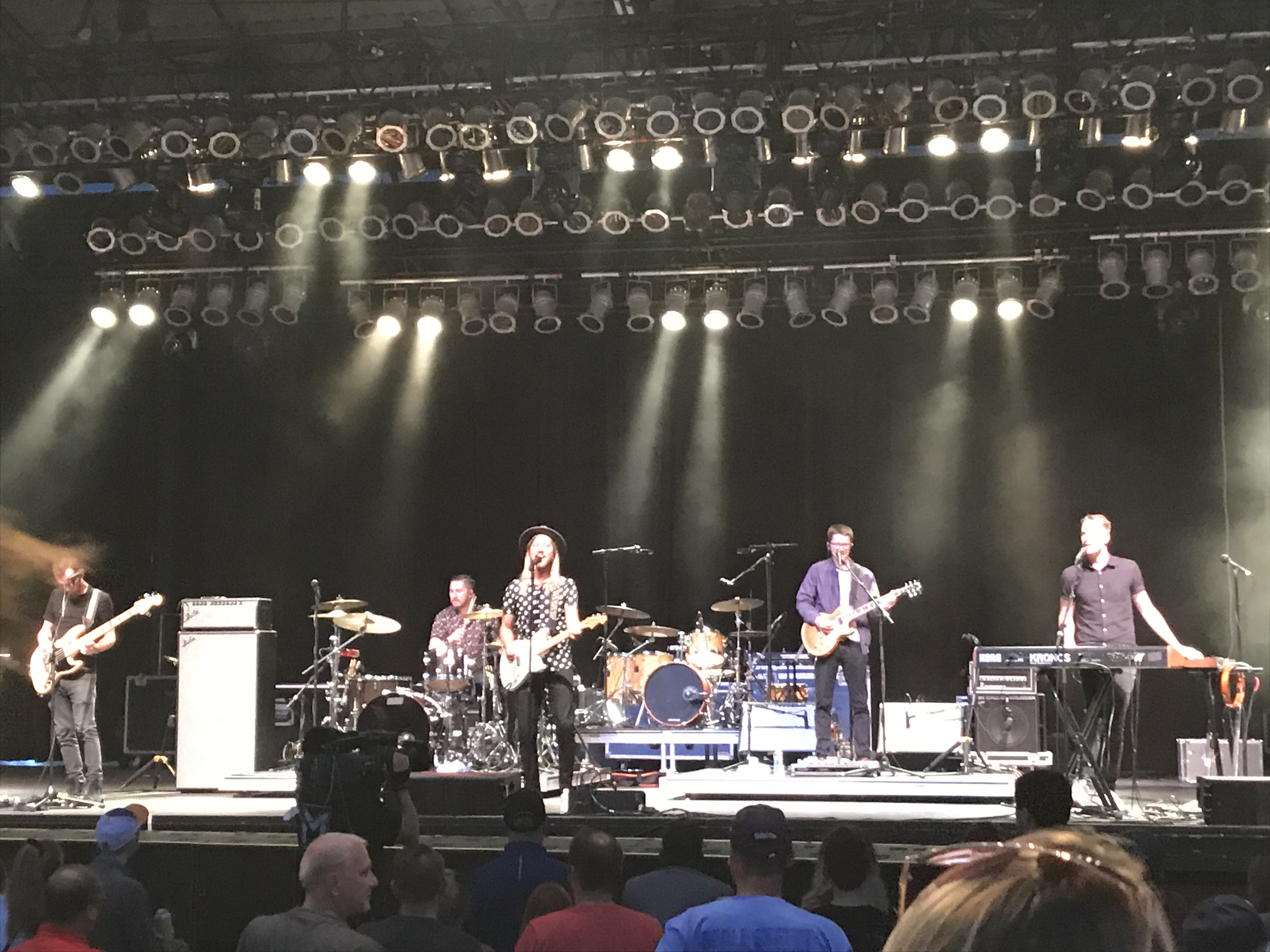
Taxi performing at Summerfest in 2019.

On April 18, 2019, Taxi was announced as the opening act for Day One of the 2019 NFL draft, located in Nashville. A day later, the band released two singles, "Now's the Time" and "This World".

On March 25, 2020, the band released a single, "Hometown Heroes", an electropop influenced song that reflected on the band's journey as a musical group and as a group of friends. Taxi also announced their sixth studio album, Silver Dream, for which Hometown Heroes will be the lead single. On August 21, the band released the second single from Silver Dream, entitled "Light Up". Silver Dream was released on January 22, 2021.

== Discography ==
=== Albums ===
==== Studio albums ====
Title	Details	Peak chart positions		
Title	Details	US Heat	US Indie	US Rock
Melodica	Released: April 19, 2007; Label: 12th South	—	—	—
Live Ride	Released: February 10, 2009; Label: 12th South	—	—	—
Cabaret	Released: February 7, 2012; Label: 12th South	—	—	—
Mountains Beaches Cities	Released: September 10, 2013; Label: 12th South, BMG	14	—	—
Daybreaker	Released: October 2, 2015; Label: 12th South, BMG	2	28	46
Let the Record Play	Released: January 19, 2018; Label: RCA	5	—	—
Silver Dream	Released: January 22, 2021; Label: 12th South, BMG	—	—	—
Set Yourself Free	Released: June 9, 2023; Label: 12th South	—	—	—
"—" denotes a recording that did not chart or was not released in that territory.

==== Live albums ====
Title	Details
New Year's Eve 2015 (Live)	Released: January 1, 2016; Label: 12th South, BMG

=== EPs ===
Title	Details
Acoustic on West 56th	Released: December 17, 2013; Label: 12th South, BMG
Live From Austin	Released: September 5, 2014; Label: Self-released

=== Singles ===
Title	Year	Peak chart positions									Certifications	Album
Title	Year	US AAA	US Alt.	US Rock	CAN Rock	IRE	NOR	SWE	SWI	UK Indie	Certifications	Album
"The New Black"	2013	—	—	—	—	—	—	—	—	—		Mountains Beaches Cities
"River Water"	2013	—	—	—	—	—	—	—	—	—		Mountains Beaches Cities
"Morocco"	2014	—	—	—	—	—	—	—	—	—		Mountains Beaches Cities
"Make Your Mind Up"	2015	—	—	—	—	—	—	—	—	—		Daybreaker
"All Day All Night"	2015	19	—	—	—	—	—	—	—	—		Daybreaker
"Year Zero"	2015	27	—	—	—	—	—	—	—	—		Daybreaker
"Two High"	2017	3	9	26	33	77	32	46	82	9	MC: Gold	Let the Record Play
"Good As Gold"	2018	—	—	—	—	—	—	—	—	—		Let the Record Play
"Not Too Late"	2018	22	—	—	—	—	—	—	—	—		Let the Record Play
"Now's the Time" / "This World"	2019	—	—	—	—	—	—	—	—	—		non-album singles
"Restless"	2019	—	—	—	—	—	—	—	—	—		non-album singles
"Hometown Heroes" (solo or featuring Jimmie Allen)	2020	23	—	—	—	—	—	—	—	—		Silver Dream
"Light Up"	2020	—	—	—	—	—	—	—	—	—		Silver Dream
"One Step Away"	2020	—	—	—	—	—	—	—	—	—		Silver Dream
"The Beginning"	2020	—	—	—	—	—	—	—	—	—		Silver Dream
"Say"	2020	36	—	—	—	—	—	—	—	—		Silver Dream
"Mission"	2021	—	—	—	—	—	—	—	—	—		non-album singles
"Live for It" (Acoustic)	2022	—	—	—	—	—	—	—	—	—		non-album singles
"Evergreen" (featuring Molly Tuttle)	2022	—	—	—	—	—	—	—	—	—		non-album singles
"Classics"	2023	—	—	—	—	—	—	—	—	—		Set Yourself Free
"Set Yourself Free"	2023	—	—	—	—	—	—	—	—	—		Set Yourself Free
"—" denotes a recording that did not chart or was not released in that territory.

=== Other appearances ===
Title	Year	Band	Album
"Thirty-Three"	2026	The Smashing Pumpkins	Sending Hearts To All My Dearies: A Tribute To The Smashing Pumpkins
