= Castlecomer (band) =

Australian musical group

- Origin: Sydney, Australia
- Genres: Indie pop; indie rock; alternative rock; emo
- Years active: 2013–present
- Labels: Concord
- Members: Bede Kennedy; Joe "Neely" Neely; Joe Kennedy; Tommy Kennedy; Pat "Patch" Kennedy
- Website: castlecomermusic.com

Castlecomer is a five-piece Australian rock band formed in the suburbs of Sydney. Named after a small town in Ireland, Castlecomer consists of four cousins who have been making music together since childhood. They released their self-titled debut album on 5 October 2018 on Concord Records.

== History ==
Named after a coal-mining village in Ireland where most of the band's family members emigrated from, Castlecomer has been making music together and touring the festival circuit since 2013. The band is fronted by vocalist Bede Kennedy. He is joined in the band by three cousins (two of whom are brothers), along with close family friend, Neely. All of the band members are classically trained. They have cited Stevie Wonder, Two Door Cinema Club, and M83 as influences, as well as Kendrick Lamar and ABBA, the Strokes, the Beatles, and Carole King. They have been described as delivering "a unique form of alternative guitar pop ready made for huge dance parties and crowd sing-a-longs".

The band built a fanbase in Australia before moving to the United States in 2017 and signing with Concord Records. The band members currently reside in Nashville, where they moved to in early 2018. They put out a series of EPs between 2012 and 2014, but split with their Australian label before ever putting out a full-length album.

In 2017, they played eight shows in three days at SXSW. "Frontman Bede, with a shocking amount of incredible hair that Pantene should get on right away for an advertisement opportunity, bounded around the stage and onto the floor like a madman to their catchy tunes", one reviewer described of their SXSW shows. "You can't help but get drawn into dancing to the infectious beats of their music. Their incredible energy reminds me of Two Door Cinema Club in their early days, which is something even Two Door can't manage to recapture. Delicious escapist fare." They came out of South by Southwest with management, a record deal, publishing, and a booking agent.

As of September 2018, their first official single, "Fire Alarm", had over six million streams on Spotify, reaching the number six position on the streaming service's Global Viral chart.

The band's single "Leaving" has been described as "so innately tranquil and intimate that it feels like you could be in your friend's bedroom, helping him/her reel over a break-up. (It) speaks to heartbreak, feeling helpless and resistant to saying goodbye."

== Tours ==
After spending the summer of 2018 playing U.S. festivals as well as smaller solo shows in the U.S. and Australia, Castlecomer toured the US in October and November 2018 in support of their self-titled debut album.

== Discography ==
Albums

| Title | Details |
|---|---|
| Castlecomer | Released: 5 October 2018 |

EPs

| Title | Year |
|---|---|
| Danny's Den | 2012 |
| Lone Survivor | 2013 |
| Miss December | 2014 |

Singles

| Title | Year | Album |
|---|---|---|
| "The Noise" | 2016 | non-album single |
| "Fire Alarm" | 2016 | Castlecomer |
| "All of the Noise" | 2018 | Castlecomer |
| "Leaving" | 2018 | Castlecomer |
| "Move" | 2018 | Castlecomer |
