= TroyBoi =

British DJ, record producer and musician (born 1987)

- Born: Troy Austin Attoh Henry; 23 November 1987 (age 38); South London, England, United Kingdom
- Genres: Trap; house; bass; future bass; vogue; dubstep
- Years active: 2014–present
- Labels: Mad Decent; Monstercat; Owsla; T Dot Music
- Website: troyboimusic.com

Troy Austin Attoh Henry (born 23 November 1987), known professionally as TroyBoi, is a British DJ, record producer, and musician.

His music combines elements of trap, house, bass, future bass, vogue, and dubstep. His debut album Left is Right was released in 2017, followed by the extended plays, V!bez, Vol. 2 (2018) and V!bez, Vol. 4 (2021).

== Early life ==
Troy Henry was born in South London, England on 23 November 1987 to Anglo Indian mother Connie Henry and his father.

== Musical style and influences ==
TroyBoi's music has been categorised as trap, house, bass, future bass, vogue, and dubstep. There’s also a strong Middle eastern and Indian music influence on his music.

== Discography ==
=== Studio albums ===
List of studio albums, with release date and label shown
Title	Album details
Left is Right	Released: 28 August 2017; Label: T Dot Music; Formats: Digital download, streaming

=== Extended plays ===
List of extended plays, with release date and label shown
Title	Album details
V!bez, Vol. 2	Released: 2018; Label: Formats: Digital download, streaming
V!bez, Vol. 4	Released: 2021; Label: Formats: Digital download, streaming

=== Singles ===
Adapted from Apple Music.

==== As lead artist ====
List of singles, with year released and album name shown
Title	Year	Album
"FYI (Bass Boosted)"	2014	Non-album singles
"Spirits of the Night"	2015	Non-album singles
"Afterhours" (featuring Diplo and Nina Sky)	2015	Non-album singles
"Ouuch"	2015	Non-album singles
"W2L (Welcome to London)"	2015	Non-album singles
"What We Do" (featuring BYP)	2015	Non-album singles
"And Wot?"	2016	Non-album singles
"Hear Dat"	2017	Non-album singles
"Showbiz" (featuring David Stewart)	2017	Non-album singles
"Hooper" (featuring Healthy Chill)	2017	Non-album singles
"What You Know"	2017	Non-album singles
"Never Give Up"	2017	Non-album singles
"X2C'	2017	Non-album singles
"O.G."	2017	Left Is Right
"Ili"	2017	Left Is Right
"Do One"	2018	Non-album singles
"Solid" (with Slumberjack)	2018	Sarawak EP
"Warlordz" (featuring Skrillex)	2019	Non-album singles
"Malokera" (featuring Ludmilla and Ty Dolla $ign)	2019	Non-album singles
"The Truth"	2019	Non-album singles
"Tranquilizer" (featuring Adekunle Gold)	2019	Non-album singles

==== As featured artist ====
List of singles, with year released and album name shown
Title	Year	Album
"Do You?" (featuring Trixvel and TroyBoi)	2021	Non-album single

=== Production discography ===
List of production credits, with year released, artist(s), co-writers, co-producers, and reference shown
Title	Year	Artist(s)	Credits	Co-writer(s)	Co-producer(s)	Album	Ref.
"Lightning"	2015	Little Mix	Co-Writer, Producer	TroyBoi; Jade Thirlwall; Leigh-Anne Pinnock; Jesy Nelson; Perrie Edwards; Maegan Cottone	None	Get Weird	
"Red Eye"	2021	Justin Bieber	Producer	Justin Bieber; Poo Bear; Sasha Sirota; Jimmy Giannos; Dominic "DJ" Jordan	None	Justice	
