= Paper Diamond =

American electronic music producer

Alexander Botwin, better known by his stage name Paper Diamond (formerly Alex B), is an American electronic music producer from Colorado. He signed with Pretty Lights Music in December 2010, and released his first album Levitate on January 25, 2011.

== History ==
Botwin started out as a bassist for the dance music Pnuma Trio in 2004. He then created a record label, design company and store owner under the name Elm & Oak in downtown Boulder, Colorado. After Pnuma Trio, he began his solo career as a DJ under the name Alex B which has become Paper Diamond as of 2011.

After the release of Levitate, his first album, in 2011, he began to play shows and festivals around the country. Starting in 2012 with a US tour that saw him hit the road with The M Machine, he continued on to play the Coachella Valley Music and Arts Festival, a festival that takes place in April in Indio, California. After Coachella he played Electric Forest Festival in Rothbury, Michigan in June 2012. He then played Lollapalooza Music Festival in Chicago, Illinois in early August 2012 before heading to New York City to play Electric Zoo Festival at the end of August 2012 on Randall's Island. He then kicked off his own solo Night Vision Tour 2012 in September by releasing a 30-minute mix entitled "Night Vision Tour Mix 2012". He has also played at Bonnaroo Music Festival in June 2013 in Manchester, Tennessee.

== Style ==
Paper Diamond uses an iPad uploaded with Touch OSC controlling Ableton when doing a live performance.

== Discography ==
=== Albums ===
- 2011: Levitate (Pretty Lights Music Label)
- 2013: Paragon
- 2018: Holograms

=== EPs ===
- 2012: Wavesight
- 2014: Rain Drops

=== Tour Mixes ===
- 2012: Night Vision Tour Mix 2012
- 2014: Cold Crush Tour Mix 2014

=== Remixes ===
- 2011: Hans Zimmer - South of Heaven's Chanting Mermaids Remixed (Paper Diamond Remix)
- 2012: Throw it in the Bag (Keri Hilson + Wiz Khalifa + Paper Diamond Remix)
- 2012: Your Making me High (Paper Diamond Electro Remix)
- 2012: Pretty Boy Swag (Paper Diamond Remix)
- 2012: Same Old Song (Paper Diamond Remix)
- 2014: Diplo - Revolution (Paper Diamond Remix) [ft. Faustix & Imanos and Kai]
