= Firefly Music Festival =

Music festival in Dover, Delaware, US

- Genre: Alternative rock, indie rock, EDM
- Locations: The Woodlands of Dover Motor Speedway (Dover, Delaware)
- Years active: 2012–2019, 2021–2022
- Website: fireflyfestival.com

Firefly Music Festival was a music festival produced by AEG Presents that was first held on July 20–22, 2012, in Dover, Delaware. Firefly took place in The Woodlands of Dover Motor Speedway, a 105-acre (42 ha) festival ground, over the span of four days. Many nationally known musical acts have performed at the festival, with over 100 performances held over the course of the festival in 2016. The festival producers had worked together to establish the event at the current venue with the hopes of having "an open-air festival on the East Coast with plenty of outdoor camping". In past years, the festival has included up to seven stages: The Porch Stage, The Lawn Stage, The Backyard Stage, the Treehouse, The Coffee House, The Pavilion and The Firefly Stage. In 2019, the festival had six main stages (The Firefly Stage, The Prism, The Lawn, The Hideaway, Treehouse and The Roost), two sponsor stages (Bud Light Dive Bar and Toyota Music Den), and one stage in each camping hub (North Hub Beach Club and South Hub). Firefly offered three different pass options; general admission, VIP, and Super VIP.

The festival was held from 2012 through 2022 (the 2020 edition was canceled due to the COVID-19 pandemic). It went on hiatus in 2023; however, it was announced by its promoters that it would return in 2024. On February 29, 2024, Firefly’s promoters announced via social media that the festival “will not return in 2024.”

== Musical acts ==
=== 2012 ===
The headliners for the 2012 festival included Jack White, The Killers, and The Black Keys. Each performer played as the final act for a separate night of the festival on The Firefly Stage, the largest stage at the event. Other notable acts included Death Cab for Cutie, John Legend, Bassnectar, Modest Mouse, and The Flaming Lips. Although Passion Pit was listed as a musical act for 2012, their performance was canceled due to lead singer Michael Angelakos seeking ongoing treatment for bipolar disorder. Yeasayer was chosen as the replacement for Passion Pit's performance.

The 2012 schedule (artists listed from earliest to latest set times):

- Friday, July 20

- Firefly Main Stage: The Wallflowers, John Legend, Jack White
- The Lawn: Heartless Bastards, OK Go, Bassnectar
- The Backyard: Blind Pilot, Mayer Hawthorne & the County, Silversun Pickups Julian Casablancas
- The Porch: Turf War, Matt Costa, Walk the Moon

- Saturday, July 21

- Firefly Main Stage: The Felice Brothers, Michael Franti & Spearhead, Young the Giant, Modest Mouse, The Killers
- The Lawn: Ra Ra Riot, Poliça, Grouplove, Cake, Yeasayer
- The Backyard: Imagine Dragons, Charles Bradley and His Extraordinaries, The Knocks, Chiddy Bang, Lupe Fiasco
- The Porch: Moon Taxi, Kids These Days, Cults, Graffiti6, Trampled by Turtles

- Sunday, July 22

- Firefly Main Stage: The Head and the Heart, Cold War Kids, Death Cab for Cutie, The Black Keys
- The Lawn: Penguin Prison, Awolnation, Fitz and the Tantrums, The Flaming Lips
- The Backyard: J Roddy Walston and the Business, Bombay Bicycle Club, Tinie Tempah, Girl Talk
- The Porch: Lower Case Blues, Reptar, Mariachi El Bronx, Allen Stone

=== 2013 ===
The headliners for the 2013 festival included Red Hot Chili Peppers, and Tom Petty and the Heartbreakers. Other notable acts included Vampire Weekend, Foster the People, Yeah Yeah Yeahs, The Avett Brothers, Calvin Harris, and Passion Pit.

Imagine Dragons was scheduled to be the only returning musical act between the 2012 and 2013 Firefly Music Festival. However, due to a scheduling conflict they had to cancel their performance and were replaced by Jim James. The Lumineers and Earl Sweatshirt were also scheduled to perform, but cancelled for medical reasons. Ben Harper and Charlie Musselwhite replaced The Lumineers while Schoolboy Q replaced Earl Sweatshirt in the lineup.

The 2013 schedule (artists listed from earliest to latest set times):

- Friday, June 21

- Firefly Main Stage: The Neighbourhood, Django Django, Dr. Dog, The Avett Brothers, Red Hot Chili Peppers
- The Lawn: Leagues, Wild Belle, Atlas Genius, Ellie Goulding, Calvin Harris
- The Backyard: JC Brooks & the Uptown Sound, Sister Sparrow & the Dirty Birds, Twenty One Pilots, The Joy Formidable, Public Enemy, Grizzly Bear, Krewella
- The Porch: The Spinto Band, Conner Youngblood, Action Bronson, Foxygen, Dragonette, Schoolboy Q, Dan Deacon

- Saturday, June 22

- Firefly Main Stage: Japandroids, Jim James, Alabama Shakes, Yeah Yeah Yeahs, Tom Petty and the Heartbreakers
- The Lawn: Kopecky Family Band, ZZ Ward, Kendrick Lamar, Edward Sharpe and the Magnetic Zeros, MGMT
- The Backyard: Young Empires, Blondfire, He's My Brother She's My Sister, A Silent Film, Chvrches, Youngblood Hawke, Azealia Banks, Big Gigantic
- The Porch: Imaginary Cities, Hey Marseilles, St. Lucia, Lord Huron, Crystal Fighters, Manufactured Superstars, The White Panda

- Sunday, June 23

- Firefly Main Stage: The Chevin, LP, Ben Harper and Charlie Musselwhite, Passion Pit, Foster the People
- The Lawn: Selah Sue, Haim, Matt & Kim, Dispatch, Vampire Weekend
- The Backyard: Delta Rae, The Apache Relay, The Last Bison, Kishi Bashi, Capital Cities, The Walkmen, Zedd
- The Porch: The Last Royals, Trails and Ways, Wheeler Brothers, Robert DeLong, Toro y Moi, Amanda Palmer and the Grand Theft Orchestra

=== 2014 ===
On January 14, 2014, the lineup for 2014 was announced via the official Firefly YouTube channel. The headliners for 2014 included Outkast, Foo Fighters, and Jack Johnson with other notable acts Imagine Dragons, Beck, The Lumineers, Pretty Lights, Arctic Monkeys, Weezer and Broken Bells. Girl Talk, Twenty One Pilots, and Imagine Dragons returned for their second year performing at the festival.

The 2014 schedule (artists listed from earliest to latest set times):

- Thursday, June 19

- The Backyard: Andrew Belle, Kodaline, Phosphorescent, Local Natives
- The Lawn: Parade of Lights, Courtney Barnett, Amos Lee
- The Forest: John & Jacob, Aer, Gregory Alan Isakov, San Fermin, RAC

- Friday, June 20

- Firefly Main Stage: Kongos, Bleachers, Iron and Wine, Arctic Monkeys, Foo Fighters
- The Backyard: Hunter Hunted, Ghost Beach, Sky Ferreira, Portugal. The Man, Young the Giant, Girl Talk
- The Lawn: Basic Vacation, New Politics, American Authors, Chance the Rapper, Band of Horses
- The Porch: The Secret Sisters, Vic Mensa, The Mowgli's, The Airborne Toxic Event, A-Trak, White Denim, Cash Cash
- The Forest: Magic Man, Bronze Radio Return, Shakey Graves, The Jezabels, Son Lux
- The Coffee House: Lily Mae, Cruiser, Courrier, Gregory Alan Isakov, High Highs, American Authors, Iron and Wine
- The Big Break: Mean Lady, Saints of Valory, Step Rockets, Christian Porter

- Saturday, June 21

- Firefly Main Stage: Twenty One Pilots, Third Eye Blind, Grouplove, Imagine Dragons, Outkast
- The Backyard: Bad Things, Smallpools, MS MR, Cage the Elephant, Tegan and Sara, Pretty Lights
- The Lawn: The Ceremonies, Geographer, Lucius, Kaiser Chiefs, Tune-Yards, Beck
- The Porch: Unlikely Candidates, Royal Teeth, Goldroom, Walk off the Earth, Sleigh Bells, The White Panda
- The Forest: The Weeks, The Wild Feathers, Wild Child, Boy & Bear, Johnnyswim, X Ambassadors
- The Coffee House: Wheeland Brothers, Speak, The Colourist, The Wild Feathers, Smallpools, Grouplove
- The Big Break: New Sweden, Holychild, Kite String Tangle, Sleeper Agent, Stop Light Observations

- Sunday, June 22

- Firefly Main Stage: Dan Croll, City and Colour, Weezer, The Lumineers, Jack Johnson
- The Backyard: Nonono, Jake Bugg, Ziggy Marley, Phantogram, Big Gigantic
- The Lawn: Vance Joy, The Colourist, A Great Big World, Washed Out, Broken Bells, Childish Gambino
- The Porch: Little Comets, Wild Cub, G-Eazy, Martin Garrix
- The Forest: MisterWives, Haerts, Sir Sly, Cherub
- The Coffee House: Casey Alvarez, Kawehi, Caroline Glaser, MisterWives, Jake Bugg
- The Big Break: The Griswolds, Gemini Club, Little Daylight, Breach the Summit

=== 2015 ===
On February 17, 2015, the 2015 lineup was announced via the official Firefly YouTube channel. The headliners for 2015 included Paul McCartney, Kings of Leon and The Killers. The schedule of performances and locations were released on a date closer to the festival. Due to a severe thunderstorm on Saturday night of the 2015 festival, Kings of Leon had to cancel their performance and the festival grounds were temporarily evacuated. Charli XCX also had to cancel her Thursday performance, citing "personal reasons" in a statement.

The 2015 schedule (artists listed from earliest to latest set times):

- Thursday, June 18

- The Lawn: Young Rising Sons, Panama Wedding, Ryn Weaver, Jungle, The Kooks
- The Backyard: Cypher Clique, Hey Rosetta!, Grizfolk, Twin Peaks, X Ambassadors
- The Pavilion: Jack Novak, Kill Them with Colour, Nick Catchdubs, Solidisco, Sweater Beats, Tycho
- The Coffee House: Josh Noren, Young Rising Sons, Grizfolk

- Friday, June 19

- Firefly Main Stage: Clean Bandit, Manchester Orchestra, Cage the Elephant, Morrissey, Paul McCartney
- The Lawn: The Hunts, Knox Hamilton, Echosmith, Walk the Moon, Awolnation, Modest Mouse
- The Backyard: Phoebe Ryan, Leif, Logic, Sylvan Esso, Big Data, Kygo, Zedd
- The Pavilion: Styles & Complete, Eau Claire, Craze, Goshfather & Jinco, DJ Mustard, Odesza, Run the Jewels, How to Dress Well
- The Porch: Wild Party, Wolf Alice, Colony House, Bear Hands, Chiddy Bang
- The Forest: Fiancé, Cheerleader, Mother Mother, Captain Kidd, Glass Animals, Marian Hill
- The Coffee House: Stetson Rose, Falls, Cody Simpson, Cheerleader, Manchester Orchestra, Echosmith

- Saturday, June 20

- Firefly Main Stage: Andrew McMahon, Gary Clark Jr., Matt & Kim, Foster the People
- The Lawn: Joe Pug, Milo Greene, Zella Day, Sturgill Simpson, Spoon, Sublime with Rome
- The Backyard: Intergalactix, The Griswolds, Jon Bellion, Betty Who, Dirty Heads, Kid Cudi, Steve Aoki
- The Pavilion: Vindata, Manila Killa, Whyel, SNBRN, Jayceeoh, Alison Wonderland, The Chainsmokers, Matoma, Rustie
- The Porch: Broncho, Skylar Spence, Halsey, Elliphant, Vacationer
- The Forest: Kingsize, Lizzo, Night Terrors of 1927, Zola Jesus, Wind and the Wave, Lettuce
- The Coffee House: Knox Hamilton, Phoebe Ryan, Andrew McMahon, CRUISR, Joe Pug, Betty Who, Milo Greene

- Sunday, June 21

- Firefly Main Stage: Cathedrals, Cold War Kids, Bastille, The Killers
- The Lawn: Client Liaison, Generationals, Bahamas, Hozier, Snoop Dogg
- The Backyard: Cardiknox, Max Frost, Steve Aoki, Benjamin Booker, Broods, Empire of the Sun, The White Panda
- The Pavilion: Filibusta, Shaun Frank, Snakehips, Dizzy Wright, RJD2, Tove Lo, The Chainsmokers
- The Porch: Børns, Vérité, Bad Suns, Citizen Cope
- The Forest: Prinze George, Falls, Phox, Raury
- The Coffee House: Jeffrey James, Max Frost, Børns, Bahamas, Broods

=== 2016 ===
The 2016 lineup was released on November 18, 2015. Headliners included Mumford & Sons, Kings of Leon, Florence and the Machine, and deadmau5. Two Door Cinema Club served as the Thursday night headliner.

The official alphabetical 2016 lineup was as follows:

- ASAP Rocky
- AlunaGeorge
- AMFMS
- Arkells
- Atlas Genius
- Blink-182
- BOT
- Boy & Bear
- Chvrches
- Catfish and the Bottlemen
- Caverns
- Chairlift
- Cheat Codes
- Circa Waves
- City of the Sun
- Civil Twilight
- Cleopold
- Cobi
- Coin
- Coleman Hell
- Connell Cruise
- DRAM
- Deadmau5
- Death Cab For Cutie
- Dirty Dishes
- Disclosure
- Earth, Wind & Fire
- Elle King
- Ellie Goulding
- Elliot Root
- Felix Jaehn
- Fetty Wap
- Finish Ticket
- Fitz and the Tantrums
- Flogging Molly
- Florence and the Machine
- Gallant
- Generik
- Gibbz
- Gnash
- GoldLink
- Grouplove
- Guster
- Hayden James
- Heydaze
- Hippie Sabotage
- Hollis Brown
- Isaac Gracie
- Jack Garratt
- Jahkoy
- Jai Wolf
- James Hersey
- Jeremy Loops
- Kaleo (they never performed at the festival; just on lineup)
- Kaneholler
- Kings of Leon
- Kittens
- LANY
- Laura Stevenson
- Lauv
- Louis the Child
- Ludacris
- M83
- Mail the Horse
- Major and the Monbacks
- Major Lazer
- Marc Scibilia
- Mike Rocket
- Moon Taxi
- Motel Radio
- Mumford & Sons
- MØ
- Nathaniel Rateliff & The Night Sweats
- New Sound Brass Band
- Night Riots
- Noah Gundersen
- Of Monsters and Men
- Oh Wonder
- Parson James
- Pell
- Pepper
- Porter Robinson
- Powers
- PVRIS
- Quilt
- Robert DeLong
- Rüfüs Du Sol
- Saint Motel
- Sam James
- Sigala
- Skizzy Mars
- Slaptop
- Son Little
- St. Lucia
- Strangers You Know
- Sun Club
- Swim Deep
- Tame Impala
- Tchami
- Teen Men
- The 1975
- The Lonely Biscuits
- The Moth and the Flame (added to lineup late)
- The Neighbourhood
- The Shelters
- The Staves
- The Struts
- The White Panda
- The Wombats
- Transviolet
- Trombone Shorty & Orleans Avenue
- Twin Limb
- Two Door Cinema Club
- Tyler Boone
- Vanic
- Vince Staples
- Weathers
- Wet
- Whilk & Misky
- William Bolton

=== 2017 ===
Headliners included The Weeknd, Muse, Twenty One Pilots, Chance the Rapper and Bob Dylan. Glass Animals served as the Thursday night headliner.

The official alphabetized 2017 lineup was as follows:

- *repeat repeat
- 888
- AFI
- Alan Walker
- Alex Wiley
- Andy Frasco & the U.N.
- Animal Years
- Anna Lunoe
- Anna Shoemaker
- Arizona
- Armani Lee
- Astro 8000
- Ayokay
- Banks
- Barns Courtney
- Bencoolen
- Benny Benassi
- Big Wild
- Bishop Briggs
- Bleachers
- Blossoms
- Bob Dylan and His Band
- Bob Moses
- Busta Rhymes
- Capital Cities
- Carverton
- Cashmere Cat
- Chance The Rapper
- Chill Moody
- Cold Roses
- Crywolf
- CVBZ
- Daya
- Dead Man Fall
- Deal Casino
- Dillon Francis
- DJ Jazzy Jeff
- Dreamers
- Dude Ranch & The Girl at the Rock Show
- Eden
- Elohim
- Fickle Friends
- Fletcher
- Flume
- Foreign Air
- Francis & The Lights
- Franz Ferdinand
- Future Generations
- Galantis
- Glass Animals
- Goody Grace
- Gryffin
- Hamilton Leithauser
- Hamish Anderson
- Handsome Ghost
- Hardwork Movement
- HDBEENDOPE
- Illenium
- Ill Fated Natives
- Jacob Banks
- James TW
- Jared & The Mill
- Joie Kathos
- Jonas Blue
- Judah & the Lion
- K.Flay
- Kaiydo
- Kaleo
- Kesha
- Kevin Garrett
- Lawrence
- Lewis Del Mar
- Lil Dicky
- Louie Louie
- Luke O'Brien
- Maggie Rogers (singer)
- MAGIC GIANT
- Matoma
- Meg Mac
- Michael Blume
- Miike Snow
- Miles Chancellor
- Mir Fontane
- Misterwives
- Mondo Cozmo
- Muna
- MUSE
- Nahko and Medicine for the People
- NAWAS
- New Madrid
- NF (rapper)
- O.A.R.
- OddKidOut
- OK GO
- OWEL
- Pardison Fontaine
- Phantogram
- Quinn XCII
- Quitehype
- Rainbow Kitten Surprise
- Roadkill Ghost Choir
- Rozes
- Saint Wknd
- Salt Cathedral
- Sam Feldt
- Savoir Adore
- Secret Weapons
- Shaed
- Shizz Lo
- Short Sleeve Heart
- Sir Sly
- Sir The Baptist
- Slushii
- Snakehips
- Sofi Tukker
- Spiritual Rez
- Steve James
- Stick Figure
- Sub-Radio
- Sunflower Bean
- T-Pain
- Taylor Bennett
- The Lawsuits
- The Naked and Famous
- The Orphan The Poet
- The Shins
- The Social Animals
- The Steppin Stones
- The Strumbellas
- The Weeknd
- The White Panda
- Thirty Seconds To Mars
- Tory Lanez
- Trio
- Twenty One Pilots
- Vita and the Woolf
- Wale
- Walker Lukens
- Warm Brew
- Weezer
- Wilderado
- Win and Woo
- Young Bombs

=== 2018 ===
The 2018 Firefly Music Festival continued the four-day event format from June 14 through June 17 with headliners that included: Eminem, Kendrick Lamar, Arctic Monkeys, The Killers, ODESZA, Lil Wayne, Logic, SZA, Martin Garrix, and Alt-J.

=== 2019 ===
The 2019 Firefly Music Festival returned a three-day event format starting June 21 and lasting through June 23 with headliners that included: Panic! at the Disco, Travis Scott, and Post Malone. Other major performers included Kygo, Tyler the Creator, Vampire Weekend, DJ Snake, ZEDD, Death Cab for Cutie, Brockhampton, Courtney Barnett, TLC, Lykke Li, Lauren Daigle, Alison Wonderland, King Princess, Jessie Reyez, and Tank and the Bangas.

=== 2020 ===
The 2020 Firefly Music Festival was scheduled to be held from June 18 to 21 with the headliners Rage Against the Machine, Billie Eilish, and Halsey. Other performers announced were Khalid, Blink-182, Maggie Rogers, Cage the Elephant, Illenium, Diplo, and Run the Jewels. The 2020 iteration of the festival was canceled on March 24 due to the COVID-19 pandemic.

=== 2021 ===
The 2021 Firefly Music Festival was announced on March 29, 2021, to be held from September 23 to 26. Headliners included Billie Eilish, The Killers, Tame Impala, and Lizzo. Additional major performers included Megan Thee Stallion, Cage the Elephant, Roddy Ricch, Wiz Khalifa, Machine Gun Kelly, Diplo, Glass Animals, Portugal. The Man, Sylvan Esso, and Khruangbin.

=== 2022 ===
The 2022 Firefly Music Festival took place September 22-25, 2022 with the headliners Halsey, My Chemical Romance, Green Day, and Dua Lipa. Additional major performers included Weezer, The Kid Laroi, Big Sean, Zedd, Porter Robinson, Gunna, Avril Lavigne, Jamie XX, Gryffin, Charli XCX, Bleachers, Rainbow Kitten Surprise, The Head and the Heart, Jungle, All Time Low, Manchester Orchestra, Cold War Kids, and 100 Gecs.

=== 2023 - 2025 ===
In October of 2022, one month after the conclusion of the 2022 edition of Firefly Music Festival, festival organizers announced that the festival would not be held in 2023, but indicated it will return in 2024.

In February 2024, festival organizers announced that the festival would not return for the second straight year.

As of May 2025, no plans have been announced for future editions of Firefly.

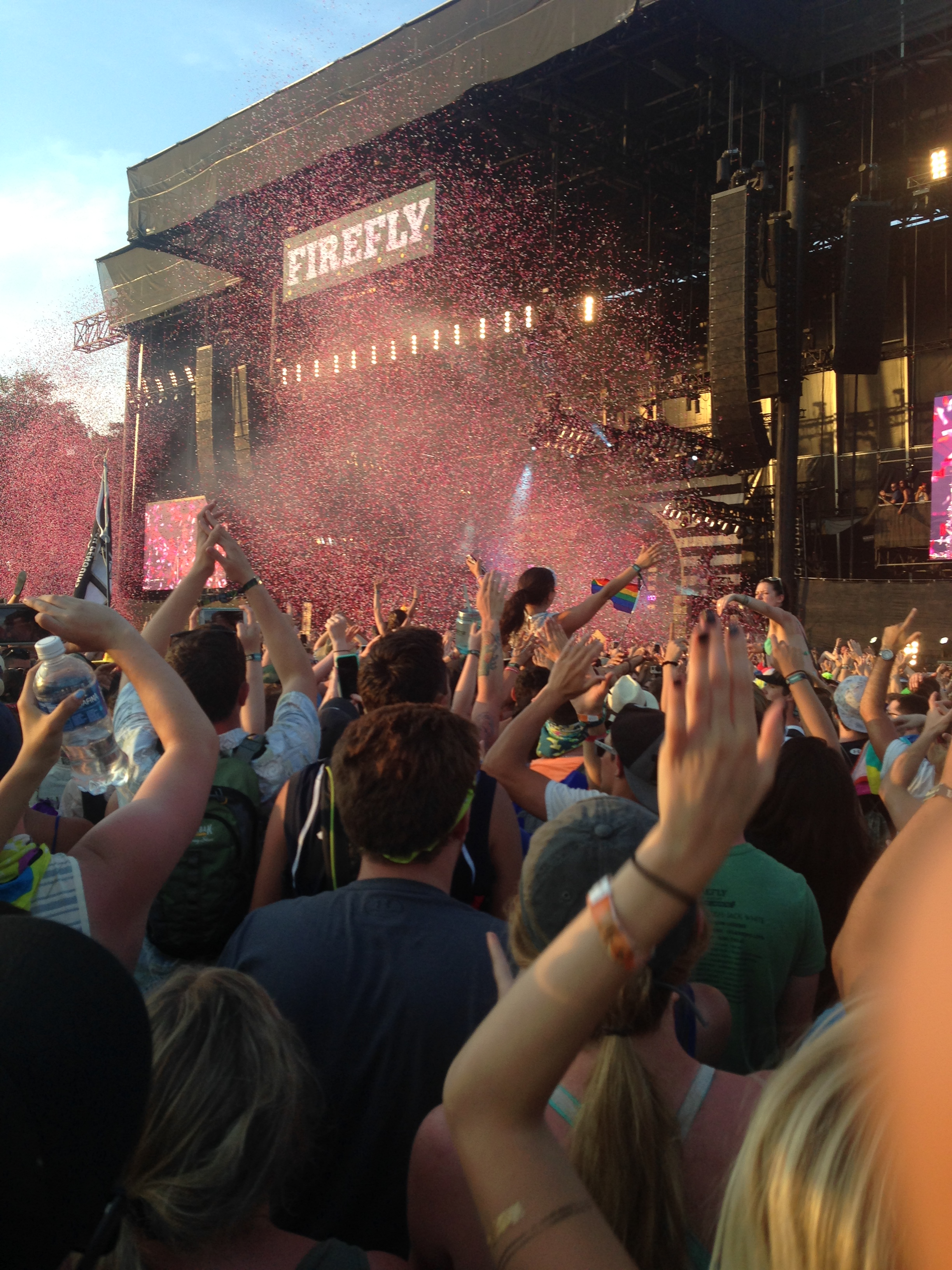
Crowd surfing at the finale of a Blink-182 concert

== Activities ==
In addition to musical acts, the Firefly Music Festival offered other activities. An arcade tent would be set up, housing arcade and video games. Attendees were able to design their own pair of Toms Shoes and have an artist paint the design. With the purchase of the custom pair of shoes, an additional pair of Toms was sent to a child in need, through the Toms One For One Movement program. The Hammock Hangout was a shaded area allowing attendees to sit or lay down in a hammock. The Pathway was a wooded path connecting the two "halves" of the festival. Each year, the Pathway had a theme, and as of the 2017 festival, fans got to choose what that happens to be.

At the Thicket, attendees were able to participate in a silent rave using headphones to listen to music played by DJs. The Coffee House offered a multiple café-style vendors, and music performances throughout the day.

In its first year, Firefly featured tethered hot air balloon rides over the Woodlands.
