= Separation Day =

Separation Day refers to different holidays celebrating a territory or country's separation:

- Separation Day (Delaware), the 1776 separation of Delaware from Pennsylvania
- Separation of Queensland, the 1859 separation of Queensland from New South Wales
- Secession of Panama from Colombia, the 1903 separation of Panama from Colombia
