= Rebel Heart (disambiguation) =

Rebel Heart is a 2015 album released by American singer Madonna.

Rebel Heart or Rebel Hearts may also refer to:

== Music ==
- Rebel Heart Tour, a 2015–2016 tour in support of the Madonna album
- Rebel Heart (Dan Seals album), 1983
- Rebel Heart Tour (album), a 2017 live album of the Madonna tour
- "Rebel Heart" (instrumental), an instrumental by The Corrs (2000)
- "Rebel Heart" (Madonna song) (2015)
- "Rebel Heart" (Ive song) (2025)
- "Rebel Heart", a song by Rod Stewart from Vagabond Heart (1991)
- "Rebel Heart", a song by Kane Roberts from Saints and Sinners (1991)
- "Rebel Heart", a song by Roots Manuva from Awfully Deep (2005)
- "Rebel Heart", a song by The Shelters from their self-titled debut album (2016)
- "Rebel Heart", a song by Lauren Daigle from Look Up Child (2018)
- "Rebel Hearts", an Irish rebel song
- "Rebel Hearts", a song by Hilary Duff from Breathe In. Breathe Out. (2015)
- "Rebel Heart", a song by First Aid Kit from Ruins (2018)

== Other uses ==
- Rebel Heart (TV series), a 2001 BBC drama miniseries set during the Irish War of Independence from 1916
- Rebel Heart, autobiography of Bebe Buell 2002
- Rebel Heart, a 2012 teen novel by Moira Young
- AEW Rebel Heart, a 2026 professional wrestling event
