= Hamish Anderson =

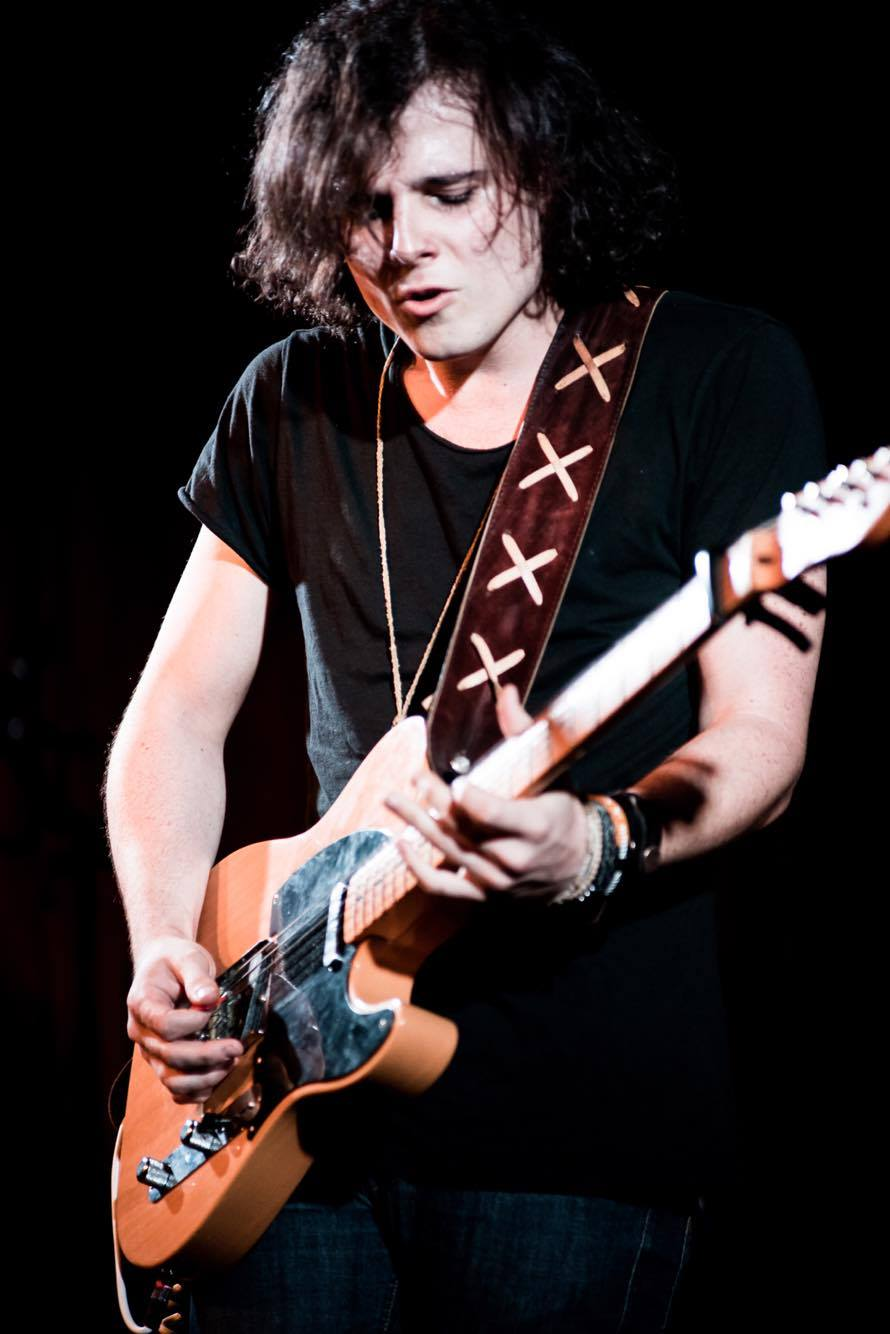

Background information
- Origin: Australia
- Genres: Blues, Blues rock, Rock and roll, Americana, Folk
- Occupations: Guitarist, songwriter, singer
- Instrument: Guitar
- Years active: 2013–present
- Website: Official website

Hamish Anderson is an Australian blues rock guitarist, songwriter and singer. He has shared the stage with B.B. King. He has released two EPs. His debut album Trouble was released on 21 October 2016. He was the last person to open a show for B.B. King before he died. In December 2016, Hamish was named as one of the 10 Best New Artists of 2016 by Yahoo! Music.

== Early life ==
Hamish Anderson grew up in Melbourne, Australia. He started learning guitar at the age of 12. At the age of 17, he started singing and songwriting. Anderson left his home town in Melbourne in 2014 to further his musical career in America.

== Career ==
Anderson is a blues rock guitarist-singer-songwriter. In April 2013 he released a debut single, "Howl", which was taken from his self-titled extended play. The five-track EP was recorded at BJB Studio in Sydney with Eric J. Dubowsky (Art vs. Science, Weezer, Bluejuice) producing. "Howl" featured Rami Jaffee of the Foo Fighters. It was described as "encompasses a mix of blues, rock and folk with moments of loud, electric blues-soaked chords as well as delicate acoustic balladry, Hamish comes armed with a host of noteworthy tunes and a songwriting and vocal maturity well beyond his twenty-one years." The EP was released in November 2013. Anderson was the last artist to open for the late B.B. King.

In spring 2016 he completed a 12-city tour opening for The Rides (featuring Stephen Stills, Kenny Wayne Shepherd and Barry Goldberg). In addition to these tours, he's performed over sixty shows in the US including eleven showcases during SXSW during 2017; as well as Vintage Trouble, Robert Cray, Los Lobos, Kenny Wayne Shepherd, Wynonna Judd and Blues Traveler.

Anderson's second EP, Restless was released in October 2014. Restless was recorded live in L.A. with Krish Sharma (Rolling Stones). It features Grammy-winning floor steel guitarist Greg Leisz (Eric Clapton, Bruce Springsteen) and Matt Johnson (Jeff Buckley) on drums.

In 2015, he received an award for Best Blues Song by the Independent Music Awards for his single "Burn" and was profiled in Huffington Post 'Beyond the Six Strings' as well as The Blues Magazine UK for their Future of Blues Music issue.

His debut album, Trouble, was produced by Grammy Award-winning producer/mixer Jim Scott (Tom Petty, Tedeschi Trucks, Ryan Bingham, Wilco, Grace Potter), and features Steve Berlin from Los Lobos on baritone sax; Johnny Radelat (Gary Clark Jr), Freddie Bokkenheuser (Ryan Adams), and Aaron Sterling (John Mayer) on drums; Chris Bruce (Seal, Meshell Ndegeocello) and Rob Calder (Angus & Julia Stone, Kanye) on bass; Chris Joyner (Ryan Bingham) and Jerry Borge (Jonathan Wilson) on keys.

Guitarist Gary Clark Jr. has cited Hamish Anderson as a young act under 30 to watch out for. The first single from that album, also titled Trouble, has received more than 1500 spins on major market AAA radio across the nation since its release on 15 April. It was featured on Spotify’s official "Blues & Roots Rock" playlist. The official video had an exclusive premiere on Relix.com. Hamish’s second single, Hold On Me was released 16 September and the debut album, Trouble, released 21 October.

Hamish toured the US and Canada festivals in 2017, including performances at Firefly Music Festival, Mountain Jam (festival), Summerfest, Ottawa Bluesfest, Big Blues Bender, Telluride Blues & Brews Festival and Tom Tom Founders Fest.

In 2017, Hamish was also added to Taco Bell's Feed the Beat Roster. In November, "U" was named one of the Top 5 tracks of the week on KCRW's Morning Becomes Eclectic and a "Best of Week" on Apple Music Australia & Japan, and was also profiled on NPR Music’s "Heavy Rotation".

On 20 July 2018, Anderson released "No Good2", a single from his upcoming second studio album, Out Of My Head, with Relix. The official music video premiered on Billboard

In April 2019, Anderson toured Australia opening for Gary Clark Jr. where he joined Gary on stage every night for the encore. This was in support of Anderson's full length album release, Out Of My Head, on 3 May 2019. On 5 May, Anderson performed at the Beale Street Music Festival. Shortly after, he released an official music video for Breaking Down (30 May 2019) and performed on DittyTV, which aired on 9 June. Later in the year, Anderson opened for The Shelters at Moroccan Lounge, was a featured artist on a YouTube Live Fender Play video teaching the guitar stylings of The Who, and released a video for his single, What You Do To Me. Anderson spent the fall of 2019 headlining his first tour of Europe and closed out the year with a live performance of 3 songs off of Out Of My Head and an interview on KCSN.

In 2020, Out of My Head was awarded an Independent Music Award for Best Album - Blues.

Anderson recorded an acoustic version of his single "Morning Light" for Acoustic Guitar magazine's Acoustic Guitar Sessions in Place series.

== Discography ==
EPs

- Self Titled (2013)
- Restless (2014)

Album

- Trouble (2016)
- Out Of My Head (2019)
- Electric (2024)

Music Videos

- "Little Lies" (2015)
- "My Sweetheart You" (2015)
- "Trouble" (2016)
- "Hold On Me" (2016)

Singles

- "Howl" (2013)
- "Burn" (2014)
- "Little Lies" (2015)
- "Trouble" (2016)
- "Hold On Me" (2016)
- "No Good" (2018)
- "Breaking Down" (2019)
- "What You Do To Me" (2019)
- "You Give Me Something" (2019)
