= Lily Mae =

American singer-songwriter

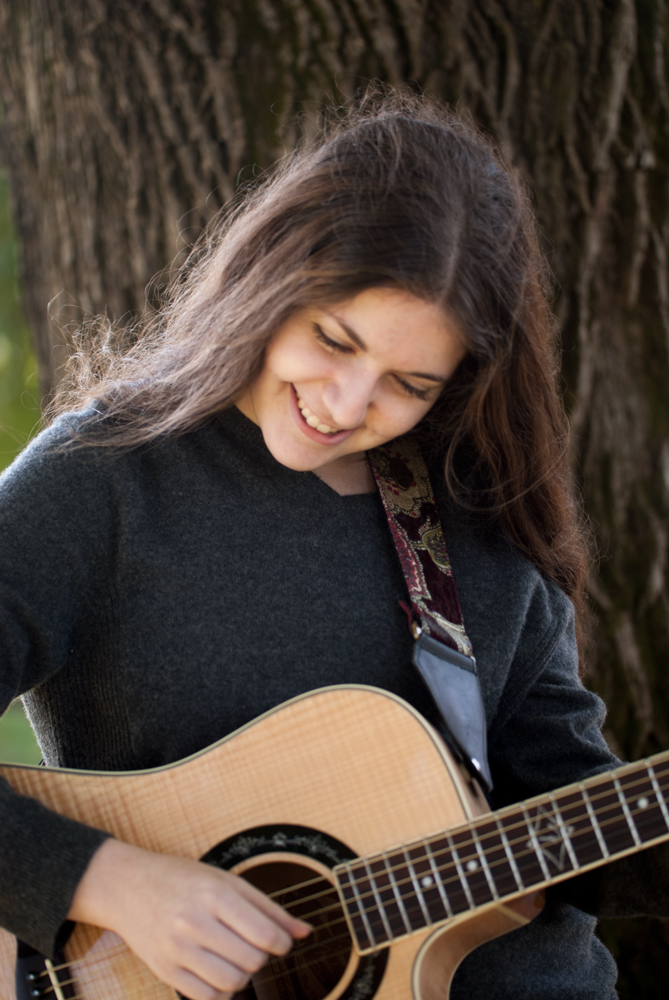
- Mae in 2016

Background information
- Birth name: Lily Mae Oppenheim
- Born: May 23, 1996 (age 28); Bucks County, Pennsylvania
- Origin: Philadelphia
- Genres: Folk rock, Alternative rock, Folk
- Occupation: Singer · songwriter
- Instruments: Vocals, guitar, piano, bass, ukulele
- Years active: 2012–present
- Website: lilymaemusic.com

Lily Mae Oppenheim (born May 23, 1996), known professionally as Lily Mae, is an American singer-songwriter from Philadelphia.

== Early life ==
Mae was born and raised in Bucks County, Pennsylvania, outside of Philadelphia. Her father, Tony Oppenheim, is a bass player, known for his book, Slap It! Funk Studies for the Electric Bass and her mother, Cathy Block, is a songwriter, who has written songs for Diana Ross, Al Jarreau, Kool & the Gang, and Mindless Behavior, and is a music teacher at Solebury School in New Hope, Pennsylvania. She illustrates her upbringing as "never quiet" and describes early memories of "sitting in my mom's guitar case...while she played for me."

Mae attended Solebury School, graduating in 2014, where she held her CD release concert in the school's performing arts center for her debut EP, "Early Days" in 2013.

== Music career ==
=== 2012 to 2014: Early Days EP ===
Mae's first release was an acoustic EP, "Early Days," which was available for digital download in October 2012. It was subsequently featured as New & Noteworthy on iTunes. Philadelphia's non-commercial public FM radio station, WXPN gave Mae's debut EP early support. WXPN host, Helen Leicht chose Mae's debut single, "Early Days," as a Pick of the Day in 2013, which launched Mae into the public eye. During this period she appeared on various WXPN shows as a live guest, including the Folk Show with Gene Shay, Key Studio Sessions, and the Philly Local Show with Helen Leicht.

From 2012 to 2014 Mae toured in support of Joan Osborne, Ben Taylor, Livingston Taylor, Nathaniel Rateliff, Harry Shearer, and Chris Collingwood. In 2014, Mae played at Firefly Music Festival on the coffeehouse stage and Philadelphia Folk Festival in Helen Leicht's WXPN showcase.

=== 2015 to present: Closer ===
In the spring of 2016 it was announced that Mae would release her second EP, "Closer," in the fall. Mae recorded parts of the album in London, England with British producer, Steve Brown, who previously produced Birmingham singer-songwriter Laura Mvula and Rumer. Brown first became aware of Mae when she submitted to open for Laura Mvula. The rest of the album was recorded stateside and produced by Mae and her father. Mae describes the EP as being "...completely how [she] heard it in [her] head" and wrote the songs "...with other instruments in mind," parting from the stripped back style of her debut album.

Mae shared "Diamond" on SoundCloud for International Women's Day on March 8, 2016. It was featured on WXPN that day and has been in rotation since. Mae toured in support of Benjamin Francis Leftwich, Bobby Long, Ari Hest, and Jay Brannan in 2016 and has emerged at the forefront of the Philadelphia music scene. Rookie Magazine premiered the title track of Mae's EP, Closer, on October 25, 2016. Closer is due out November 11, 2016.

== Discography ==
=== Extended plays ===
- Early Days (2012)
- Closer (2016)
