= Separation Day (Delaware) =

Delaware holiday celebrating separation from Pennsylvania

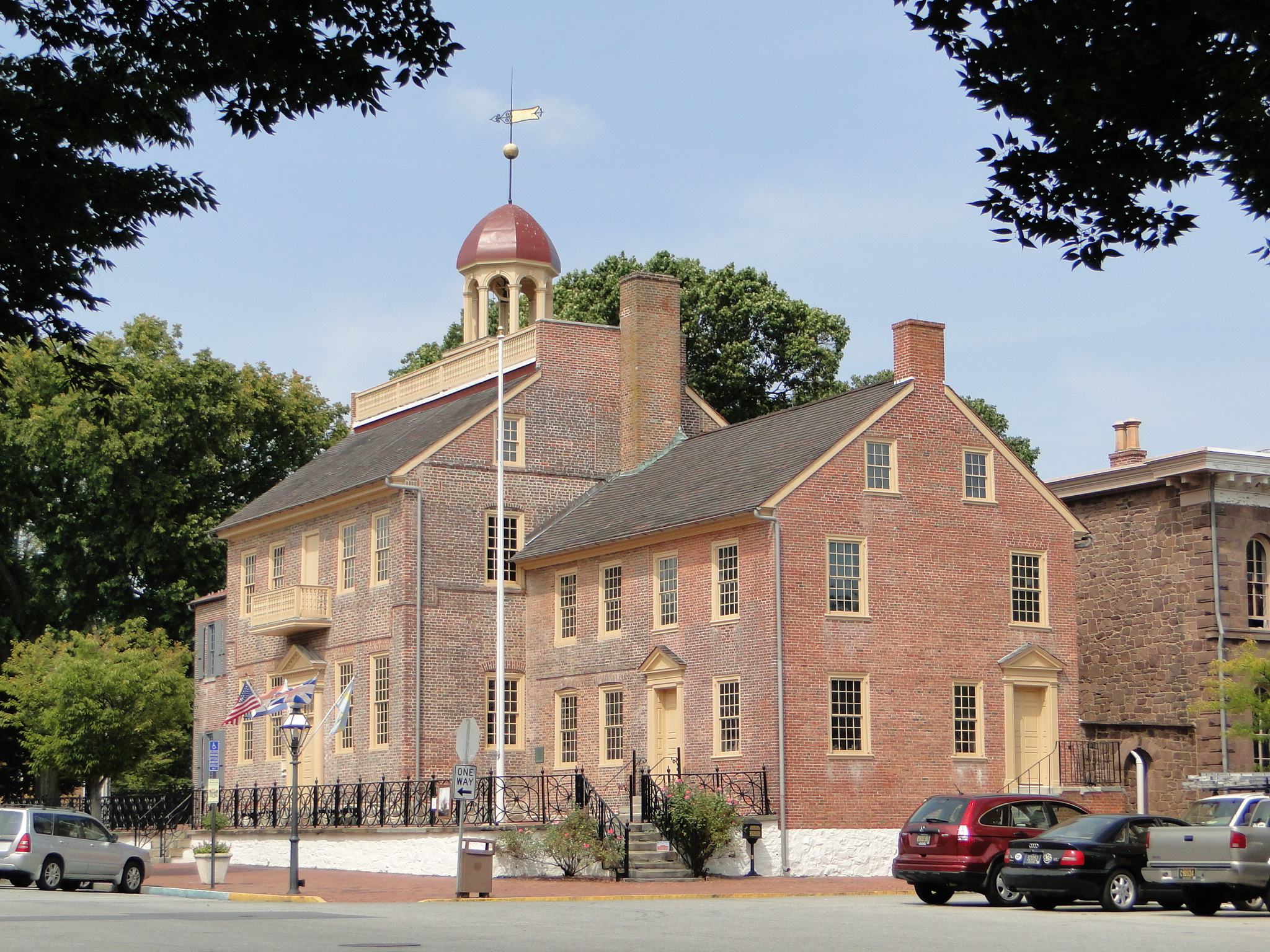
- New Castle Court House where the original separation day events took place
- Observed by: Delaware
- Significance: The day in 1776 that the Delaware declared its separation from Pennsylvania and its independence from the United Kingdom
- Celebrations: Historical reenactments, parades
- Date: June 15
- Frequency: Annual

Separation Day is a holiday in the state of Delaware dating back to 1776, which commemorates the Delaware Colony's independence from the United Kingdom and from Pennsylvania. The first Separation Day occurred on June 15, 1776, when representatives from the Lower Counties on the Delaware met at the New Castle Court House in New Castle, Delaware. The representatives voted to establish the State of Delaware and to declare independence from the United Kingdom. In the current day, the holiday is celebrated annually in New Castle with historical reenactments and parades, although there was a hiatus in the festivities for 2020 and 2021 due to the COVID-19 pandemic.
