= The Shelters (album) =

Studio album by The Shelters
- Released: June 10, 2016
- Genres: Indie rock, alternative rock
- Length: 38:57
- Label: Warner Bros. Records

The Shelters chronology
EP (2015)	The Shelters (2016)	Jupiter Sidecar (2019)

Singles from The Shelters
- 1. "Rebel Heart" Released: 2016

Professional ratings
Review scores
Source	Rating
Paste	(7.8/10)
PopMatters	7/10 stars

The Shelters is the debut album by American rock band the Shelters. Co-produced by Tom Petty, it was released by Warner Bros. Records on June 10, 2016.

== Track listing ==
All tracks are written by the Shelters, except track 4 written by Ray Davies.

No.	Title	Length
1.	"Rebel Heart"	3:59
2.	"Birdwatching"	3:31
3.	"Liar"	3:04
4.	"Nothin' in the World Can Stop Me Worryin' 'Bout That Girl"	3:06
5.	"Surely Burn"	3:05
6.	"The Ghost Is Gone"	5:44
7.	"Gold"	3:21
8.	"Never Look Behind Ya"	3:11
9.	"Fortune Teller"	2:55
10.	"Dandelion Ridge"	3:02
11.	"Born to Fly"	3:59
12.	"Down"	4:14

Hidden track
No.	Title	Length
13.	"Untitled"	0:59
Total length:		38:57
