= The Lawsuits =

American indie rock band

- Origin: Philadelphia, Pennsylvania, U.S.
- Genre: Indie/Folk/Pop
- Members: Brian Dale Allen Strouse, Vanessa Winters, Josh Friedman, Brendan Cunningham
- Website: https://www.thelawsuitsband.com

The Lawsuits is an American indie rock band from Philadelphia, Pennsylvania, led by songwriter Brian Dale Allen Strouse and vocalist Vanessa Winters

== History ==
The band was started by Brian Dale Allen Strouse in New Hope, Pennsylvania with Vanessa Winters and Brendan Cunningham, and later added Josh Friedman. The band started recording home demos and performing live in 2010 at small clubs in Bucks County, Pennsylvania and Philadelphia.

In August 2012, the band performed at the 22nd Annual Concerts in the Park series presented by Philadelphia Weekly and FUZE in Rittenhouse Square with Ground Up. In September of that year, The Lawsuits performed at the 2012 WHYY Connections Festival with Yo La Tengo, Frank Turner, Maps & Atlases, and Fabian Akilles.

In 2013, the band was named the Philadelphia Indie Band of the Year by Tri-State Indie at the Tri-State Indie Awards. In March 2013, The Lawsuits recorded and released a Key Studio Session by WXPN. Daytrotter released a session by the band in September 2013. They have performed at CMJ Music Festival (2012-2013), 2013 Philadelphia Folk Festival on the main stage, and have shared the stage with Sturgill Simpson, Skylar Grey, Delta Spirit, The All-American Rejects, Lake Street Dive, The Vaccines, Frank Turner, Yo La Tengo, J Roddy Walston & the Business, Good Old War, Maps & Atlases.

Over the course of 3 months (October 2012- December 2012), The Lawsuits recorded Cool Cool Cool. It was produced and mixed by Bill Moriarty at his studio in East Falls, Pennsylvania. Howie Weinberg mastered the album at his studio in Los Angeles. The band released Cool Cool Cool in October 2013. The band garnered some national attention with the release of Cool Cool Cool via Artist Direct and MSN Music, premiering songs via Rolling Stone Magazine, Spin (magazine), and a music video via Paste (magazine). Drum tracks for Love is Weight were recorded at the Converse Rubber Tracks Studio in Brooklyn, NY.

== Members ==
- Brian Dale Allen Strouse- Vocals, Guitar
- Vanessa Winters - Vocals
- Brendan Cunningham - Bass
- Josh Friedman - Drums

== Discography ==
- Darleen (2012)
- Hot Love EP (2012)
- Numbers EP (2012)
- Love Is Weight (2013)
- Cool Cool Cool (2013)
- Tumbled EP (2014)
