= The Shelters =

American rock band

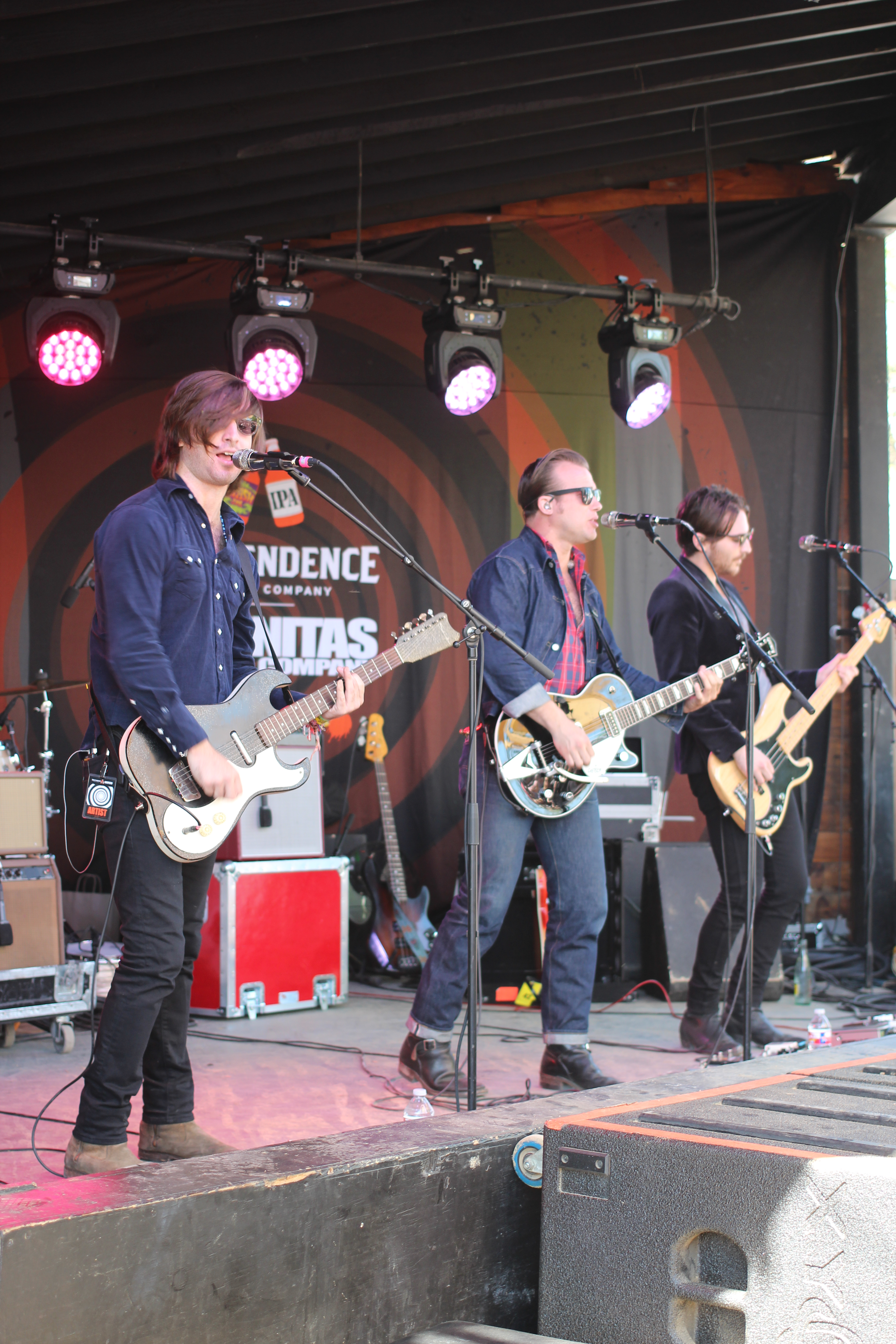
- The Shelters performing live in 2015

Background information
- Origin: Los Angeles, California, U.S.
- Genres: Indie rock; alternative rock; Southern rock; country rock; heartland rock; blues rock
- Years active: 2014–2021
- Label: Warner Bros.
- Past members: Chase Simpson; Josh Jové; Sebastian Harris; Jacob Pillot
- Website: Official website (2016)

The Shelters were an American rock band, formed in 2014 in Los Angeles, California by Chase Simpson, Josh Jové and Sebastian Harris.

All members of the band had previously played in the band Automatik Slim. Tom Petty took an interest in the band and gave them the keys to his home studio, offering a listening ear and advice on whatever they were working on. They spent countless hours in his studio, working both on their own and with Petty. Both Jové and Simpson have credit on Tom Petty and the Heartbreakers’s 2014 album Hypnotic Eye and on Mudcrutch's 2016 album 2.

The band released their eponymous debut album on June 10, 2016 via Warner Bros. Records. Their second album, Jupiter Sidecar was released on September 20, 2019. Tom Petty (who died in 2017) acted as a sounding board for many of the tracks when they were in their demo stages, including "Strange", "Waiting for Life to Begin", and "Can't Go Home".

== Discography ==
=== Albums ===
- The Shelters (2016)
- Jupiter Sidecar (2019)

=== EPs ===
- EP (2015)

=== Singles ===
- "Rebel Heart" (2016) - #40 Alternative Songs
- "Really Wanted You" / "So Get Out" 7" (2017) (Record Store Day Exclusive)
- "You're Different" (2019)

== Members ==
- Chase Simpson – vocals, guitar
- Josh Jové – vocals, guitar
- Sebastian Harris – drums
- Jacob Pillot – Bass
