= Too Bad Jim =

Studio album by R. L. Burnside
- Released: 1994
- Recorded: April 1993
- Studio: Junior's Place, Chulahoma, Mississippi
- Genre: Blues, hill country blues
- Label: Fat Possum
- Producer: Robert Palmer

R. L. Burnside chronology
Bad Luck City (1992)	Too Bad Jim (1994)	A Ass Pocket of Whiskey (1996)

Too Bad Jim is an album by the American musician R. L. Burnside, released in 1994. It is considered his breakthrough album. He supported it with a North American tour.

== Production ==
Produced by Robert Palmer, the album was recorded at Junior Kimbrough's Junior's Place, where the sessions were interrupted by instrument and studio mishaps. Burnside was backed by Calvin Jackson on drums, Dwayne Burnside on bass, and Kenny Brown on guitar. The music added rawer, electrified influences to northern Mississippi fife and drum blues. "Short-Haired Woman", written by Lightnin' Hopkins, rejects the predominate image of Black female attractiveness. "Shake 'Em On Down" is a cover of the Bukka White standard; Burnside performed it in tribute to Mississippi Fred McDowell, as it was his favorite song. "When My First Wife Left Me" is a cover of the John Lee Hooker song.

== Critical reception ==
Professional ratings
Review scores
Source	Rating
All Music Guide	5/5 stars
The Encyclopedia of Popular Music	3/5 stars
The Indianapolis Star	3/4 stars
Knoxville News Sentinel	A
MusicHound Blues: The Essential Album Guide	4.5/5 stars
The Penguin Guide to Blues Recordings	3.5/4 stars
Philadelphia Daily News	3.5/4 stars
Pittsburgh Post-Gazette	4/4 stars
Rolling Stone	3.5/5 stars
The Rolling Stone Jazz & Blues Album Guide	4/5 stars

The Chicago Tribune said, "The music is driven by rhythmic thrusts rather than chord changes, and the interplay among the stellar musicians is explosive." The New York Times noted that "the northern Mississippi blues tradition is pretty obscure, and it's all about repetition and droning, about the subtle colorations of rhythm that trance music needs to be effective." The Pittsburgh Post-Gazette stated, "A master of the gallows humor and dramatic narrative tradition that runs through African-American cultural expressions like I-70, Burnside embodies the comic and tragic excesses of black music, while critiquing its inability to move beyond the perennially youthful aesthetic that enslaves black radio."

Rolling Stone opined that "Burnside delivers a searing set of songs anchored in tradition". The Washington Post said that Burnside "often uses his guitar to hypnotic effect, creating rhythmic vamps that have a churning, mesmeric quality, while singing in a baritone voice that bellows and moans." The Knoxville News Sentinel concluded that "Burnside learned a lot from Mississippi Fred McDowell, but it sounds like playing tough juke joints provided him with his most important lessons." Time considered the music to be "of historic import". The Calgary Herald listed Too Bad Jim among the best albums of 1994.

== Track listing ==
No.	Title	Length
1.	"Shake 'Em On Down"
2.	"When My First Wife Left Me"
3.	"Short-Haired Woman"
4.	"Old Black Mattie"
5.	"Fireman Ring the Bell"
6.	"Peaches"
7.	"Miss Glory B."
8.	".44 Pistol"
9.	"Death Bell Blues"
10.	"Goin' Down South"
