= R. L. Boyce =

American blues musician (1955–2023)

- Born: Robert L. Boyce; August 15, 1955; Como, Mississippi, U.S.
- Died: November 9, 2023 (aged 68) Como, Mississippi, U.S.
- Genres: Blues, Hill country blues, garage rock
- Occupation: Musician
- Instruments: Guitar, vocals
- Years active: 1960s–2023
- Label: Waxploitation

Robert L. Boyce (August 15, 1955 – November 9, 2023) was an American blues singer, songwriter, and guitarist born and raised in Como, Mississippi.

== Life and career ==
Boyce was a protege of Hill country blues musicians including R. L. Burnside and Mississippi Fred McDowell.

Boyce began his career in the early 1960s playing drums for his uncle, the fife and drum performer Othar Turner. Later he was the drummer for Jessie Mae Hemphill and is heard on her 1990 album, Feelin' Good.

His debut album, Ain't the Man's Alright, was released in 2013 and featured musicians including Cedric Burnside, Luther Dickinson, and Calvin Jackson.

His second album release, Roll and Tumble, was released on September 8, 2017, on Waxploitation Records. The album included the father and son double drumming team of Cedric Burnside (R. L. Burnside's grandson and drummer) and Calvin Jackson. The album was produced by Luther Dickinson and David Katznelson. It was nominated for a 2018 Grammy Award in the Best Traditional Blues Album category.

The cover of Roll and Tumble is a portrait of R. L. Boyce, painted by the contemporary artist James Jean.

In February 2023, he was named as one of nine National Heritage Fellowships by the National Endowment for the Arts (NEA), alongside Roen Hufford, Elizabeth James-Perry, Luis Tapia, Wu Man, and others.

== Death ==
Boyce died in Como, Mississippi, on November 9, 2023, at the age of 68, following a diagnosis of lung cancer. His death was announced in a press release by the National Endowment of the Arts on November 14.

== Studio albums ==
- Ain't the Man's Alright (Sutro Park, 2013)
- Roll and Tumble (Waxploitation Records, 2017)
- Rattlesnake Boogie (Waxploitation, 2018)
- Ain't Gonna Play Too Long (Waxploitation, 2018)

== Documentaries featuring Boyce ==
- Martin Scorsese Presents The Blues: A Musical Journey (2003) featured the song "Shortnin'" / "Henduck Traditional" by Otha Turner which included Boyce on bass and snare drums.
- M for Mississippi (2008) included an interview with Boyce
- Moonshine & Mojo Hands (2014) included an interview with Boyce
- I Am The Blues (2015) included a performance by Boyce

== Awards and honors ==
- 2018: Grammy nomination for Best Traditional Blues Album
- 2018: Blues Music Award nomination for Traditional Blues Male Artist
- 2018: Blues Music Award nomination for Best Emerging Artist Album (Roll and Tumble)
- 2022: Blues Music Award nomination for Traditional Blues Album (Boogie w/ R. L. Boyce Live)
- 2023: recipient of a National Heritage Fellowship awarded by the National Endowment for the Arts, which is the United States government's highest honor in the folk and traditional arts.
