= Lil' Dave Thompson =

American blues guitarist, singer and songwriter (1969–2010)

- Also known as: David Thompson, Little Dave, Dave Thompson
- Born: David Lonzo Thompson; May 21, 1969; Jackson, Mississippi, United States
- Died: February 14, 2010 (aged 40) Aiken County, South Carolina, United States
- Genres: Electric blues
- Occupations: Guitarist, singer, songwriter
- Instruments: Guitar, vocals
- Years active: 1980s–2010
- Labels: Fat Possum, JSP, Electro-Fi

David Lonzo Thompson (May 21, 1969 – February 14, 2010) was an American electric blues guitarist, singer and songwriter, best known by his stage name Lil' Dave Thompson. He is best known for his tracks "She Didn't Say Goodbye" and "I Got the Blues".

== Life and career ==
David Lonzo Thompson was born in Jackson, Mississippi, United States. His father, Sam Thompson, had played the blues with Asie Payton, Paul "Wine" Jones, and James "Son" Thomas among others. With his encouragement, Thompson learned to play blues guitar by the age of nine, and he formed his first group, the Delta Blues Band, in Leland, Mississippi in his early teens. He teamed up with Booba Barnes in 1984, and played the Mississippi juke joint circuit.

He first recorded on I Got the Dog in Me (1994), a Fat Possum Records release, providing guitar backing for David Malone, one of Junior Kimbrough's sons. Thompson's own debut record was Little Dave and Big Love (1995). It was also released by Fat Possum. Little Dave and Big Love was produced by Robert Palmer, and nominated for two W. C. Handy Awards in 1996 for 'Best New Blues Artist' and 'Contemporary Blues Album'.

In 2002, Thompson released C'mon Down to the Delta on JSP Records. In 2006, Got to Get Over You appeared, issued by Electro-Fi Records, while Deep in the Night followed in 2008. Regarding the latter, Down Beat magazine stated it was "Incendiary and feral, with a church choir hustle and a Mississippi hill country stomp". Constant touring gave Thompson a growing loyal audience.

In 2012, C'mon Down to the Delta was re-released.

== Death ==
On February 14, 2010, and following the last gig of their tour at Fiery Ron's Home Team BBQ in Sullivan's Island, South Carolina, his entourage were driving back to Greenville, Mississippi, when his band's touring Ford van overturned on Interstate 20 in Aiken County, South Carolina. Thompson was thrown from the passenger seat and pronounced dead on arrival. He was aged 40. Thompson was buried in Indianola, Mississippi.

== Discography ==
| Year | Title | Record label |
|---|---|---|
| 1995 | Little Dave and Big Love | Fat Possum |
| 2002 | C'mon Down to the Delta | JSP |
| 2006 | Got to Get Over You | Electro-Fi |
| 2008 | Deep in the Night | Electro-Fi |

== See also ==
- List of electric blues musicians
