= Come On In (album) =

Remix album by R. L. Burnside
- Released: August 11, 1998
- Genre: Delta blues; electric blues; dance; electronic; trip hop
- Length: 43:06
- Label: Fat Possum
- Producer: Tom Rothrock; Bob Corritore; Beal Dabbs; Alec Empire

R. L. Burnside chronology
Acoustic Stories (1997)	Come On In (1998)	My Black Name a-Ringin' (1999)

Come On In is a remix album by Delta blues guitarist R. L. Burnside, released by the label Fat Possum in 1998. Largely produced by Tom Rothrock, the album was a departure for Burnside in that it fuses his blues guitar work with dance and electronic music, incorporating sampling and looping techniques. Burnside was originally skeptical of the idea, but enjoyed the finished product. Although the album's fusion of styles was deemed unusual by critics, it received acclaim from music journalists and showed respectable sales, becoming the best-selling album distributed by Epitaph Records in early 1999. The album's sound was explored by Burnside in his later works.

== Background ==
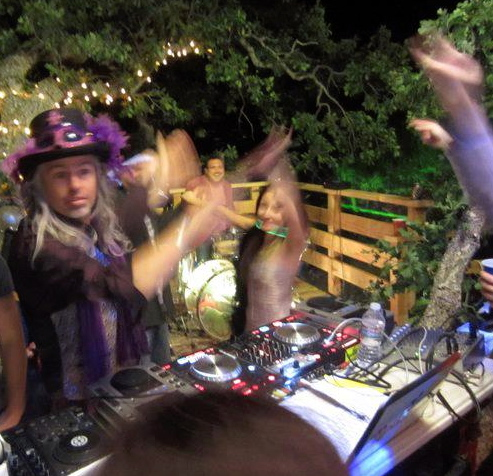
The majority of Come On In was produced by Tom Rothrock (pictured in 2012)

Although one of the original Delta blues guitarists, and pioneer of a style known as "trance blues," R. L. Burnside did not find wide success until 1991, when he signed to Fat Possum, a label based in Oxford, Mississippi. Too Bad Jim, one of the guitarists' first albums for the label, was produced by pop critic Robert Palmer, and soon Burnside performed as the opening act for avant-garde rock band the Jon Spencer Blues Explosion, with whom he recorded the 1996 collaboration A Ass Pocket of Whiskey, which was a largely traditional blues album, excepting the sporadic usage of theremin. Nonetheless, Burnside's 1997 album Mr Wizzard was poorly received by critics, who felt the music was uninspired. Conscious of what they perceived to be "the devaluation of their most popular artist", Fat Possum quickly commissioned Come On In, an album containing remixes of Burnside recordings.

By then aged 71, Burnside was originally skeptical of the idea of a remix album, although agreed to it. He later told interviewer Ed Mabe of Perfect Sound Forever, "that was the record companies idea. They said, 'RL, we oughta do something like we did with Jon Spencer.' And I said, 'well, I don't give a damn. Let's do it.' And we went on and did it." The album was largely produced by Tom Rothrock, excepting a live version of "Come On In" produced by Bob Corritore, as well as "Don't Stop Honey", which was produced and engineered by Deal Babbs, who also performed programming, clavinet and organ on the piece, and "Heat", which was produced and mixed by Alec Empire. Rothrock was best known for producing Beck, whereas Empire was a member of Atari Teenage Riot. Burnside had not met Rothrock before the album was created, later saying: "I never got a chance to meet him. He just made it and sent it." Nonetheless, the pair later spoke several times after Come On In had been finished. Despite The Guardian later suggesting that Burnside was indifferent to Come On In, the guitarist told Mabe that he "loved" the album.

== Composition ==
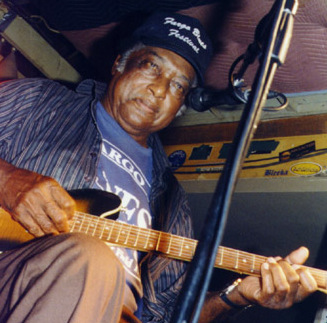
R.L. Burnside in 1998.

Come On In remixes Burnside's music with electronic beats, resulting in a noisy fusion of blues and dance music. According to writer Matthew Hilburn, "Seldom does one see the words 'dub,' 'remix' and 'programming' on a Delta blues album, but R.L. Burnside is no ordinary bluesman." Burnside felt the fusion was natural, saying "Adam and Eve were dancing to the blues. Blues is nothing but dance music." Throughout the album, fragmented samples of bluesy moans and hollers, wailing guitar licks and heavy hill country blues rhythms are scratched, mixed and cut with Beck-style beats and a plethora of disc jockey samples and hip hop techniques. Drum machines are also employed on the record. The Los Angeles Times described the album as displaying a "boogie-meets-B-boy sound," whereas Modern Drummer felt the album was a "weird fusion of Old South and East Village."

Despite the fusion of blues and electronic being unusual, the music highlights how both genres emphasise hypnotic grooves, and usage of repetition; according to writer Keith Phipps, "hearing the same riffs and vocals looped repeatedly with the help of machines isn't worlds away from hearing the blues played straight. That's not to say it's the same thing, [...] but it helps that Tom Rothrock's production places the emphasis on Burnside, whose vocals and guitar dominate even 'Heat,' the beat-heavy Empire track." Several tracks, like "Let My Baby Ride" and "Been Mistreated", feature a real drum set instead of electronic beats, Many of the album's beats are played by Burnside's grandson Cedric Burnside, who emphasises hi-hat, kick, and snare to deliver a funky sound.

"Let My Baby Ride" features a heavy looped beat, which frames the guitar riffs in a downbeat. "Don't Stop Honey" and "It's Bad You Know" are among the more techno-heavy tracks. The solo tracks "Come On In" and "Just Like a Woman" are the least "techno-fied" recordings, displaying Burnside playing touch riffs and lacking the trip hop style of the other tracks. "Heat" is in a garage rock style, whereas "Rollin' Tumblin' (Remix)" features a four-on-the-floor disco groove laid over Burnside's twelve-bar blues.

== Release and reception ==
Professional ratings
Review scores
Source	Rating
AllMusic	3/5 stars
The Penguin Guide to Blues Recordings	1.5/4 stars

Come On Inside was released by Fat Possum on August 11, 1998; Rothrock's label Bong Load Custom Records released a remix of "Rollin' Tumblin'" as a maxi-single. The album was expected to alienate purist fans of blues, but sold strongly, and peaked at number 20 on the Core Radio Chart. In addition to significant airplay, an ensuing music clip was slotted in MTV's 120 Minutes. By March 1999, it had become Epitaph's best-selling record, despite the label being, at its core, an outlet for punk rock. Burnside said that fans loved the album, feeling that both it and Ass Pocket "brought more crowds to the blues. They love it." He reckoned that this was due to "trying to make people dance to the blues again." The album received critical acclaim according to Modern Drummer, who themselves said "Come On In features some of the sloppiest yet funkiest drumming we've heard in a long time, so primal it's perfect. [...] Although far from flawless, Come On In chains up your brain and hauls it away. If you can't groove to this, check your pulse."

In a "Best New Music" review for CMJ New Music Monthly, James Lien felt that the album presented "the next evolution of blues, something much more modern than that genre tag suggests," and commented that "Come On In establishes the connection between a Mississippi juke joint and Paul's Boutique, between white lightning and Mellow Gold." Keith Phipps of The A.V. Club positively commented that the album emphasised the usage of repetition key to both blues and electronic music, and said: "More a novelty than a proper album—and lacking much of the fire Burnside is capable of generating—Come On In is still a compelling experiment that finds connections between old and new that aren't readily apparent." Billboard gave Come On In a "Spotlight" review, saying "the skill and restraint with which studio veteran Tom Rothrock treats the music of juke-joint veteran R.L. Burnside results in a happy collision of styles."

"The real rhythmic glue is R.L.'s grandson, the powerhouse drummer who nails most of the beats on Come On In; it's all about the hypnotic power of the groove, whether it's the droning guitars in a Mississippi roadhouse or the bonus beats buried inside groove of a hip-hop 12"."

—James Lien, CMJ New Music Monthly.

Among less favourable reviews, Matthew Hilburn of AllMusic felt the album was partly successful in bringing "one of America's oldest musical forms into the 21st century," but felt that the album's "risky move" in bringing looping and sampling techniques to Delta Blues did not always pay off. He highlighted the tracks without electronic production and concluded: "Next time out, if Burnside gets his ass pocket o' whiskey, turns down the techno a bit and cranks those amps up, he could be onto something." David Kornhaber of The Harvard Crimson agreed that the dance element to the album "hardly matches Burnside's bluesy croonings," commenting: "Maybe blues really is nothing but dance music, but the rhythms of the Mississippi delta are not those of modern dance clubs."

Jaime Mather of music marketing group Planetary Group and College Media officer Alex Ellerson both included the album among their ten favourites of 1998, as published in CMJ New Music Monthly. In his book Walking Blues: Making Americans from Emerson to Elvis, writer Tim Parrish praises Come On In alongside Too Bad Jim, another Burnside album, saying that Burnside was most notable when working in the electric blues idiom, and commenting that the two albums "are a stunning example of how blues can absorb the styles it inspired–from Jimi Hendrix to heavy metal." Burnside developed upon the album's B-boy and boogie sound on Wish I Was in Heaven Sitting Down (2000).

== Track listing ==
1. "Been Mistreated" (R.L. Burnside, Tom Rothrock) – 1:07
2. "Come On In" (live) (Burnside) – 3:06
3. "Let My Baby Ride" (Burnside, Rothrock) – 3:00
4. "Don't Stop Honey" (Burnside, Beal Dabbs) – 4:13
5. "It's Bad You Know" (Burnside, Rothrock) – 4:58
6. "Just Like a Woman" (Burnside) – 3:32
7. "Come On In (Part 2)" (Burnside, Rothrock) – 3:11
8. "Rollin' Tumblin' (Remix)" (Burnside, Rothrock) – 4:14
9. "Please Don't Stay" (Burnside, Rothrock) – 2:59
10. "Shuck Dub" (Burnside, Dabbs) – 4:28
11. "Come On In (Part 3)" (Burnside, Rothrock) – 2:47
12. "Heat" (Burnside) – 5:08

== Personnel ==
Adapted from the liner notes of Come On In

- Cedric Burnside – drums (tracks 1, 3, 4, 12)
- Bruce Watson – engineering (1, 3, 5, 7–9, 11)
- Doug Boehm – engineering (1, 3, 5, 7–9, 11)
- Kenny Brown – guitar (4, 8, 11, 12), slide guitar (3)
- R.L. Burnside – guitar (1–4, 6–11), vocals (1–6, 8–12)
- Don C. Tylor – mastering
- David Barry – photography (cover photo)
- Laurie Hoffma – photography (inner photo)
- Tom Rothrock – production (1, 3, 5–9, 11), programming (1, 3, 5, 7–9, 11), bass (11)
- Bob Corritore – production (2)
- Beale Dabbs (misspelled as Beal Dabbs) – production (4, 10), engineering (4, 10), mixing (4, 10), programming (4, 10), clavinet (4), organ (4), bass (10), writing (4, 10)
- Joe Rameri – drums (5)
- Lester Butler – harmonica (5)
- Alejandro Rosso – organ (5)
- Calvin Jackson – drums (6)
- John Oreshnick – drums (7, 9)
- Joe Ranieri – drums (8)
- Joey Waronker – drums (8)
- Alec Empire – remix (12), production (12), mixing (12)
