= Sid Hemphill =

American blues multi-instrumentalist and bandleader (1878–1961)

- Hemphill in 1959

Background information
- Born: September 13, 1878; Panola County, Mississippi, U.S.
- Died: October 20, 1961 (aged 83) Holly Springs, Mississippi, U.S.
- Genre: Blues
- Occupations: Musician; composer; bandleader
- Instruments: Fiddle; banjo; guitar; jaw harp; piano; organ; pan flute; fife
- Relatives: Rosa Lee Hill (daughter); Jessie Mae Hemphill (granddaughter)

Sid Hemphill (September 13, 1878 (Note: State records list his date of birth as September 13, 1878, while his own statement to Alan Lomax is 1876.) – October 20, 1961) was an American blues multi-instrumentalist and bandleader who played in his own string band, mainly in Mississippi. He recorded for Alan Lomax in 1942 and 1959.

== Biography ==
Born in Panola County, Mississippi, the son of a slave fiddler, Hemphill was blind and crafted instruments. Trained as a multi-instrumentalist, he could effectively play the fiddle, banjo, guitar, jaw harp, piano, organ, quills, and the cane fife, while also writing songs. Hemphill and his string band, composed of Alex "Turpentine" Askew (guitar), Lucious Smith (banjo), and Will Head (bass drum), played a combination of old time, blues, popular, and spiritual music for both black and white audiences mainly in Northern Mississippi. The group also identified as a fife and drums band, with music influenced by the European military drum tradition and African polyrhythms and the talking drum. According to the blues writer Edward Komara, Hemphill's quill playing was highly syncopated and offered the closest connection to traditional African music.

Field collector and ethnomusicologist Alan Lomax traveled to Senatobia to seek out Hemphill after a local string bandleader described him as the "boar-hog musician of the hills" and "the best musician in the world". On August 15, 1942, Lomax recorded 22 songs and an interview with Hemphill and his group. Lomax recorded a second session with Hemphill in 1959. Music journalist Amanda Petrusich noted in a review for Pitchfork that "Hemphill's work incorporates attributes of the Mississippi Hill Country's better-known traditions (the droning guitar blues mastered by McDowell, R. L. Burnside, and Junior Kimbrough, and the fife-and-drum music practiced by Otha Turner, Napoleon Strickland, and Hemphill himself)", which differs from the neighboring Delta blues. His best-known song, "The Eighth of January", became the basis for Johnny Horton's hit "The Battle of New Orleans".

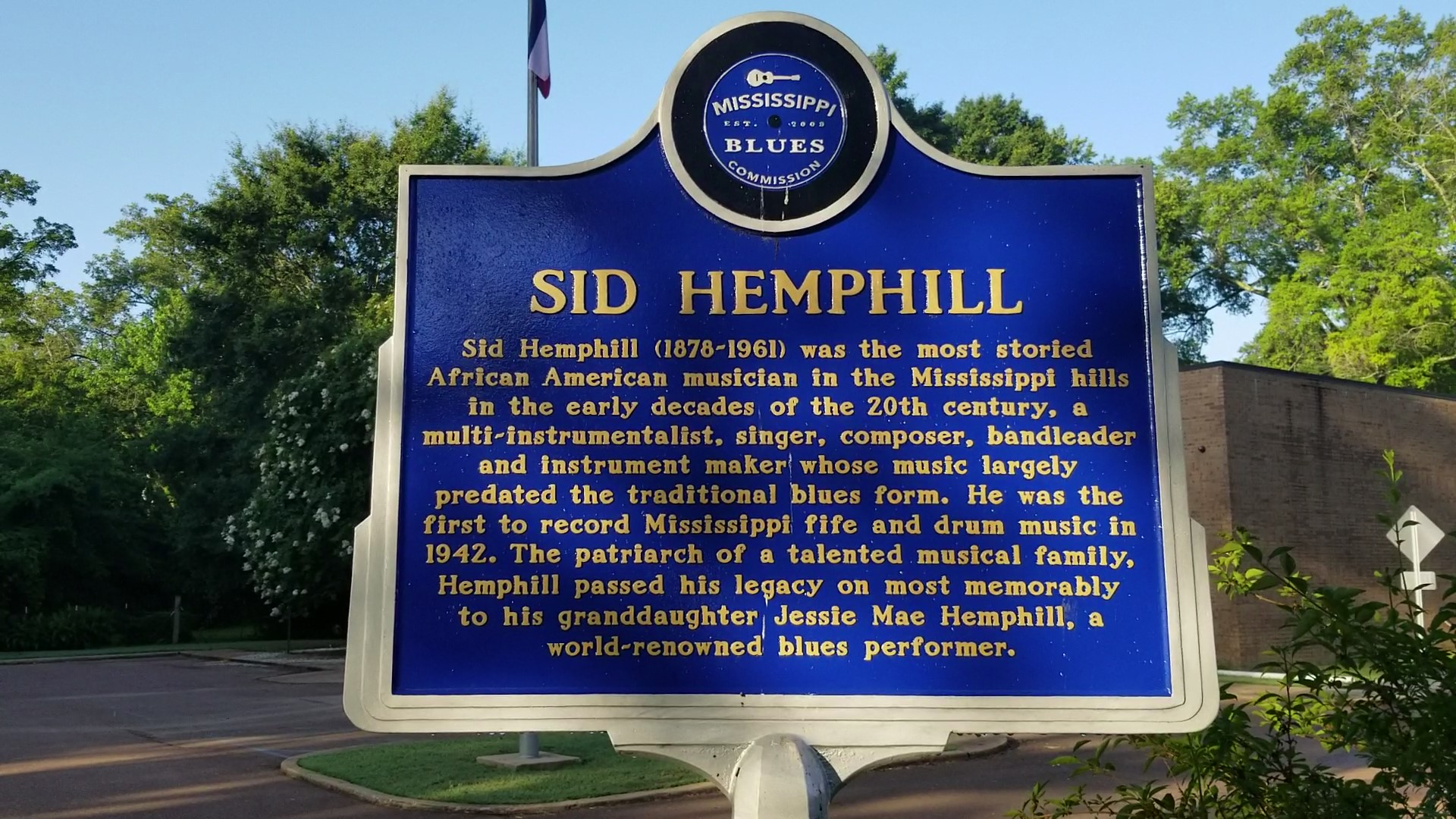
Hemphill's marker on the Mississippi Blues Trail

Hemphill died in Holly Springs in 1961, having never commercially recorded any of his songs for release in his lifetime. Nonetheless, his two field sessions with Lomax were made more accessible by the release of the compilation album The Devil's Dream in 2013. Other members of the Hemphill family also became musicians, including his daughter, Rosa Lee Hill, and his paternal granddaughter, Jessie Mae Hemphill, a pioneering guitarist.

Hemphill was honored with a marker on the Mississippi Blues Trail in Senatobia.
