= Burnside on Burnside =

Live album by R. L. Burnside
- Released: October 23, 2001
- Recorded: January 21–24, 2001
- Venues: Crystal Ballroom (Portland, Oregon); Great American Music Hall (San Francisco, California)
- Genre: Blues
- Length: 52:51
- Label: Fat Possum
- Producers: Bruce Watson; Matthew Johnson

Professional ratings
Aggregate scores
Source	Rating
Metacritic	78/100
Review scores
Source	Rating
AllMusic	4/5 stars
The Village Voice	(2-star Honorable Mention)

Burnside on Burnside is a live album by American musician R. L. Burnside, released on October 23, 2001, via Fat Possum Records. All the songs were recorded live at the Crystal Ballroom in Portland on January 21, 2001, except "Miss Maybelle", "Goin' Down South", "Alice Mae" and "Snake Drive", which were recorded live at the Great American Music Hall in San Francisco on January 24, 2001. Produced by Bruce Watson and Matthew Johnson, it features co-performances from Kenny Brown and Cedric Burnside.

It was nominated for a Grammy Award for Best Traditional Blues Album at the 45th Annual Grammy Awards.

== Track listing ==
All tracks are written by R. L. Burnside, except tracks 4 and 6, which are traditional, and tracks 11 and 12 written with Kenny Brown.

No.	Title	Length
1.	"Shake 'Em on Down"	4:35
2.	"Skinny Woman"	2:41
3.	"Miss Maybelle"	3:16
4.	"Rollin' and Tumblin'"	4:44
5.	"Long Haired Doney"	4:01
6.	"Walkin' Blues"	4:28
7.	"He Ain't Your Daddy"	2:43
8.	"Bad Luck and Trouble"	3:55
9.	"Jumper on the Line"	5:16
10.	"Goin' Down South"	5:44
11.	"Alice Mae"	4:12
12.	"Snake Drive"	7:16
Total length:		52:51

== Personnel ==
- R.L. Burnside – songwriter (tracks: 1–3, 5, 7–12), vocals, guitar, arranger (tracks: 4, 6)
- Kenny Brown – songwriter (tracks: 11, 12), guitar, arranger (track 4)
- Cedric Burnside – drums
- Bruce Watson – producer, mixing
- Matthew Johnson – producer
- Steve Beatty – recording
- Mark Yoshida – mastering
- Adam Smith – photography
- Mark Mauer – photography
- Cole Gerst – design
- Jay Babcock – liner notes

== Charts ==
Chart (2001)	Peak position
US Top Blues Albums (Billboard)	4
