= Calvin Jackson (drummer) =

American drummer

Calvin Jackson (January 22, 1961, in Holly Springs, Mississippi – February 10, 2015, in Senatobia, Mississippi) was an American drummer from north Mississippi. He is considered an innovator in the Hill country blues style of drumming, having incorporated elements of the regional Fife and drum bands style in the blues band setting.

As a young teen he sang in the choir, and then joined the Jubilee Hummingbirds. At age 16, Jackson was drumming with bluesman R. L. Burnside. Burnside's daughter Linda had Jackson's son 1978, Cedric Burnside, and they would later marry. Jackson appeared in recordings of Burnside's band, sometimes called The Sound Machine, starting in 1979. Beside the traditional influence, David Evans credited him with bringing in the modern funk, RnB and soul influences of the band.

Later Jackson appeared on record with Junior Kimbrough (including in the cult documentary, Deep Blues), Jessie Mae Hemphill, CeDell Davis, R.L. Boyce and Markus James He performed live with Lightnin' Malcolm, Sean "Bad" Apple, and Little Joe Ayers.

In the mid 1990s he moved to the Netherlands to continue his musical career His son Cedric would take his place at Burnside's drums. In 1999 he released the only album under his own name, Calvin Jackson & Mississippi Bound's Goin' Down South. Participating were Cass Ian (vocals, guitar), Caret De Neeve (double bass) and Ludo "lazy lew" Beckers (harmonica). The album was nominated for a Blues Music Award in the category of "Best New Artist Debut".
