= Mr. Wizard (R. L. Burnside album) =

Studio album by R. L. Burnside
- Released: 1997
- Genre: Blues
- Label: Fat Possum

R. L. Burnside chronology
A Ass Pocket of Whiskey (1996)	Mr. Wizard (1997)	Acoustic Stories (1997)

Mr. Wizard is an album by the American musician R. L. Burnside, released in 1997. The cover art is by Derek Hess.

The album peaked at No. 12 on Billboard's Top Blues Albums chart. Burnside supported the album with a North American tour.

== Production ==
The album was recorded in part by Matthew Johnson, at Lunati Farms, in Mississippi, and by Rob Schnapf and Tom Rothrock, at Bongload Custom Records, in Los Angeles. The Los Angeles tracks were recorded live and without overdubbing. The Jon Spencer Blues Explosion backed Burnside on two tracks. Burnside's grandson Cedric played drums on the album; Kenny Brown played guitar. "You Gotta Move" is a cover of the blues standard. "Rollin' & Tumblin'" was written by Muddy Waters.

== Critical reception ==
Professional ratings
Review scores
Source	Rating
AllMusic	3/5 stars
The Atlanta Journal-Constitution	B
Robert Christgau	(1-star Honorable Mention)
MusicHound Blues: The Essential Album Guide	3/5 stars
The Penguin Guide to Blues Recordings	3.5/4 stars

The Irish Times noted that Burnside "is at his most persuasive armed solely with his guitar, as on the memorable opening 'Over the Hill' and the closing 'You Gotta Move', where his voice is a vivid portrait of desperation." Robert Christgau praised "Alice Mae". The Observer wrote that the album "captures his abrasive, electric style nicely." The Atlanta Journal-Constitution stated that "Mr. Wizard continues an effort to infiltrate the alternative market with something far spookier than Marilyn Manson... Funny, then, that the most powerful track here is a solo spiritual number." The Sydney Morning Herald determined that the songs "generally involve R. L. yelling something about snakes, women or sex over a cacophonous blizzard of primordial guitar, which ends when someone falls over or the drums stop." The Santa Fe New Mexican opined that "it's not quite as crazy as Ass Pocket, it's still probably the wildest blues album of the year."

AllMusic praised Burnside's "stomping guitar, powerful voice and cheerfully vulgar lyrics."

== Track listing ==
No.	Title	Length
1.	"Over the Hill"
2.	"Alice Mae"
3.	"Georgia Women"
4.	"Snake Drive"
5.	"Rollin' & Tumblin'"
6.	"Out of the Road"
7.	"Highway 7"
8.	"Tribute to Fred"
9.	"You Gotta Move"
