= Booba Barnes =

American blues guitarist and vocalist (1936–1996)

- Born: Roosevelt Melvin Barnes; September 25, 1936; Longwood, Washington County, Mississippi, United States
- Died: April 2, 1996 (aged 59) Chicago, Illinois, United States
- Genres: Blues, Delta blues
- Instruments: Guitar, harmonica
- Years active: 1960–1996
- Label: Rooster Blues

Roosevelt Melvin "Booba" Barnes (September 25, 1936 – April 2, 1996) was an American Delta blues guitar player and vocalist. One commentator noted in 2003 that Barnes, R. L. Burnside, Big Jack Johnson, Paul "Wine" Jones and James "Super Chikan" Johnson were "present-day exponents of an edgier, electrified version of the raw, uncut Delta blues sound."

== Career ==
Born in Longwood, Washington County, Mississippi, United States, Barnes got his start in 1960 as a member of the Swinging Gold Coasters, a local Mississippi blues outfit. He relocated to Chicago in 1964, where he played in bars and clubs, but returned to Mississippi in 1971 and continued to perform locally into the early 1980s. In 1984, Barnes hooked up with Lil' Dave Thompson when the latter was aged 15, and the duo played on Mississippi's juke joint circuit. Barnes opened a nightclub, the Playboy Club, on Greenville's famed Nelson Street. He played there with a backing group called the Playboys and they became regional blues favorites. He eventually signed to Rooster Blues, who released Barnes's debut effort The Heartbroken Man in 1990.

The album was hailed by Allmusic as "an instant modern classic", and Guitar Player called Barnes "a wonderfully idiosyncratic guitar player and an extraordinary vocalist by any standard". The New York Times described Barnes as playing “unvarnished Delta blues… He was a showman who wore iridescent suits, duckwalked across the stage and picked his guitar with his teeth. But his knowing voice and spiky, syncopated electric guitar parts maintained a tradition of the blues as dance music, unflinching but resilient.”

Barnes appeared in the 1991 documentary Deep Blues: A Musical Pilgrimage to the Crossroads, featuring musicians from the North Mississippi hill country. He also contributed three tracks to the motion picture soundtrack.

Barnes toured the U.S. and Europe following the album’s release and subsequent increased visibility. However, Barnes's career was interrupted in the middle of the decade when he was diagnosed with lung cancer, and he died of the disease in April 1996 in Chicago, aged 59.

== Discography ==
- The Heartbroken Man (Rooster Blues, 1990)
- Deep Blues Motion Picture Soundtrack (Atlantic, 1992)
