= Rosa Lee Hill =

American musician (1910–1968)

Rosa Lee Hill (September 25, 1910 – October 22, 1968) was an American blues musician. She was born Rosa Lee Hemphill in Como, Mississippi, United States.

== Music career ==
Hill played music that was in the tradition of north Mississippi, singing acoustic blues that made use of a broody feeling and subtly varied repetition. Her song "Bullyin' Well", which was recorded by Alan Lomax, has been included on a number of releases over the years.

The daughter of Hill country blues musician Sid Hemphill, Rosa Lee learned guitar from her father and by the time she was ten, was playing dances with him. Several of her songs were recorded by Alan Lomax in 1959, including "Rolled and Tumbled." Hill and her husband were sharecroppers and lived in perpetual poverty; when their property burned down, they relocated to a tumbledown shack to live their remaining years.

Her album, Rosa Lee Hill and Friends, was part of Fat Possum's campaign to reissue the recordings made by George Mitchell. It included Hill's niece, Jessie Mae Hemphill, as well as Jim Bunkley, Catherine Porter, Will Shade, Essie Mae Brooks, Precious Bryant, and Lottie Kate.

== Death ==
Hill died in October 1968, aged 58, in Senatobia, Mississippi.
