= Evan Nicole Bell =

American singer-songwriter and musician (born 1997)

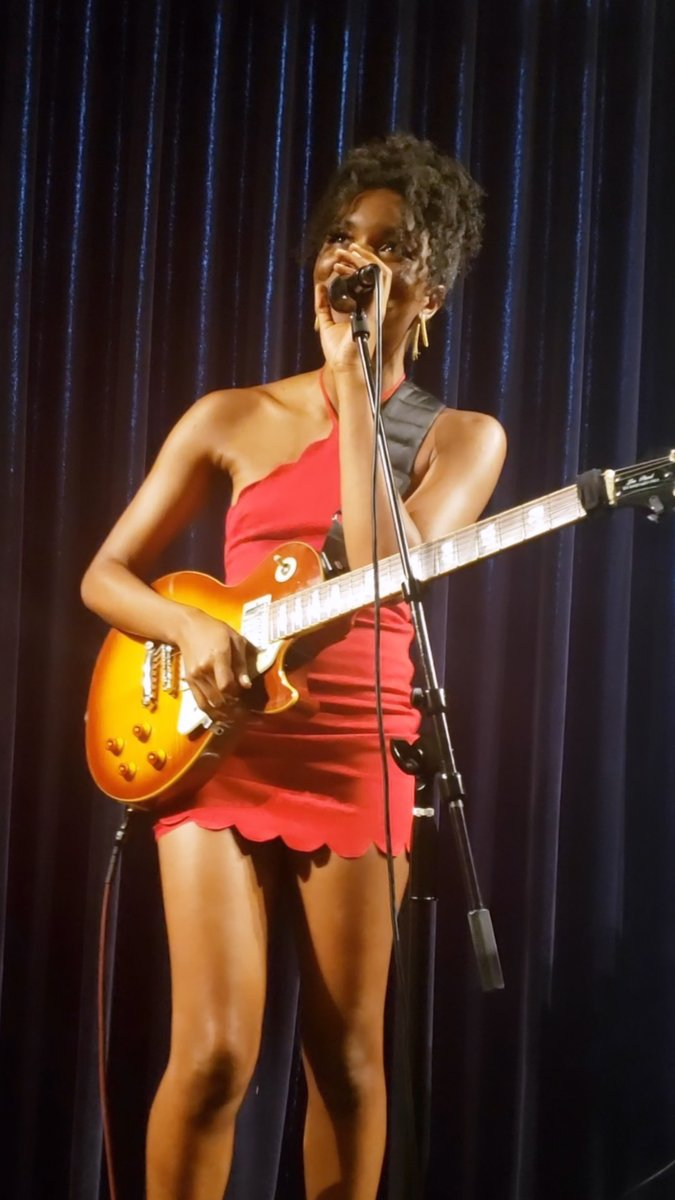
- Bell performing in 2022

Background information
- Born: Evan Nicole Bell; February 15, 1997 (age 29); Texas, U.S.
- Education: Duke University (BA)
- Genres: Americana; roots rock; blues rock; soul; folk
- Occupations: Singer; songwriter; guitarist; producer
- Instruments: Vocals; electric guitar; acoustic guitar; bass; piano; drums
- Years active: 2022–present
- Label: Hummingbird Records
- Website: evannicolebell.com

Evan Nicole Bell (born February 15, 1997) is an American singer-songwriter and musician whose music incorporates Americana, blues, rock, soul, and folk.

Bell gained attention in August 2022 following a viral X video showcasing her performing "Crosscut Saw" by Albert King. Her debut extended play (EP), Runaway Girl, was released in 2024, followed by her first studio album, Shades of Blue, in 2025, and her second studio album, Evan, in 2026. Both albums were written and produced by Bell.

== Life and career ==
=== Early life and education ===
Bell was born in Texas and grew up in Columbia, Maryland. She is a graduate of Duke University.

In an interview with Baltimore magazine, Bell described being raised in a household filled with Motown, soul, gospel, and funk music, citing artists such as Stevie Wonder, Isaac Hayes, The Isley Brothers, Michael Jackson, The Bar-Kays, and Teena Marie as formative influences.

She began playing acoustic and classical guitar at age 13 and took up electric guitar at age 21, when she was gifted an Epiphone Les Paul by her mother.

=== Career ===
==== 2021–2023: Online presence ====
In August 2021, Bell uploaded a video of herself covering "Crosscut Saw" by Albert King to YouTube and Facebook to participate in Play Music on the Porch Day. One year later, in July 2022, the video was shared by a Sweden-based blues account, where it received over 250,000 views, increasing Bell's Twitter following from 12 to 10,000.

Following her first viral moment, in October 2022, Bell was invited to perform a special Live Session for Public Radio Music Day by NPR Music member station WTMD, who called her "one of the most exciting newcomers on the Baltimore scene". She performed her original music and covers of songs by Koko Taylor and Tracy Chapman. Her performance was one of six chosen from hundreds across the nation to be featured on the front page of NPR Music.

==== 2024–present: Recording career ====
In January 2024, Bell released her debut EP, Runaway Girl. Her debut studio album, Shades of Blue, followed in January 2025. Singer-songwriter Todd Snider praised the album, stating "I got this album a week ago and have not stopped playing it. It’s like Prince meets Lightnin' Hopkins."

Later in 2025, Bell co-wrote and performed on the track "Feel Me Better" with G. Love & Special Sauce, providing vocals and electric guitar. The song was released as the lead single from the group’s album Ode to R.L., a tribute to blues musician R.L. Boyce. In October 2026, Bell released her second studio album, Evan.

== Music style and influences ==
In a call for papers on Langston Hughes’s Blues Vision in Ryan Coogler’s Sinners, scholar Tony Bolden included Bell among "contemporary artists exemplifying salient principles and values characteristic of blues music," alongside Christone "Kingfish" Ingram, Gary Clark Jr., Erykah Badu, Mary J. Blige, and KIRBY.

Bell is a mezzo-soprano. She has cited Jimi Hendrix as a musical influence.

== Discography ==
=== Albums ===
- Evan (2026)
- Shades of Blue (2025)

=== EPs ===
- Runaway Girl (2024)

=== Featured appearances ===
- "Feel Me Better" (with G. Love & Special Sauce, 2025)

== Personal life ==
Bell is a documentary photographer and has shown two exhibits of her work.
