= Mississippi Joe Callicott =

American blues musician (1899–1969)

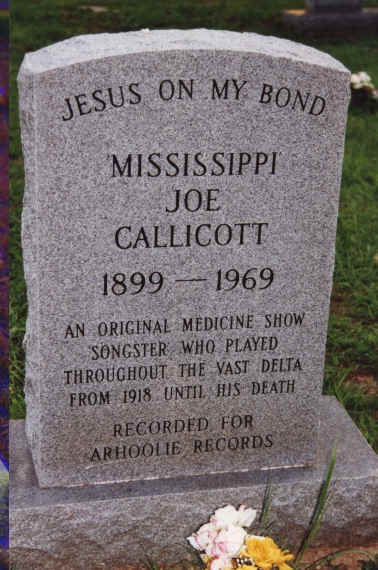
Grave of Joe Callicott

"Mississippi" Joe Callicott (October 10, 1899 – May 1969) was an American Delta blues singer and guitarist.

== Biography ==
=== Early career ===
Callicott was born in the small town of Nesbit, Mississippi, United States. In 1929, he played second guitar in Garfield Akers' duet recording, "Cottonfield Blues", and in 1930, he recorded "Fare Thee Well Blues" and "Traveling Mama Blues" for Brunswick Records. His "Love Me Baby Blues" has been covered by various artists–– for example, by Ry Cooder, under the title "France Chance".

=== Later years ===
He served as a mentor to the guitarist Kenny Brown when Brown was ten years old.

Some of Callicott's 1967 recordings, which were recorded by music historian George Mitchell, were released in LP format by Arhoolie Records in 1969. Additionally, some were re-released in 2003 on the Fat Possum record label.

Joe Callicott is buried in the Mount Olive Baptist Church Cemetery in his hometown of Nesbit. On April 29, 1995, a memorial headstone was placed on his grave, arranged by the Mount Zion Memorial Fund with the help of Kenny Brown and financed by Chris Strachwitz, Arhoolie Records, and John Fogerty. Callicott's original marker, a simple paving stone which read simply "JOE", was subsequently donated by his family to the Delta Blues Museum in Clarksdale, Mississippi. At the ceremony, the Mount Zion Memorial Fund presented Callicott's wife Doll with a check from Arhoolie Records for royalties earned from a CD reissue of Callicott's work.

== Discography ==
=== Studio albums ===
- Presenting the Country Blues (Blue Horizon, 1969)
- Mississippi Delta Blues Vol. 2 (Arhoolie, 1969 - side 2 only, side 1 by R. L. Burnside and Rosa Lee Hill)
- Deal Gone Down (Revival, 1970)

=== Compilation albums ===
- Ain't A Gonna Lie to You (Fat Possum, 2003)
- North Mississippi Blues (Southland, 2004)
