= Olga Wilhelmine Munding =

American singer-songwriter

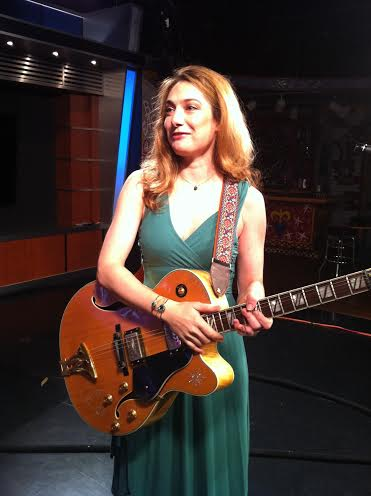

Background information
- Born: Olga Wilhelmine Munding; October 18, 1976 (age 49); San Francisco, California, United States
- Genres: Blues, country, pop
- Occupations: Actress, producer, singer
- Years active: 1990–present (actress); 1996–present (singer)
- Label: 219 Records
- Website: www.about.me/laolga

Olga Wilhelmine Munding (born October 18, 1976) is an American New Orleans–based blues musician, producer and actress.

== Early life and education ==
Munding was classically trained in music as a child. She went to the Nueva School for gifted children in Hillsborough, California, where she received a Yehudi Menuhin scholarship in classical piano, violin and music composition. She went into public school when her parents divorced and that began a long spiral downwards into "the blues", which finally culminated into hitting rock bottom with her divorce many years from Clarksdale-based Squirrel Nut Zippers musician James "Jimbo" Mathus. She studied drama and musical theater at San Mateo Performing Arts Center in San Mateo, California, and Judy Berlin's, Kids on Camera in San Francisco.

In college, she lived in Boulder, CO and hosted multiple radio shows at KGNU and produced a syndicated college show called Joes Blue Plate Special which aired on over 200 college stations and had a sponsorship with Doc Martin's. At the radio station, she hosted six regular local radio shows on KGNU Boulder/Denver Colorado, as well as ran the Community Calendar. In 2000, she was voted "the most alluring voice on the front range" by Best Of Boulder, Boulder Weekly newspaper.

== Career ==
=== Music ===
Munding is a blues vocalist and guitar player known for her sultry voice and Southern sound, performing and recording under the singular name Olga™. Munding first took interest in the blues, when she was in high school. She developed her signature style through an extended tutelage under the pioneering female blues musician Jessie Mae Hemphill. Munding and Hemphill recorded together extensively and participated together in Martin Scorsese’s The Blues.

Munding has released five albums on her label 219 Records, Now Is The Time, North Mississippi Christmas, Whatever You Want, Kiss Your Blues Away, and Blues Babe. In 2011, she released her fourth album "Whatever You Want", which was written with Cody Dickinson of the Grammy-nominated North Mississippi Allstars and mixed and produced by Emmy winning producer Winn McElroy.

She has played with Chris Isaak, Los Lobos, North Mississippi Allstars and co-engineered the Grammy nominated song, "Monkey to Man" by Elvis Costello.

She is also the founder and president of the Jessie Mae Hemphill Foundation, which honors the legendary and influential musician who served as her mentor and friend. The foundation supports, preserves, and archives the indigenous music of northern Mississippi and provides assistance for musicians in need from the region who could not survive on meager publishing royalties. This gained prominence in 2008 when Munding fought publicly with a popular musician Cat Power who has used but not credited a Hemphill song on one of her albums. On August 16, 2011, Munding was elected to the Blues Foundation's Board of Directors.

On February 3, 2012, Munding in association with the Jessie Mae Hemphill Foundation organized the “Hill Country Blues Celebration” in Como, Mississippi to celebrate the “Repatriation of Como, Mississippi Recordings, Photographs and Videos from the Alan Lomax Collection” and the loan of the Hill Country Blues Photography Collection from the Jessie Mae Hemphill (JMH) Foundation to the Emily Jones Pointer Library. Alan Lomax was an American folklorist and ethnomusicologist who traveled throughout the United States, Europe and the Caribbeans as part of his quest to record previously unrecorded and often overlooked folk music. Lomax visited the Como area during the 1950s and again in the 1970s. His recordings, photographs, and film from his time in Como comprise the collection presented to Como's Emily Jones Pointer Library. Lomax's recordings, film and photos are in the process of digitization and wider availability online.

She released her fifth album, a Christmas EP in 2012 called North Mississippi Christmas.

In 2023, Munding released a collection of demo songs from her early recording days called Blues Babe 23, a throwback to the title of her first album from 2003, Blues Babe. This was followed in 2024 with her first published book of songs and poetry titled Blues & Musings published by Covenant Books and coincides with a companion EP of the same title, consisting of songs in the book.

=== Acting ===
She has appeared in numerous television shows and movies. She acted, and co-produced in the short film, The Statue which not only screened in 36 different film festivals, it won the New Orleans Film Festival in 2010., and producing the Jessie Mae Hemphill & Friends documentary,"Dare You Do It Again". In 2016, Munding began audiobook narration.

== Filmography ==
Actress Roles in Films
Year	Film	Role	Notes
2010	Statue	Actress (Girl Musician)	Short film
2010	The Somnambulist	Actress (Nurse)	Thriller
2010	Red	Mary Louise Parker photo double	Action/ Comedy/ Crime
2011	Cutoff, LA	Actress (Alice)	Short/ Drama
2012	Django Unchained	Stand-in / violinist	Western
2012	The Courier	Actress (Doctor)	Action/ Crime/ Thriller
2013	Dawn of the Planet of the Apes	Stand-in	Action/ Fantasy
2014	Gone	Actress (Mysterious Traveller)	Short, Mystery
2014	Devil's Due	Actress (Violinist)	Horror
2014	13 Sins	Actress (Pianist)	Horror/ Thriller
2014	Bad Country	Actress (Waitress)	Crime/ Drama
2015	Bullets at the Ballet	Actress (Mdme. Krakatov)	Action, Short film
2015	Paranormal Abduction	Actress (Nurse)	Thriller
2015	Bad Ass 3: Bad Asses on the Bayou	Actress (Violinist)	Action, Drama
2015	Focus	Actress (Nicky's Crew)	Comedy, Crime, Drama
2015	Runaway Hearts	Actress (Drug Buyer 2)	Drama, Family
2016	10 Cloverfield Lane	Stunt and photo double for Mary Elizabeth Winstead	Thriller
2017	Vore	Nina (lead)	Drama
2020	Night Teeth	Stunts	Netflix drama
2023	The Boogeyman	Stunt double for Marin Ireland	Thriller

Actress Roles in Television
Year	Title	Role	Notes
2010	Treme	Actress (Mardi Gras Muse)	1 episode
2015	Scream Queens	Actress and Stunts (Lady Red Devil)	4 episodes
2016	Salem	Actress and Stunts (Female Refugee)	1 episode
2018	NCIS: New Orleans	Actress (Helo EMT)	1 episode
2021	Blood Relative	Stunt double for Melissa Leo	pilot
2022	Leverage: Redemption S2	Stunt double for Jackie Goldston and Taylor Shurte	2 episodes
2023	Secrets of Sulphur Springs	Stunt double for Kelly Frye	1 episode

== Discography ==
- Blues Babe (2003)
- Kiss Your Blues Away (2004)
- Now is the Time (2006)
- Whatever You Want (2011)
- North Mississippi Christmas (2012)
- Blues Babe 23 (2023)
- Blues & Musings (2024)

== Awards ==
Best Short Film 2010 Statue at the New Orleans Film Festival.

Best Original Song 2012 ("Loving You is All I Know" from Statue) at Treasure Coast International Film Festival.

Best Film, for movie Statue at Brainwash Film Festival in 2012

Best of the Fest, for Statue at Short Sweet Film Fest in 2013

Best Louisiana Film, for Vore at New Orleans Horror Film Festival 2017

=== Prominent positions held ===
In August 2015, Munding was elected as Local Board Member (New Orleans) of Screen Actors Guild - American Federation of Television and Radio Artists and elected in 2019 to the National Board. From 2011 to 2014, she served on the Blues Foundation's Board of Directors.

In mid-2020, Munding began a quest to search for fellow performers' unclaimed residuals held in trust by SAG-AFTRA by using social media to assist in searching for performers or their estates to locate them.
