= Hill Country Love =

Studio album by Cedric Burnside
- Released: April 5, 2024
- Genre: Blues
- Label: Provogue
- Producer: Cedric Burnside; Luther Dickinson

Cedric Burnside chronology
I Be Trying (2021)	Hill Country Love (2024)

Professional ratings
Review scores
Source	Rating
laut.de	4/5 stars
Spectrum Culture	77/100%
Uncut	4/5 stars

Hill Country Love is the third solo studio album by American musician Cedric Burnside. It was released on April 5, 2024, through Provogue Records. Produced by Burnside himself together with Luther Dickinson, it features contributions from the latter, Artemus Le-Sueur and Patrick Williams. At the 67th Annual Grammy Awards, the album received a nomination for Grammy Award for Best Traditional Blues Album, but lost to the Taj Mahal Sextet's Swingin' Live at the Church in Tulsa.

== Track listing ==
No.	Title	Writer(s)	Length
1.	"I Know"	Cedric Burnside
2.	"Hill Country Love"	C. Burnside
3.	"Shake Em on Down"	Fred McDowell
4.	"Juke Joint"	C. Burnside
5.	"Smile"	C. Burnside
6.	"Closer"	C. Burnside
7.	"Coming Real to Ya"	C. Burnside
8.	"Thank You"	C. Burnside
9.	"Love Your Music"	C. Burnside
10.	"Toll on They Life"	C. Burnside
11.	"You Got to Move"	McDowell; Gary Davis
12.	"Strong"	C. Burnside
13.	"Funky"	C. Burnside
14.	"Po Black Mattie"	Robert Burnside

== Personnel ==
- Cedric Burnside — vocals, guitar, baritone guitar, producer, mixing
- Luther Dickinson — slide guitar, bass guitar, producer, mixing
- Artemus Le-Sueur — drums
- Patrick Williams — harmonica
- Kevin Houston — recording
- Ted Jensen — mastering
- Roy Koch — artwork
- Jim Arbogast — photography

== Charts ==
Chart (2024)	Peak position
UK Americana Albums (OCC)	28
UK Jazz & Blues Albums (OCC)	3
US Top Blues Albums (Billboard)	8
