= I Be Trying =

Studio album by Cedric Burnside
- Released: June 25, 2021
- Studios: Royal Studios (Memphis, Tennessee); Single Lock Studios (Florence, Alabama)
- Genre: Blues
- Length: 47:07
- Label: Single Lock
- Producer: Lawrence "Boo" Mitchell

Cedric Burnside chronology
Benton County Relic (2018)	I Be Trying (2021)	Hill Country Love (2024)

Professional ratings
Review scores
Source	Rating
American Songwriter	4/5 stars
Classic Rock	8/10 marks
Mojo	4/5 stars
Rolling Stone	4/5 stars
Spectrum Culture	3.5/5
Uncut	8/10

I Be Trying is the second solo studio album by American musician Cedric Burnside. It was released on June 25, 2021, via Single Lock Records, making it his second and final studio album for the label. It was recorded at Royal Studios in Memphis with additional recording taking place at Single Lock Studios in Florence. Produced by Lawrence "Boo" Mitchell, it features contributions from Portrika Burnside, Luther Dickinson, Zac Cockrell, Reed Watson and Caleb Elliott.

The album was announced as the winner of the Grammy Award for Best Traditional Blues Album at the 64th Annual Grammy Awards held on April 3, 2022.

== Track listing ==
All tracks are written by Cedric Burnside, except track 10 is written by R. L. Burnside and track 11 is written by David Kimbrough.

No.	Title	Length
1.	"The World Can Be So Cold"	3:26
2.	"Step In"	2:35
3.	"I Be Trying"	3:32
4.	"You Really Love Me"	4:15
5.	"Love Is the Key"	3:10
6.	"Keep on Pushing"	3:06
7.	"Gotta Look Out"	3:28
8.	"Pretty Flowers"	2:51
9.	"What Makes Me Think"	4:29
10.	"Bird Without a Feather"	3:31
11.	"Hands Off That Girl"	5:35
12.	"Get Down"	3:27
13.	"Love You Forever"	3:42
Total length:		47:07

== Personnel ==
- Cedric Burnside — songwriting (tracks: 1–9, 12, 13), vocals, guitar, drums (tracks: 2, 4–7, 12)
- R.L. Burnside — songwriting (track 10)
- David "Junior" Kimbrough — songwriting (track 10)
- Portrika Burnside — vocals (track 3)
- Luther Dickinson — guitar (tracks: 2, 6)
- Zac Cockrell — bass (track 8)
- Reed Watson — drums & percussion (tracks: 3, 5, 7–9, 11, 13)
- Caleb Elliott — cello (tracks: 3, 13)
- Lawrence "Boo" Mitchell — producer, engineering, mixing
- Ben Tanner — associate producer, engineering assistant
- Dale Gunnoe — photography
- Abraham Rowe — additional photography
- Joshua Hardman — design

== Charts ==
Chart (2021)	Peak position
UK Americana Albums (Official Charts)	22
UK Jazz & Blues Albums (Official Charts)	13
US Top Blues Albums (Billboard)	2
