= A Ass Pocket of Whiskey =

Studio album by R. L. Burnside and the Jon Spencer Blues Explosion
- Released: June 18, 1996
- Recorded: February 6, 1996
- Studio: Lunati Farms (Holly Springs, Mississippi)
- Genre: Blues
- Length: 41:28
- Label: Matador
- Producer: Matthew Johnson

R. L. Burnside chronology
Too Bad Jim (1994)	A Ass Pocket of Whiskey (1996)	Mr. Wizard (1997)

the Jon Spencer Blues Explosion chronology
Orange (1994)	A Ass Pocket of Whiskey (1996)	Now I Got Worry (1996)

Professional ratings
Review scores
Source	Rating
AllMusic	4/5 stars
The Encyclopedia of Popular Music	4/5 stars
The Penguin Guide to Blues Recordings	3.5/4 stars
The Penguin Guide to Blues Recordings	1/4 stars
Pitchfork	7.7/10
Rolling Stone	2/5 stars
The Rolling Stone Album Guide	4/5 stars

A Ass Pocket of Whiskey is the seventh studio album by the American hill country blues musician R. L. Burnside, recorded in conjunction with the Jon Spencer Blues Explosion. It was released on June 18, 1996, through Matador Records. Unusually, The Penguin Guide to Blues Recordings gave the album two contrasting ratings, indicating divided critical opinion.

== Track listing ==
All songs by R.L. Burnside, Jon Spencer, Judah Bauer and Russell Simins (except where otherwise noted).

1. "Goin' Down South"
2. "Boogie Chillen" (John Lee Hooker)
3. "Poor Boy"
4. "2 Brothers"
5. "Snake Drive" (Burnside)
6. "Shake 'Em On Down" (Bukka White (although the album credits the song to 'Burnside')
7. "Criminal Inside Me"
8. "Walkin' Blues" (Son House (although the album credits the song to 'Burnside')
9. "Tojo Told Hitler"
10. "Have You Ever Been Lonely?"

== Personnel ==
- R.L. Burnside - vocals, guitar
- Kenny Brown - guitar
- Judah Bauer - guitar, harmonica, vocals, Casio SK-1
- Russell Simins - drums
- Jon Spencer - guitar, vocals, drums, theremin
