= Pucker Up Buttercup =

Studio album by Paul Jones
- Released: 1999
- Genre: Blues
- Length: 35:02
- Label: Fat Possum
- Producers: Matthew Johnson, Bruce Watson

Paul Jones chronology
Mule (1995)	Pucker Up Buttercup (1999)	Stop Arguing Over Me (2006)

Pucker Up Buttercup is an album by the American musician Paul Jones, released in 1999. Jones supported the album by touring with T-Model Ford and other Fat Possum musicians.

== Production ==
Jones had gone back to welding and construction jobs after the release of his debut album, and was encouraged to play again by Ford. The album was coproduced by label head Matthew Johnson. Jones decided to drop his nickname, "Wine", for the release. He was backed by his drummer, Pickle. Jones preferred cheap amplifiers and made use of heavy distortion. "Lead Me On" is a version of a traditional spiritual.

== Critical reception ==
Professional ratings
Review scores
Source	Rating
AllMusic	3/5 stars
The Commercial Appeal	3/4 stars
The Penguin Guide to Blues Recordings	1.5/4 stars
Winnipeg Sun	4/5 stars

The Commercial Appeal opined that "the Fat Possum roster is hip enough without being post-modern poster children for Jon Spencer fans... Still, Jones has some standout if quizzical moments, especially the acoustic jiggle of 'Hard Way to Go' and a voice-and-drums only version of the hymn 'Lead Me On'." The Chicago Tribune noted that some tracks "have the intuitive sophistication of [Muddy] Waters' greatest bands: On 'Goin' Back Home', Jones wraps his rusty-razor riffs around a bass line as smooth and fast as the greatest garage rock."

The Tallahassee Democrat called the album "juke-joint downhome blues ... so real and raw it could raise blisters on your eardrums." The Albuquerque Journal said that "Jones' voice has a deep molasses richness to it that cuts much deeper than most of his peers." The New Times Broward-Palm Beach deemed it "a ragged masterpiece, a rural barnburner that rocks with wicked ferocity". The Lexington Herald-Leader wrote that Jones "has designed one of the most jagged country-blues sounds imaginable." Tucson Weekly included Pucker Up Buttercup on its list of the best albums of 1999.

== Track listing ==
No.	Title	Length
1.	"Roll That Woman"	3:02
2.	"Goin' Back Home"	2:29
3.	"Pucker Up Buttercup"	3:53
4.	"Hangin' with the Boys"	4:13
5.	"Lead Me On"	2:20
6.	"Don't Laugh at Me"	4:32
7.	"I'm Gonna Leave"	2:28
8.	"Dee Dee Dee"	3:16
9.	"Hard Way to Go"	2:58
10.	"Instrumental #99"	1:44
11.	"Further On Up the Road"	2:32
12.	"Guess I Just Fucked It All Up"	1:35
Total length:		35:02
