= A Bothered Mind =

Studio album by R. L. Burnside
- Released: August 17, 2004
- Genre: Blues
- Length: 39:24
- Label: Fat Possum
- Producer: Martin Tino Gross, Matthew Johnson, Tom Shimura, Bruce Watson

R. L. Burnside chronology
Wish I Was in Heaven Sitting Down (2000)	A Bothered Mind (2004)

Professional ratings
Review scores
Source	Rating
AllMusic	4/5 stars
The Guardian	(favourable)

A Bothered Mind is the thirteenth and final studio album from American blues musician R. L. Burnside. It was the last release from the musician prior to his death in 2005.

Following a heart attack in 2001, Burnside ceased to drink alcohol at a doctor's request. Following this, he had difficulty playing music, stating he felt like he had to learn all over again. As such, much of A Bothered Mind used older recordings of Burnside playing the guitar. When asked in 2003 to share his thoughts on previous albums that Fat Possum had remixed and released on his behalf, he replied "At first I didn't like them too much, then I saw how much money they were making and I got to liking them pretty well".

== Track listing ==
All tracks written by R. L. Burnside, except where noted.

No.	Title	Writer(s)	Length
1.	"Detroit Boogie, Pt 1"		0:38
2.	"See What My Buddy Done"		2:57
3.	"Shake 'Em On Down"		3:29
4.	"Goin' Down South" (featuring Lyrics Born)		3:11
5.	"My Name Is Robert Too" (featuring Kid Rock)	R. L. Burnside; Robert James Ritchie	2:43
6.	"Someday Baby" (featuring Lyrics Born)		3:16
7.	"Go to Jail"		2:43
8.	"Bird Without a Feather"		3:09
9.	"Glory Be"		4:37
10.	"Goin' Away Baby"		3:17
11.	"Rollin' and Tumblin'"	Traditional	3:50
12.	"Stole My Check"		2:42
13.	"Detroit Boogie, Pt 2"		2:52
Total length:			39:24

== Personnel ==
Musicians

- R. L. Burnside - Composer, guitar, vocals
- Jimmy Bones - Harmonica, harp, keyboards, piano
- Kenny Brown - Guitar, slide guitar
- Cedric Burnside - Drums
- John Scott Evans - Saxophone
- Martin Gross - Drums, Guitar, Mixing, Producing
- Mike Hollis - Bass guitar
- Kid Rock - Vocals
- Lyrics Born - Vocals, various instruments
- Kenny Olson - Guitar, bass guitar
- Mike Smith - Guitar, bass guitar

Production

- Matthew Johnson - Producer
- Bruce Watson - Producer, mixing
- Tom Shimura - Producer, arrangements
- George Mitchell - Engineer
- Mike E. Clark - Mixing
- Scott Sumner - Mixing
- Mark Yoshida - Mastering

== Charts ==
Chart	Peak position
ARIA Top 100 Albums	7
US Billboard Blues Albums	6
