= Sun Ra: A Joyful Noise =

1980 music documentary

Sun Ra: A Joyful Noise is a 1980 jazz film by Robert Mugge documenting performances by Sun Ra and his Arkestra in Philadelphia, Washington D.C., and Baltimore, and also including interviews and rehearsal footage. The Philadelphia performances captured by the film took place at Danny's Hollywood Palace and on the rooftop of the Philadelphia International Center. The Baltimore performance took place in the Famous Ballroom, hosted by the Left Bank Jazz Society.

Sun Ra compositions featured in the film include "Astro Black," "Along Came Ra," "We Travel the Spaceways," and "Requiem for Trevor Johnson (Discipline 27)."

In 2001, the film was screened as part of Maryland Film Festival in the former Famous Ballroom, now part of the expanded Charles Theatre, where the film's Baltimore performances were shot.
