= Deep Blues: A Musical Pilgrimage to the Crossroads =

- Directed by: Robert Mugge
- Written by: Robert Palmer
- Starring: Roosevelt Barnes; R. L. Burnside; Jessie Mae Hemphill; Big Jack Johnson; Junior Kimbrough; Booker T. Laury; Jack Owens; Lonnie Pitchford; Bud Spires
- Cinematography: Erich Roland
- Edited by: Robert Mugge
- Distributed by: Tara Releasing
- Release date: 1 April 1992
- Running time: 91 minutes
- Country: United Kingdom
- Language: English

Deep Blues: A Musical Pilgrimage to the Crossroads is a British documentary film, released in 1991, and made by music critic and author Robert Palmer and documentary film maker Robert Mugge, in collaboration with David A. Stewart and his brother John J. Stewart. The film provided insight into the location, cast and characteristics of Delta blues and North Mississippi hill country blues. Filming took place in 1990 in Memphis, Tennessee, and various North Mississippi counties. Theatrical release was in 1991 and home video release in the United Kingdom, the next year, as was a soundtrack album. A United States consumer edition came in 2000.

Stewart initiated and financed the project, inspired by Palmer's 1981 book of the same name. Palmer provided many of the insights into the background and history of the blues, as a guide to Stewart and the film narrator.

== Musicians ==
Musicians appearing in the film are: Roosevelt Barnes, R. L. Burnside, Jessie Mae Hemphill (with Napoleon Strickland and Abe Young), Big Jack Johnson, Junior Kimbrough (with Little Joe Ayers and Calvin Jackson), Booker T. Laury, Jack Owens, Lonnie Pitchford, Bud Spires and Wade Walton, The film revitalized the recording career of some of the musicians.
