= High Water Recording Company =

High Water Recording Company is an American blues record label, founded in 1979 by David Evans and Memphis State University.. It was established with support from a National Endowment for the Arts grant. The label’s mission was to document and preserve authentic local music that was being overlooked by bigger labels.

The label initially only issued singles. From 1983 onwards, it released LPs of recordings by blues and gospel musicians from the Memphis area produced by Evans. Almost all recordings since 1997 were re-released on Hightone Records. In 2008, HighTone was bought by Shout! Factory, which has continued to keep some releases available.

== Discography ==
=== Singles ===
- 408 Raymond Hill / Lillie Hill
- 409 Jessie Mae Hemphill
- 410 R. L. Burnside and the Sound Machine
- 411 Ranie Burnette
- 412 The Fieldstones
- 413 The Fieldstones
- 414 The Jubirt Sisters
- 415 Little Applewhite
- 416 Hammie Nixon
- 417 The Hollywood All Stars
- 418 Junior Kimbrough And the Soul Blues Boys
- 419 The Harmonizers
- 420 The Gospel Writers
- 421 Hezekiah and the House Rockers
- 422 Little Applewhite
- 423 Uncle Ben and his Nephews
- 424 Waynell Jones
- 425 Jessie Mae Hemphill
- 426 Huebert Crawford and the King Riders Band

=== LPs ===
- 1001 The Fieldstones
- 1002 Happy in the Service of the Lord (various)
- 1003 Hammie Nixon
- 1004 The Pattersonaires
- 1005 Spirit of Memphis Quartet
- 1006 The Blues Busters
- 1007 Forth
- 1008 The Jubirt Sisters
- 1009 The Hollywood All Stars
- 1010 Chicago Bob and the Shadows
- 1011 Hezekiah and the House Rockers
- 1012 Jessie Mae Hemphill
- ???? Southern Comfort – First Concert Jazz Ensemble of Memphis State University
- ???? The Jazz Ensembles of Memphis State University

=== CDs (HighTone) ===
- HMG 6501 R. L. Burnside: Sound Machine Groove
- HMG 6502 Jessie Mae Hemphill: Feelin' Good
- HMG 6503 Junior Kimbrough: Do the Rump!
- HMG 6504 The Pattersonaires: Why Not Try My God
- HMG 6505 The Fieldstones: Memphis Blues Today!
- HMG 6506 Chicago Bob and the Shadows: Just Your Fool
- HMG 6507 Spirit of Memphis Quartet: Traveling On
- HMG 6508 Jessie Mae Hemphill: She-Wolf
- HMG 6509 Hammie Nixon: Tappin' That Thing
- HMG 6510 The Harps of Melody: Sing and Make Melody Unto the Lord
- HMG 6511 Hezekiah and the House Rockers: Going to California
- HMG 6512 The Blues Busters: Busted
- HMG 6513 V.A.: Deep South Blues
- HMG 6514 The Pattersonaires: Book of the Seven Seals
- HMG 6515 The Jubirt Sisters: Ladies Sing the Blues
- HMG 6516 V.A.: Happy in the Service of the Lord Volume 1
- HMG 6517 V.A.: Happy in the Service of the Lord Volume 2
- HMG 6518 The Hollywood All Stars: Hard Hitting Blues from Memphis
- HMG 6519 The Fieldstones: Mud Island Blues
- HMG 6520 V.A.: Memphis Blues Bands and Singers: the 1980s
