= Harmontown, Mississippi =

Unincorporated community in Mississippi, US

- Unincorporated community
- Location within Mississippi Location within the United States
- Coordinates: 34°32′25″N 89°38′54″W
- Country: United States
- State: Mississippi
- County: Lafayette
- Elevation: 404 ft (123 m)
- Time zone: UTC-6 (Central (CST))
  - Summer (DST): UTC-5 (CDT)
- Area code: 662
- GNIS feature ID: 670925

Harmontown is an unincorporated community in Lafayette County, Mississippi. A post office operated under the name Harmonton from 1879 to 1914. In 1900, Harmontown had a population of 75.

The Lafayette County Fire Department and Lafayette County Sheriff's Office are responsible for fire and police service.

== Notable people ==
- R.L. Burnside, blues singer, songwriter, and guitarist
