= Chicago Bob Nelson =

American blues harmonica player and singer (1944–2013)

- Born: Robert Lee Nelson; July 4, 1944; Bogalusa, Louisiana, United States
- Died: January 17, 2013 (aged 68)
- Genres: Chicago blues
- Occupation(s): Harmonicist, singer, songwriter
- Instrument: Harmonica
- Years active: Late 1950s–2013
- Labels: HMG, King Snake and others

"Chicago" Bob Nelson (July 4, 1944 – January 17, 2013) was an American blues musician.

"Chicago" Bob Nelson was a harmonica player and singer who is known for amalgamating Louisiana and Chicago blues styles. He was singular in being mentored by traditional rural southern blues harmonica practitioners and melding their approach with urban Chicago playing, thus creating his own distinctive sound.

== Life and career ==
Robert Lee Nelson was born in Bogalusa, Louisiana, United States. His was a musical family. Bob's father, Versie Nelson, played upright bass and harmonica. From an early age Bob accompanied Versie to house parties, backyard barbecues and Saturday night fish fries around Bogalusa where cajun music, zydeco and blues were performed. Nelson recalled, "It was just people eating, jamming and having a good time!" Nelson began playing the harmonica at the age of eight. As a youngster he was encouraged and instructed by Versie's musical cohorts, Louisiana blues musicians (and Excello recording artists) Slim Harpo and Lazy Lester. Nelson credited Harpo, Lester, Sonny Boy Williamson II and Jimmy Reed (all of whom he knew) as his primary influences, as well as Sonny Boy Williamson I whose recordings he studied. Through listening to these artists, Nelson learned to use his instrument as a "second voice" to interpret and elucidate the emotion and themes of a song. Trips to Chicago to visit family were a major part of Nelson's childhood.

By the early 1960s he had taken up residence in Chicago. There he met and performed with Howlin' Wolf, Buddy Guy, Junior Wells, Earl Hooker and Muddy Waters. The latter, having run into Nelson at nearly every blues venue in Chicago, bestowed upon him the moniker that continues to identify him today. Nelson later performed with Muddy Waters at the Newport Folk Festival. Throughout his career Nelson toured with Luther "Georgia Boy" Johnson, Tinsley Ellis and John Lee Hooker.

Nelson died on January 17, 2013.

== Discography ==
- The Heart Fixers – (with Tinsley Ellis and the Heart Fixers) Southland Records
- Live at the Moonshadow – (with Tinsley Ellis and the Heart Fixers) Landslide Records
- Just Your Fool (1988) – HMG
- Comin' Back Strong – Erwin Music
- Hit and Run Lover (1992) – King Snake Records
- Back to Bogalusa (1996) – King Snake Records
- Keep What I Got (1993) – Planisphare
- Flyin' Too High (2006 compilation) – 95 North Records

== See also ==
- Tinsley Ellis – In 1981 he formed The Heartfixers, with Chicago Bob Nelson.
