= Cedric Burnside =

American blues musician and songwriter

- Born: Cedric O. Burnside; August 26, 1978 (age 48); Memphis, Tennessee, U.S.
- Genres: Electric blues Hill country blues
- Occupations: Musician, singer, songwriter
- Instruments: Drums, guitar, vocals
- Years active: 1991–present
- Label: Single Lock Records

Cedric O. Burnside (born August 26, 1978) is an American electric blues guitarist, drummer, singer and songwriter. He is the son of blues drummer Calvin Jackson and grandson of blues singer, songwriter, and guitarist R. L. Burnside.

Amongst many others, Burnside has played drums, either live or on record, with R. L. Burnside, Jessie Mae Hemphill, John Hermann, Kenny Brown, Richard Johnston, Jimmy Buffett, T-Model Ford, Paul "Wine" Jones, Widespread Panic, Afrissippi, and the Jon Spencer Blues Explosion.

== Early life and education ==
Burnside was born in Memphis, Tennessee, United States, to Calvin Jackson and Linda Burnside, and raised in Holly Springs, Mississippi, in the house of his grandfather, R. L. Burnside, and the extended family. By the age of 13, he began to tour with his grandfather's band, as a drummer. He had overlapped his father's time in the band, and would eventually replace him on the drums.

== Career ==
In 2002, Burnside played on Richard Johnston's debut album, Foot Hill Stomp. Burnside followed this two years later by playing percussion on Johnston's Official Bootleg #1 album.

A short-term partnership of Cedric with Garry Burnside (his uncle two years elder) in 2006, saw them record The Record, billed as Burnside Exploration. They had tour dates as opening act and jam partners for Widespread Panic.

Later in 2006 in Clarksdale, Mississippi, Burnside teamed up with Lightnin' Malcolm, and they both toured and recorded the Juke Joint Duo album. In 2008 they released Two Man Wrecking Crew, on which Jason Ricci played harmonica and Etta Britt performed backing vocals. It won a Blues Music Award for 'Best New Artist Debut' in 2009. The duo also toured with the Big Head Blues Club, a collaboration which led to them jointly recording the album, 100 Years Of Robert Johnson in 2011, to mark the centennial of the birth of Robert Johnson.

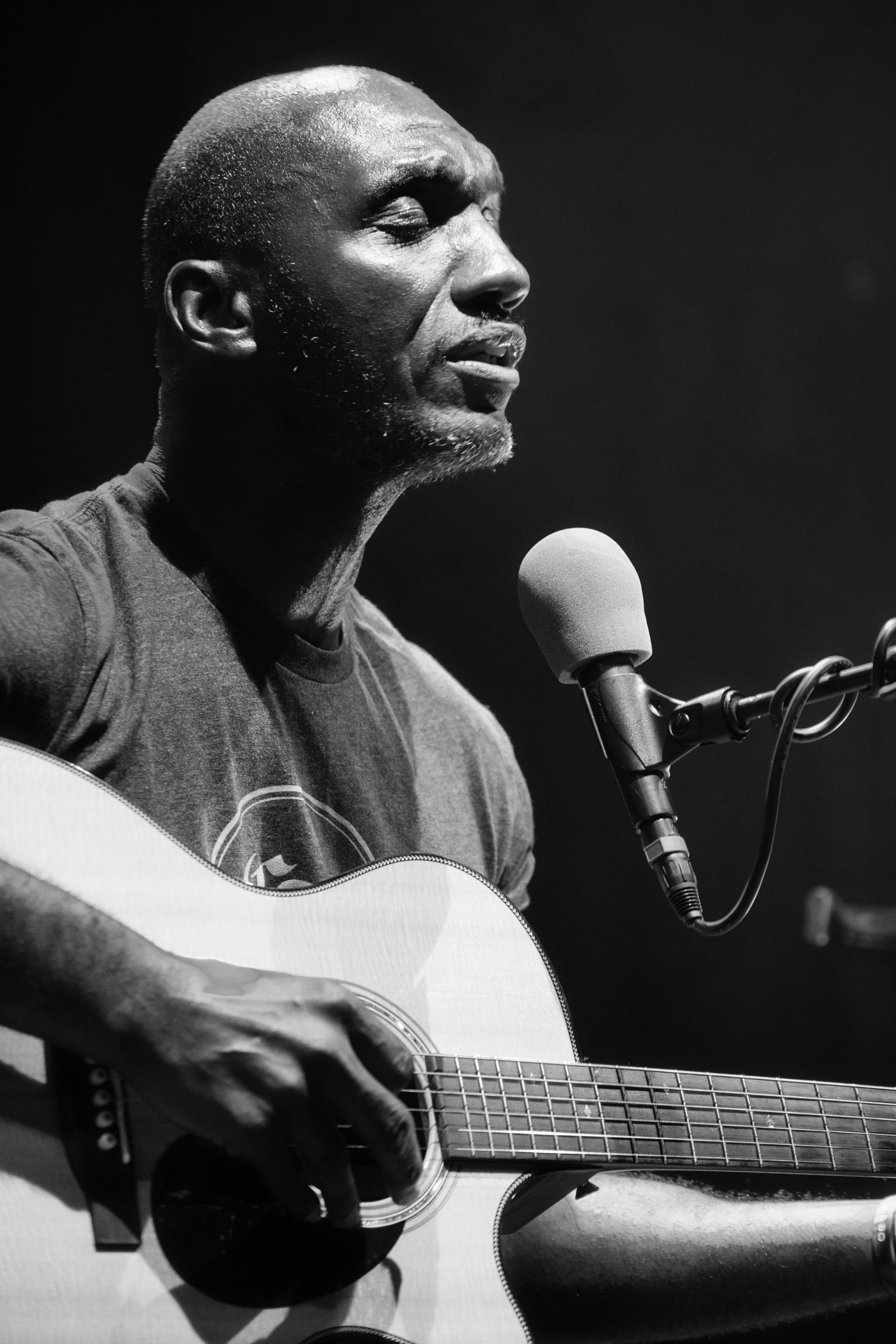
Burnside at INNtöne Jazzfestival, 2024

Another collaboration followed, this time with his younger sibling, Cody Burnside, plus his uncle, Garry Burnside, which created the Cedric Burnside Project. From 2011 he recorded and toured with Trenton Ayers. In 2011, The Way I Am album was released. Burnside's brother, Cody, died in 2012, and their father followed in 2015.

In late 2012 he recorded the album Allison Burnside Express with Bernard Allison, released in 2014.

Burnside's 2013's Hear Me When I Say, and the later Descendants of Hill Country (2015), were issued under the Cedric Burnside Project name and using the guitar playing of Ayers. The latter was funded using a Kickstarter campaign.

Burnside has had cameo appearances in three films – Tempted and Big Bad Love (both 2001), and Black Snake Moan (2006).

Burnside has performed with Lightnin' Malcolm at Roots N Blues N BBQ Festival (2008), Memphis in May, Notodden Blues Festival (both 2009), and Voodoo Experience (2010).

In 2018 he released the album Benton County Relic, which he recorded with Brian Jay of Pimps of Joytime. Benton County Relic was nominated for Best Traditional Blues Album at the 61st Annual Grammy Awards in 2019.

== Awards and honors ==
In 2013, Burnside won the Memphis Blues Award as 'Drummer of the Year' for the third time.

Burnside won his fourth overall, and third consecutive Blues Music Award in May 2014, in the category of 'Instrumentalist - Drums'. He won the award again in 2019, and 2020.

The album Descendants of Hill Country, was nominated for a Grammy Award in 2016 for Best Blues Album.

Benton County Relic was nominated for Best Traditional Blues Album at the 61st Annual Grammy Awards in 2019.

He is a recipient of a 2021 National Heritage Fellowship awarded by the National Endowment for the Arts, which is the United States government's highest honor in the folk and traditional arts.

For his album I Be Trying, Burnside won the Best Traditional Blues Album at the 64th Annual Grammy Awards in 2022.

Hill Country Love was nominated for a 2025 Grammy Award for Best Traditional Blues Album and a Libera Award for Blues Record.

== Discography ==
Year	Title	Record label	Accreditation
2001	Burnside On Burnside	Fat Possum Records	R.L. Burnside and Cedric Burnside
2006	The Record	Harvest Media Group	Burnside Exploration
2007	Juke Joint Duo	Soul Is Cheap	Cedric Burnside and Lightnin' Malcolm
2008	Two Man Wrecking Crew	Delta Groove Productions	Cedric Burnside and Lightnin' Malcolm
2011	The Way I Am	CD Baby	Cedric Burnside Project
2013	Hear Me When I Say	CD Baby	Cedric Burnside Project
2014	Allison Burnside Express	Jazzhaus	Cedric Burnside and Bernard Allison
2015	Descendants of Hill Country	Cedric Burnside Project	Cedric Burnside Project
2018	Benton County Relic	Single Lock Records	Cedric Burnside
2021	I Be Trying	Single Lock Records	Cedric Burnside
2024	Hill Country Love	Provogue Records	Cedric Burnside

== See also ==
- List of electric blues musicians

== External links and further reading ==
- Official Website
- 2014 interview with Burnside
- Extended discography at CD Universe
- "Interview. Matthew Joseph with Cedric Burnside and Lightnin' Malcolm, musicians". Clio.lib.olemiss.edu. Archived from the original on December 17, 2014.
- "Mississippi Hill Country Blues, The Next Generation", Living Blues. Issue 189, April 2007.
- Cedric Burnside coverage by WXPN Mississippi Blues Project
- Cedric Burnside at AllMusic
- Cedric Burnside at IMDb
