= Paul "Wine" Jones =

American blues guitarist and singer (1946–2005)

- Born: July 1, 1946; Flora, Mississippi, United States
- Died: October 9, 2005 (aged 59) Jackson, Mississippi, United States
- Genres: Electric blues, delta blues, contemporary blues
- Occupations: Singer, guitarist
- Instruments: Vocals, guitar
- Years active: 1990s–2005
- Label: Fat Possum

Paul "Wine" Jones (July 1, 1946 – October 9, 2005) was an American contemporary blues guitarist and singer.

Music writer Paul Du Noyer noted that Jones, R. L. Burnside, Big Jack Johnson, Roosevelt "Booba" Barnes and James "Super Chikan" Johnson were "present-day exponents of an edgier, electrified version of the raw, uncut Delta blues sound".

== Biography ==
Jones was born in Flora, Mississippi, and learned to play guitar by the age of four. In his teens he played at house parties, and later worked with James "Son" Thomas and harmonica player Little Willy Foster. Jones played music mainly as a pastime. He worked with local musicians while working on farms up to 1971, when he became a welder in Belzoni, Mississippi.

In 1995 and 1996, Jones performed outside of Mississippi, when he was a member of Fat Possum's "Mississippi Juke Joint Caravan". His 1995 debut album, Mule, was produced by the music critic Robert Palmer. On the album he was accompanied by drummer Sam Carr, and guitarist Big Jack Johnson. Fat Possum (an independent record label in Oxford, Mississippi), as well as managing the latter careers of Junior Kimbrough and R. L. Burnside, gave opportunity to a number of amateurs, mostly from rural Mississippi, who had seldom or never recorded before. Some, such as T-Model Ford and Asie Payton, moved on to higher billing, but others such as Jones, were left on the sidelines.

Jones died of cancer, at the age of 59, in Jackson, Mississippi, in October 2005.

== Discography ==
- Mule (1995) - Fat Possum
- Pucker Up Buttercup (1999) - Fat Possum
- Stop Arguing Over Me (2006) - Fat Possum
