= David Evans (musicologist) =

American ethnomusicologist (born 1944)

- Born: January 22, 1944 (age 82); Boston, Massachusetts, United States
- Occupations: Musicologist, writer

David Evans (born January 22, 1944) is an American ethnomusicologist and director of the Ethnomusicology/Regional Studies program at the Rudi E. Scheidt School of Music in the University of Memphis, where he has worked since 1978. In 2023 he has been inducted in the Blues Hall of Fame as a non-performer.

== Life and career ==
He was born in Boston, Massachusetts, United States. He studied at UCLA and began making trips to the southern states in the 1960s to research and record blues musicians. He recorded the singer Jack Owens in 1970 and later produced records for Jessie Mae Hemphill and other blues musicians. His research work in the Deep South was mentioned extensively in Robert Palmer's tome, Deep Blues.

As head of the University of Memphis's High Water Recording Company, he made numerous recordings of performers in the Memphis area, some of whom were not previously documented. He has written or edited a number of books on the blues and has written liner notes and booklets for various music releases. He won a Grammy Award in 2003 for "Best Album Notes" for the CD Screamin' and Hollerin' the Blues: The Worlds of Charley Patton.

Evans has also been performing in the United States and elsewhere, both solo and with the Last Chance Jug Band. His discography includes Match Box Blues (Inside Sounds, 2002); I Didn't Know About You (Heavywood, 2005); Needy Times (Inside Sounds, 2007) and Shake That Thing! (Inside Sounds, 2006).

== Published work ==
- Tommy Johnson (London: Studio Vista, 1971), ISBN 9780289701508
- Big Road Blues: Tradition and Creativity in the Folk Blues (Berkeley: University of California Press, 1982), ISBN 9780306803000
- The NPR Curious Listener's Guide to the Blues (New York: Perigee, 2005), ISBN 978-0399530722
- Ramblin' on My Mind: New Perspectives on the Blues (Urbana: University of Illinois Press, 2008), ISBN 978-0-252-07448-6
