= Jessie Mae Hemphill =

American singer-songwriter (1923–2006)

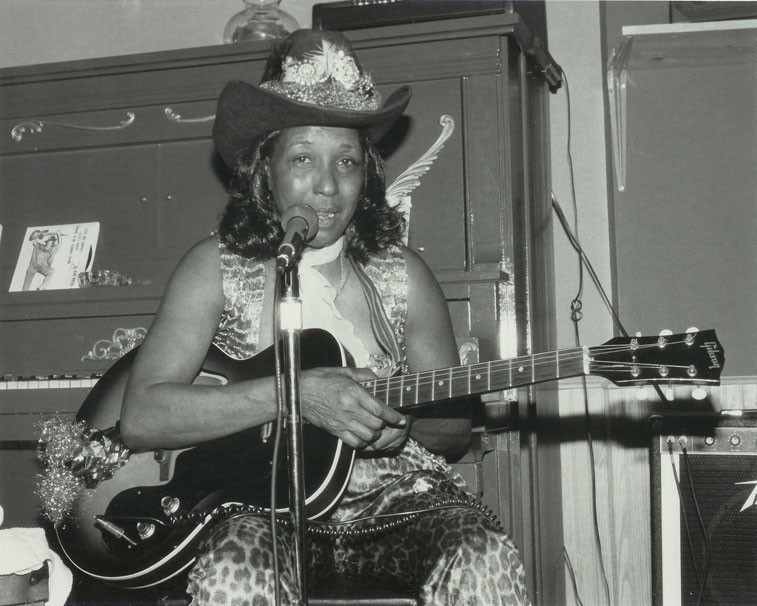
- Hemphill in the 1980s

Background information
- Born: Jessie Mae Hemphill; October 18, 1923 near Como and Senatobia, Mississippi, U.S.
- Died: July 22, 2006 (aged 82); Memphis, Tennessee, U.S.
- Genre: North Mississippi hill country blues
- Occupations: Singer-songwriter; musician
- Instruments: Vocals; guitar
- Years active: 1950s-2006

Jessie Mae Hemphill (October 18, 1923 – July 22, 2006) was an American electric guitarist, percussionist, songwriter, and vocalist specializing in the North Mississippi hill country blues traditions of her family and regional heritage.

== Life and career ==
Hemphill was born near Como and Senatobia, Mississippi, in the northern Mississippi hill country, just east of the Mississippi Delta. She began playing the guitar at the age of seven. She also played drums in local fife-and-drum bands, beginning with the band led by her paternal grandfather, Sid Hemphill, in which she played snare drum and bass drum. Aside from sitting in at Memphis bars a few times in the 1950s, most of her playing was done in family and informal settings, such as picnics with fife-and-drum music, until she was recorded in 1979.

Her first recordings were field recordings made by the blues researcher George Mitchell in 1967 and the ethnomusicologist David Evans in 1973, but they were not released. She was then known as Jessie Mae Brooks, using the surname from a brief early marriage.

In 1978, Evans came to Memphis, Tennessee, to teach at Memphis State University (now the University of Memphis). The school founded the High Water Recording Company in 1979 to promote interest in the regional music of the South. Evans made the first high-quality field recordings of Hemphill that year and produced her first sessions for High Water soon after.

Hemphill launched a recording career in the early 1980s. In 1981, her first full-length album, She-Wolf, was licensed from High Water and released by the French label Disques Vogue. In the early 1980s, she performed in a Mississippi drum corps assembled by Evans; it included Hemphill, Abe Young, and Jim Harper (who also played on Tav Falco's Panther Burns's album Behind the Magnolia Curtain). Hemphill performed in another drum group with Young and fife-and-drum band veteran Othar Turner for the television program Mr. Rogers' Neighborhood. The French label Black & Blue Records released other recordings by her. Hemphill played concerts across the United States and in other countries, including France, Germany, Spain, Italy, Belgium, the Netherlands, Sweden, Switzerland, and Canada. In 1987 and 1988 she received the W. C. Handy Award for best traditional female blues artist. In 1987 she made her New York debut, accompanied by Evans and Walter Perkins. Her first American full-length album, Feelin' Good, released in 1990, won a Handy Award for best acoustic album.

In 1993, Hemphill had a stroke, which paralyzed her left side, preventing her from playing guitar; she retired from her blues career. She continued to play by accompanying her band on the tambourine.

In 2004, the Jessie Mae Hemphill Foundation released Dare You to Do It Again, a double album and DVD of gospel standards, newly recorded by the ailing vocalist, singing and playing tambourine with accompaniment from Steve Gardner, DJ Logic, and descendants of the late musicians Junior Kimbrough, R. L. Burnside, and Otha Turner. They were her first recordings since her stroke in 1993. Also in 2004, Inside Sounds released Get Right Blues, containing material recorded from 1979 through the early 1980s, and Black & Blue released Mississippi Blues Festival, which includes seven live tracks by her from a Paris concert in 1986.

Hemphill died on July 22, 2006, at the Regional Medical Center in Memphis, after complications from an ulcer.

== Influence ==
As a successful female blues musician, Hemphill was an influential artist. Her songs have been performed by indie musician Chan Marshall. Marshall performed Hemphill's song "Lord, Help the Poor and Needy" on her album Jukebox without credit, to much controversy.

In 2003, Hemphill's protégé and collaborator, Olga Wilhelmine Munding, established the Jessie Mae Hemphill Foundation to preserve and archive the African-American music of northern Mississippi and to provide assistance for regional musicians in need who could not survive on meager publishing royalties.

One of Hemphill's songs was featured in the dance Tales from the Creek, by Reggie Wilson's Fist and Heel Performance Group, in a series of events celebrating black culture in Union Square Park, Manhattan in 1998.

== Discography ==
- She-Wolf (1981; reissued 1998)
- Swamp Surfing in Memphis, various artists (1986; reissued 1998)
- Mississippi Blues Festival, various artists (1986; reissued 2004)
- Giants of Country Blues Guitar (1967–1981), various artists (1988)
- Feelin' Good (1987; reissued 1997 with extra tracks)
- The Fabulous Low-Price HMG Blues Sampler, various artists (1997)
- Deep South Blues, various artists (1999)
- Heritage of the Blues: Shake It Baby (2003)
- Dare You to Do It Again (2004)
- Get Right Blues (2004)
- Mississippi Blues Festival, with tracks by Hezekiah & the House Rockers (2004)
- On Air: Live Music from the WEVL Archives, various artists (1996)
- Foot Hill Stomp, with Richard Johnston (2002)

== Films ==
- Deep Blues: A Musical Pilgrimage to the Crossroads (1991), directed by Robert Mugge

== Bibliography ==
- LaBalle, Candace (2002). "Jessie Mae Hemphill: Blues Musician, Singer". Contemporary Black Biography: Profiles from the International Black Community. Vol. 33. Ashyia Henderson, ed. Detroit: Thomson/Gale. pp. 81–84. via Encyclopedia.com
- Evans, David (1993). "Jessie Mae Hemphill". Black Women in America: An Historical Encyclopedia. Vol. 1. Darlene Clark Hine, ed. Brooklyn: Carlson Publishing. pp. 555–556.
