= Kenny Brown (guitarist) =

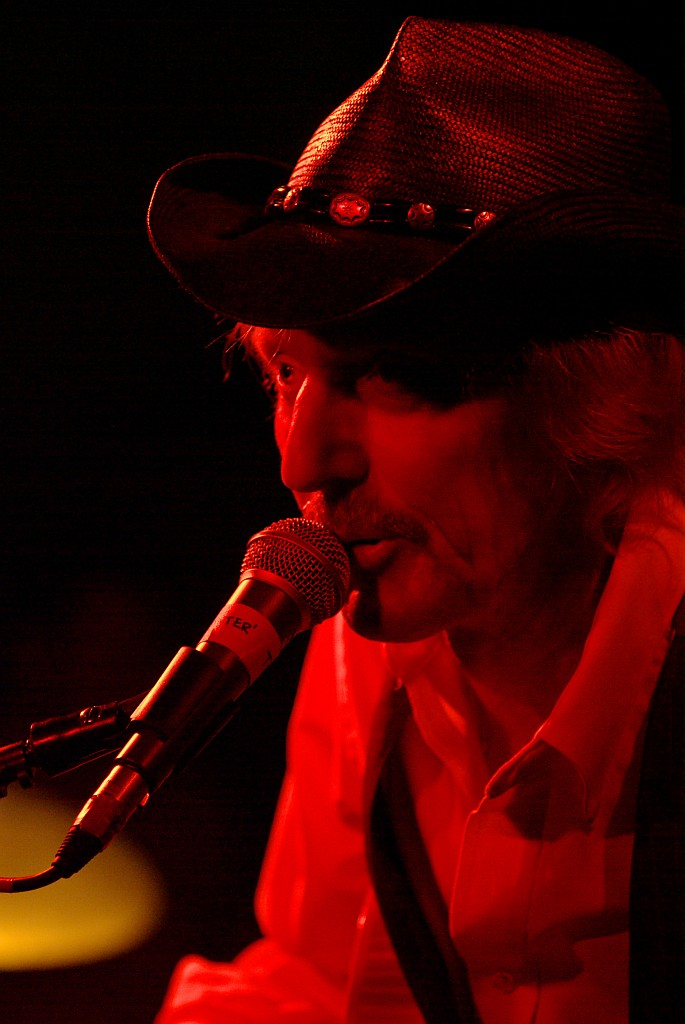

Background information
- Born: July 5, 1953 (age 73); Selma, Alabama, U.S.
- Genre: Blues
- Instrument: Guitar

Kenny Brown (born July 5, 1953) is an American blues slide guitarist skilled in the North Mississippi Hill Country blues style.

== Life and career ==
Brown was born at the Air Force base in Selma, Alabama on July 5, 1953. He apprenticed with Mississippi Joe Callicott, who was his neighbor in Nesbit, Mississippi, from age 12 to 15, when Callicott died. He had heard Othar Turner and others in nearby Como picnics, and cited Junior Kimbrough, Johnny Winter, and Johnny Shines as influences.

Around 1971, beside working in construction, Brown began playing with two other musicians. Johnny Woods would make an occasional playing partner to his death in 1990. More steady was Brown's learning with R. L. Burnside, who claimed Brown as his "adopted son," and affectionately called him "white boy on guitar" and "my white son." Brown has noted that they had trouble to book dates, when European event organizers would hear he is a white musician playing the traditionally African American blues, and that American record producers and critics have similar reservations.

Nevertheless in the early 1970s they started to perform in their region, and would keep up as a duo for 20 years. Cedric Burnside joined their tours from about 1994, as Burnside's reputation surged. In the 1990s and early 2000s, Brown participated in most of Burnside's tours and recordings, including the Burnside-Jon Spencer Blues Explosion collaborations and the remixed albums.

Brown first appeared abroad in Sweden in 1989, and later in the 1992 Åmåls Blues Fest with George "Mojo" Buford.

On record, he plays second guitar on two of Junior Kimbrough's albums throughout, and on some tracks on the posthumous compilation, God Knows I Tried. He is on tracks by Asie Payton, CeDell Davis and Paul "Wine" Jones, as well as Frank Frost and Cyndi Lauper.

Brown's own debut album was Goin' Back to Mississippi (1996), produced by Dale Hawkins. He has recorded one album for Fat Possum Records, Stingray (2003). He released Cheap, Fast, and Dirty (2006) with Danish guitarist Troels Jensen, at Olufsen Records. Meet Ya In The Bottom (2008) is a CD Baby release. His double album Can't Stay Long (2011) was released on Devil Down Records.

In their 2003 tour, he opened for Widespread Panic (and the extended combo, Smiling Assassins), as he earlier had with Burnside.

Brown's guitar work was featured in the 2006 film Black Snake Moan, where he provided backing for star Samuel L. Jackson's vocals. He can be seen in the film's climax as a guitarist in a blues band, playing alongside Cedric Burnside.

Brown's slide guitar was featured prominently in the Black Keys' 2021 album, Delta Kream. Gary Walker in his review in Guitar describes Brown's playing as "electrifying" and states that "it's worth the price of admission for Brown's scorching slide solo alone." Brown along with bassist Eric Deaton joined the Black Keys' 2022 tour to promote Dropout Boogie, joining the band on stage to perform songs from Delta Kream. Brown (along with Deaton and the Black Key's Dan Auerbach) also collaborated with Robert Finley in the 2021 album, Sharecropper's Son. Brown would also return to perform on Finley's 2023 album, Black Bayou and the Black Key's 2026 album Peaches!.

Brown performed on several songs on Hank Williams Jr. 2022 album, Rich White Honky Blues.

Brown lives in Potts Camp, Mississippi, in the North Mississippi Hill Country with his wife Sara.

== Films ==
- You See Me Laughin': The Last of the Hill Country Bluesmen (2003; released by Fat Possum Records in 2005). Produced and directed by Mandy Stein. Oxford, Mississippi: Plain Jane Productions, Inc; Fat Possum Records.
- Black Snake Moan (2006)
