= Napoleon Strickland =

Napoleon Strickland (October 1, 1919 – July 21, 2001), sometimes known as Napolian Strickland, was an American fife and drum blues artist, and songwriter, and vocalist specializing in country blues, specifically North Mississippi hill country blues. He also played guitar, drums, harmonica, fife, and all manner of percussion instruments.

== Life ==
Born near Como east of the Mississippi Delta in hill country, United States, Napoleon Strickland learned music as a boy from his father. He became adept with guitar, drums, harmonica, diddley bow, fife, and all manner of percussion. He was primarily a fife player and singer, playing a great number of festivals. He also performed on several compilation albums of North Mississippi hill country blues, as the music was recorded in the late 20th century. He appeared in the biopic documentary film, The Land Where The Blues Began.

Strickland was considered by many to have been the premier fife player of his genre. He made a living as a sharecropper for most of his life, mentoring other musicians in the region. After a car accident in the 1980s, he was committed to a nursing home but continued to play up to his death in July 2001, at the age of 81.

== Discography ==
- V/A - Mississippi Delta Blues Jam in Memphis Vol. 1 - Arhoolie Records
- V/A - Blow My Blues Away Vol. 1 - Arhoolie Records
- V/A - Traveling Through the Jungle - Testament Records
- V/A - Testament Records Sampler - Testament Records
- V/A - Feel Like Goin' Home Blues - Sony Music Canada
- V/A - Living Country Blues USA Vol. 7 - Living Country Blues Records
- V/A - Living Country Blues USA Vol. 10 - Living Country Blues Records
- V/A - Bottleneck Blues - Hightone Records
- V/A - Mississippi Delta Blues in the 1960s - Venerable Music
- V/A - Afro-American Folk Music - Venerable Music
- V/A - Memphis Swamp Jam - Blue Thumb Records

== See also ==
- Fife and drum blues
