= Asie Payton =

American blues singer and guitarist (1937–1997)

Asie Reed Payton (April 12, 1937 – May 19, 1997) was an American blues musician, who lived most of his life in Holly Ridge, Mississippi, in the Mississippi Delta. Born in Washington County, Mississippi, he sang and played the guitar, but made his living as a farmer.

Near the end of his life he recorded one album, Worried, for the Fat Possum Records label, which was released after his death. He died of a heart attack.

He appeared and performed in the documentary film, You See Me Laughin': The Last of the Hill Country Bluesmen. There is also a track by Payton on the Big Bad Love soundtrack. Payton's song, "I Love You" from the album, Worried, was used in the closing credits of the 2002 film, The Badge. Several artists from Fat Possum were featured in the soundtrack, but it was not released.

He and his wife Mary are interred at Holly Ridge Cemetery, where Charlie Patton is also buried.

Payton's song "Back to the Bridge", from his final album Just Do Me Right (2002), was featured on the compilation album The Rough Guide to Delta Blues (2002). The song is also referenced in Jeri Smith-Ready's novel Bring On The Night (2010).

== Filmography ==
- You See Me Laughin': The Last of the Hill Country Bluesmen (2003; released by Fat Possum Records in 2005)
