= Robert Mugge =

American documentary film maker (born 1950)

- Born: Robert Edwin Mugge; May 8, 1950 (age 76); Chicago, Illinois, U.S.
- Occupations: Filmmaker and professor
- Years active: 1970s to present
- Spouse: Diana Zelman
- Website: www.robertmugge.com

Robert Mugge (born May 8, 1950) is an American documentary film maker. He has focused primarily on films about music and musicians, but some of his earliest films were not music focused and he is now continuing to branch out as his interests and work evolve.

== Biography ==
Robert Mugge was born in Chicago, Illinois where his father, Robert H. Mugge, was earning his doctorate in Sociology from the University of Chicago. Over the next two years, the family moved to Atlanta, Washington, DC, and then Raleigh, North Carolina, as Mugge's father finished his dissertation on Black Migration in the South and began a career in state and federal government. In 1959, Mugge moved with his father, his mother Elizabeth Mugge (née Messersmith), and three younger siblings to the Washington, D.C. suburb of Silver Spring, Maryland, which the family made its permanent home.

Mugge attended John F. Kennedy High School in Silver Spring during its progressive period of the mid-1960s where he was encouraged to write poetry, perform in rock bands, compose a musical comedy, and publish an underground newspaper and yearbook. During a two-year stint at Frostburg State University, he wrote short plays, practiced photography, and staged large scale multimedia events before transferring to the University of Maryland, Baltimore County (UMBC) to study filmmaking. At UMBC, he designed his own academic major titled Film and Associated Art Media and received one of the first "Youthgrants in the Humanities" from the National Endowment for the Humanities to direct a long form documentary titled Frostburg which focused on the Appalachian mining town where he had lived previously. He then spent one year as a grad assistant and MFA candidate in Temple University's Documentary Filmmaking program but left without finishing in order to pursue his career. As an aspiring filmmaker, he was perhaps most influenced by a course in film theory given by the late Serbian-American filmmaker and educator Slavko Vorkapich at the AFI Theatre at the Kennedy Center. Other influences on his work (whether evident or not) included Ken Russell's passionate portraits of artists, dancers, and composers for the BBC, the surreal animation of Max and Dave Fleischer, the kaleidoscopic choreography of Busby Berkeley, the intimate documentaries of D.A. Pennebaker and Les Blank, the sprawling historical documentaries of Marcel Ophuls and Louis Malle, and the films of such international auteurs as Akira Kurosawa, Federico Fellini, Jean-Luc Godard, Samuel Fuller, Nicholas Ray, Yasujiro Ozu, Nicolas Roeg, Ernst Lubitsch, and Max Ophuls.

For approximately four decades, Mugge has worked as an independent producer-director-writer-editor, obtaining financing for his film and television projects from a wide variety of national and international funders. From 1976 through 2003, he was based in the Philadelphia, Pennsylvania area where he produced many feature-length documentaries, most of them music-related, for Britain's Channel 4 Television, BMG Video, Starz Entertainment Group, state governments, and assorted others. From 2003 to 2005, he served as Filmmaker in Residence for Mississippi Public Broadcasting and its Foundation for Public Broadcasting in Jackson, MS. From 2005 through 2009, he returned to independent filmmaking, first in Mississippi and then in Media, PA, a suburb of Philadelphia. From 2009 through 2014, he was given a five-year appointment as the Edmund F. and Virginia B. Ball Endowed Chair in Telecommunications at Ball State University in Muncie, Indiana where he designed and taught upper-level courses in the art, craft, and business of fiction and nonfiction filmmaking while utilizing students as crew for his own latest productions. Since completing that appointment in July 2014, Mugge has produced additional films in collaboration with Diana Zelman, his production partner since 2005 and his wife since 2012.

== Body of work ==
Robert Mugge's first documentary, directed in 1972 on a grant from the National Endowment for the Humanities while he was a student at UMBC, was Frostburg, a 50-minute portrait of an Appalachian mining town in western Maryland. In 1976, on grants from the National Endowment for the Arts, he directed George Crumb: Voice Of The Whale, a 54-minute portrait of Pulitzer Prize-winning composer George Crumb. In 1977, with funding from a limited partnership, he directed (and his then partner Heidi Trombert produced) Amateur Night At City Hall: The Story Of Frank L. Rizzo, a 75-minute portrait of controversial Philadelphia Mayor Frank Rizzo. From 1978 through 1980, largely with the backing of friends, he directed Sun Ra: A Joyful Noise, a 60-minute portrait of visionary jazz artist Sun Ra. In 1982, with funding from Britain's Channel 4 Television, he directed Black Wax, a 79-minute portrait of poet-singer-songwriter Gil Scott-Heron. In 1983, he was commissioned to direct Cool Runnings: The Reggae Movie, a 105-minute concert film, at the 1983 Sunsplash Festival in Montego Bay, Jamaica. In 1983/1984, with funding from Britain's Channel 4 Television, he directed Gospel According To Al Green, a 94-minute portrait of soul singer and gospel preacher Al Green. In 1985, with funding once again from Britain's Channel 4, he directed The Return Of Ruben Blades, an 82-minute portrait of actor-lawyer-singer-songwriter Ruben Blades. In 1986, with funding from Britain's Channel 4, Japan's Yomiuri Shimbun, Fantasy Records, and others, he directed Saxophone Colossus, a 101-minute portrait of jazz great Sonny Rollins. In 1987, with funding from the State of Hawaii, Sony Video Software, and the Corporation for Public Broadcasting, he directed Hawaiian Rainbow, an 85-minute film on the history of Hawaiian music. In 1987/1988, with funding from PBS, he directed Entertaining The Troops, featuring a reunion of Bob Hope with surviving members of his WWII troupe of performers. In 1988/1989, with funding from the State of Hawaii and in collaboration with kumu hula (master teacher) Vicky Holt Takamini, he directed Kumu Hula: Keepers Of A Culture, an 85-minute film about the history of Hawaiian dance.

In 1990/1991, with funding from Dave Stewart of Eurythmics and Britain's Channel 4, Mugge directed (for producers Eileen Gregory and John Stewart) Deep Blues, a 91-minute exploration of Mississippi blues made in collaboration with music writer Robert Palmer. In 1992, with funding from BMG Video and others, he directed Pride And Joy: The Story Of Alligator Records, a portrait of Bruce Iglauer's contemporary blues label. In 1993/1994, with funding again from BMG Video and others, he directed three films simultaneously: the 101-minute Gather At The River: A Bluegrass Celebration; the 71-minute The Kingdom Of Zydeco; and the 86-minute True Believers: The Musical Family Of Rounder Records. In 1996, with funding from Margaritaville Records, he directed Iguanas In The House, a 27-minute film about New Orleans band The Iguanas. In 1998/1999, with funding from WinStar Entertainment and the support of the Rock & Roll Hall of Fame & Museum, he directed Hellhounds On My Trail: The Afterlife Of Robert Johnson, a look at the lasting influence of blues legend Robert Johnson. In 1999/2000, with funding from the State of Louisiana, he directed the 2-hour Rhythm ’n’ Bayous: A Road Map To Louisiana Music. In 2002, with funding from Starz Entertainment Group, he directed Last Of The Mississippi Jukes starring Morgan Freeman and others.

In 2003, while working for Mississippi Public Broadcasting, Mugge directed thirteen 60-second mini-movies about Mississippi blues titled Blues Breaks. That same year at MPB, he directed A Night At Club Ebony (completed in 2006 but never released due to rights issues), an 86-minute history of a legendary Delta concert venue, and an accompanying 48-minute concert film titled The Road Home: B.B. King In Indianola (also still unreleased). In 2004/2005, while working for MPB's Foundation for Public Broadcasting in Mississippi, he directed Blues Divas, a 2-hour film and 8-hour TV series starring Morgan Freeman, Odetta, Mavis Staples, and many others. Those same years, while working for MPB's Foundation, he also directed Memphis Blues Again: The 25th Anniversary W.C. Handy Blues Awards, an 87-minute concert film never released due to rights issues. In 2005/2006, with funding from Starz Entertainment Group, he directed (and produced with his new partner Diana Zelman) New Orleans Music In Exile, a 2-hour film about the effects of Hurricane Katrina on the New Orleans music community. In 2007, he was commissioned to direct Deep Sea Blues, a 2-hour record of the January 2007 Legendary Rhythm & Blues Cruise to the Caribbean. In 2010, he directed Big Shoes: Walking And Talking The Blues, A 90-minute Portrait Of Musician And Music Critic Ted Drozdowski And His Band Scissormen. In 2010/2011, He Directed All Jams On Deck, a 96-minute look at blues jamming shot on the October 2010 Blues Cruise to Mexico. Between 2011 and 2013, he directed Souvenirs Of Bucovina: A Romanian Survival Guide, a 2-hour film about a unique region now comprising Northern Romania and Southern Ukraine. Between 2012 and 2014, he directed Giving Up The Ghosts: Closing Time At Doc’s Music Hall, an 80-minute film about Muncie, in doctor and musician John Peterson and a music and arts venue he founded. Between 2012 and 2015, with partial funding from the Ball Brothers Foundation, he directed Steve Bell Storyteller: The Stories Behind The Stories, a 2-hour film and accompanying 4 1/2-hour oral history on the career of veteran ABC News correspondent and anchor Steve Bell. In 2014/2015, commissioned by Philadelphia's WXPN and with funding from the Pew Center for Arts & Heritage, he directed Zydeco Crossroads: A Tale Of Two Cities, an 87-minute look at the Creole music scene of Southwest Louisiana and a sequel to his earlier The Kingdom Of Zydeco. As part of the Zydeco Crossroads project, he also directed Rosie’s In The House Tonight, a 55-minute concert film starring American Creole zydeco accordion player and singer Rosie Ledet.

Mugge edits all of his own films and writes and produces most of them as well. Since 2005, he has produced all films in collaboration with Diana Zelman.

== Awards and honors ==
Year	Award
2008	Mugge receives "Lifetime Achievement Award" from Cinema on the Bayou Film Festival for "Documentation of Southern Roots Music Culture in Film".
2008	Sun Ra: A Joyful Noise named one of the "50 Greatest Music Films Ever" by Time Out London.
2007	Mugge nominated for a United States Artists Fellowship.
2007	Deep Blues named one of the "Top 25 Music DVDs of All Time" by Rolling Stone.
2007	Deep Blues named an "Essential Southern Documentary" by the Oxford American.
2007	Robert Mugge and Diana Zelman receive "Big Easy Music Award" from Gambit Weekly for making New Orleans Music In Exile.
2005	Mugge receives Luminaria Award for Lifetime Achievement from Santa Fe Film Festival.
2003	Mugge's Mississippi Blues Film Trilogy (Deep Blues, Hellhounds On My Trail, and Last Of The Mississippi Jukes) selected as weeklong opening attraction for second screen of AFI Silver Theatre.
1992	Mugge receives "Keeping the Blues Alive in Film" Award from Blues Foundation in Memphis.
1992	Deep Blues is Mugge's fourth film to play Sundance Film Festival.
1990	Sonny Rollins's G-Man album (soundtrack for Mugge's 1986 film Saxophone Colossus) selected in Village Voice critics' poll as one of "Ten Best Jazz Albums of the 1980s".
1989	Entertaining The Troops receives Gold Special Jury Award from Houston Film Festival.
1988	Six of Robert Mugge's feature-length music documentaries broadcast as national PBS series titled Summer Night Music.
1986	Mugge receives Special Award "In Recognition of Outstanding Achievement in the Art of Film" from Denver International Film Festival.
1985	Gospel According To Al Green receives Gold Lone Star Award from Virgin Islands International Film Festival.
1978	Amateur Night At City Hall receives Silver Hugo Award from Chicago International Film Festival.

== Filmography ==
Year	Film title	Subject
1973	Frostburg	Mining town
1976	George Crumb: Voice of the Whale	George Crumb
1978	Amateur Night at City Hall: The Story of Frank L. Rizzo	City politics
1980	Sun Ra: A Joyful Noise	Afrofuturism
1982	Black Wax	Gil Scott-Heron
1983	Cool Runnings: The Reggae Movie	Sunsplash
1984	Gospel According to Al Green	Al Green
1985	The Return of Rubén Blades	Rubén Blades
1986	Saxophone Colossus	Sonny Rollins
1987	Hawaiian Rainbow	Hawaiian music
1988	Entertaining the Troops	Bob Hope, etc.
1989	Kumu Hula: Keepers of a Culture	Hawaiian dance
1991	Deep Blues	Delta Blues
1992	Pride and Joy: The Story of Alligator Records	Alligator Records
1994	Gather at the River: A Bluegrass Celebration	Bluegrass Music
1994	The Kingdom of Zydeco	Zydeco
1994	True Believers: The Musical Family of Rounder Records	Rounder Records
1996	Iguanas in the House	Roots music
1999	Hellhounds on My Trail: The Afterlife of Robert Johnson	Robert Johnson
2000	Rhythm 'n' Bayous: A Road Map to Louisiana Music	Music of Louisiana
2003	Last of the Mississippi Jukes	Blues venues
2003	Blues Breaks	Blues culture
2004	Blues Divas	Blues women
2005	Memphis Blues Again: The 25th Anniversary W. C. Handy Blues Awards (unreleased)	Blues Music Award
2006	New Orleans Music in Exile	Music of New Orleans
2006	A Night at Club Ebony (unreleased)	Delta venue
2007	Deep Sea Blues	Blues cruise
2010	Big Shoes: Walking and Talking the Blues	Scissormen
2011	All Jams On Deck	Blues jamming
2013	Souvenirs of Bucovina: A Romanian Survival Guide	Eastern Europe
2014	Giving Up The Ghosts: Closing Time at Doc’s Music Hall	Music venue
2015	Steve Bell Storyteller: The Stories Behind the Stories	Steve Bell, Journalism
2015	Rosie’s in the House Tonight	Rosie Ledet
2015	Zydeco Crossroads: A Tale of Two Cities	Creole culture
