= Fife and drum blues =

American folk music

Fife and drum blues is an American folk music form derived from country blues, martial music tradition, and African rhythms. It is performed typically with one lead fife player and a troop of drummers. Unlike a drum corps, the drum troop is loosely structured. As such, a fife and drum band may have a variable number of snare and bass drum players. A large military-style bass drum is preferred. Fife and drum performances are often family affairs held at reunions, summer community picnics, and on holidays.

== History ==
Pre-American Civil War military fife and drum bands provided a rough framework which black musicians would fill with African and African-American influences to create a new music. Black fife and drum music persists in a stretch of Southern states stretching from northwest Georgia to an area south of Memphis, namely North Mississippi. The music is infused with Euro-American military drum tradition and distinctly African polyrhythms, talking drum influence, and call and response patterns. Performers play blues, marches, minstrel show pieces, popular music, instrumentals, and spirituals such as "When the Saints Go Marching In", "When I Lay My Burden Down", "My Babe" and "Sitting on Top of the World". A "march" becomes more of a swaying dance, sometimes led by a dancer, and singing comes in sporadic shouts, whoops, and moans from the different players. While spirituals are sometimes played, gatherings of drum and fife music are not religious in nature and not held on Sundays or in church.

Alan Lomax first recorded black fife and drum music in 1942. He found a group, including Sid Hemphill, near Sledge, Mississippi consisting of a cane fife, two snare drums, and a bass drum. These same musicians constituted themselves as a string band, using violin, banjo, guitar, and bass drum.

Notable performers include Napoleon Strickland, Othar Turner, Turner's granddaughter Shardé Thomas, Turner's daughter, Bernice, Jessie Mae Hemphill, Ed and Lonnie Young, and the Mitchel Brothers from Georgia.

== See also ==
- Fife and Drum Corps

== Further viewing ==
- American Patchwork: Songs and Stories of America, part 3: "The Land Where the Blues Began" (1990). Written, directed, and produced by Alan Lomax; developed by the Association for Cultural Equity at Columbia University and Hunter College. North Carolina Public TV; A Dibb Direction production for Channel Four. (Watch film: The Land Where the Blues Began)
- Deep Blues (1991). Directed by Robert Mugge.
- Gravel Springs Fife and Drum (1971). Filmed by Bill Ferris, recorded by David Evans, and edited by Judy Peiser. (Watch film: Gravel Springs Fife and Drum
