= Hill country blues =

Regional style of country blues music

- Stylistic origins: Blues; country blues
- Cultural origins: Mississippi, U.S.

Hill country blues (also known as North Mississippi hill country blues or North Mississippi blues) is a regional style of country blues. It is characterized by a strong emphasis on rhythm and percussion, steady guitar riffs, few chord changes, unconventional song structures, and heavy emphasis on the "groove", which has been characterized as the "hypnotic boogie".

The hill country is a region of northern Mississippi bordering Tennessee. It lies in the counties of Marshall, Panola, Tate, Tippah, and Lafayette and straddles the ecoregions of the North Hilly Plain (Red Clay Hills or North Central Hills), the Loess Plains, and Bluff Hills. The hills have poor agricultural soil and wide forested areas, which led to the development of a lumber industry but only small farms. Holly Springs and Oxford, Mississippi, are often cited as centers of hill country music. The style is regarded as distinct from the blues of the Mississippi Delta, which lies west of the hill country. An annual picnic is held to celebrate the region and its music.

== Origins ==
Musical scholars have traced the style's affinity for percussion to influences from West Africa, brought to the American colonies by African slaves. Before the American Civil War, planters restricted slaves' access to drums and other percussion instruments, fearing the use of drums in arousing rebellion. The music writer Robert Palmer believed that after the Civil War, African Americans quickly renewed their long-suppressed percussion traditions: "the passage of the Black Codes, which in most states actually predated the Revolutionary War, did not automatically stamp out all slave drumming". Palmer also noted:

[The style] could not have developed in the first place if there hadn't been a reservoir of polyrhythmic sophistication in the culture that nurtured it. David Evans, an anthropologist who has done extensive fieldwork in the hill country of northern Mississippi, recorded black families there who play polyrhythmic music in their homes on chairs, tin cans, and empty bottles. He reports that among the area's older black fife and drum musicians, making the drums "talk it"—that is, playing rhythm patterns that conform to proverbial phrases or the words of popular fife and drum tunes—"is considered the sign of a good drummer." This enduring tradition of folk polyrhythm played an important part in the development of Mississippi blues.

== Recorded artists ==
"Mississippi" Fred McDowell, who lived in Como, Mississippi, was one of the subgenre's most widely known musicians, in the 1960s and after. His music was heavier on percussive elements and African rhythms than traditional Delta blues. McDowell's performances helped define the hill country blues sound, influencing later artists, such as R. L. Burnside and Junior Kimbrough. Other influential hill country musicians include the multitalented Robert Belfour, Calvin Jackson, and Sid Hemphill.

Burnside, Kimbrough, Othar Turner, and Jessie Mae Hemphill appeared in the documentary Deep Blues and went on to popularize this sound through recordings released by Fat Possum Records. The families of these artists along with North Mississippi Allstars formed a new generation of hill country musicians. Banjo player Lucius Smith, fife and drum musicians Ed Young and Napoleon Strickland, and guitarist and singer Rosa Lee Hill also influenced this style. Others, such as Terry "Harmonica" Bean, Cedric Burnside, and Kenny Brown carry on the hill country blues tradition today. Other musicians such as The Bush League Blues Band from Richmond Virginia play an electrified version of hill-country as filtered through Memphis, and the Black Keys' tenth studio album consists entirely of hill country blues covers.

== See also ==
- Fife and drum blues
- List of country blues musicians
- Music of Mississippi
