= R. L. Burnside =

American blues musician (1926–2005)

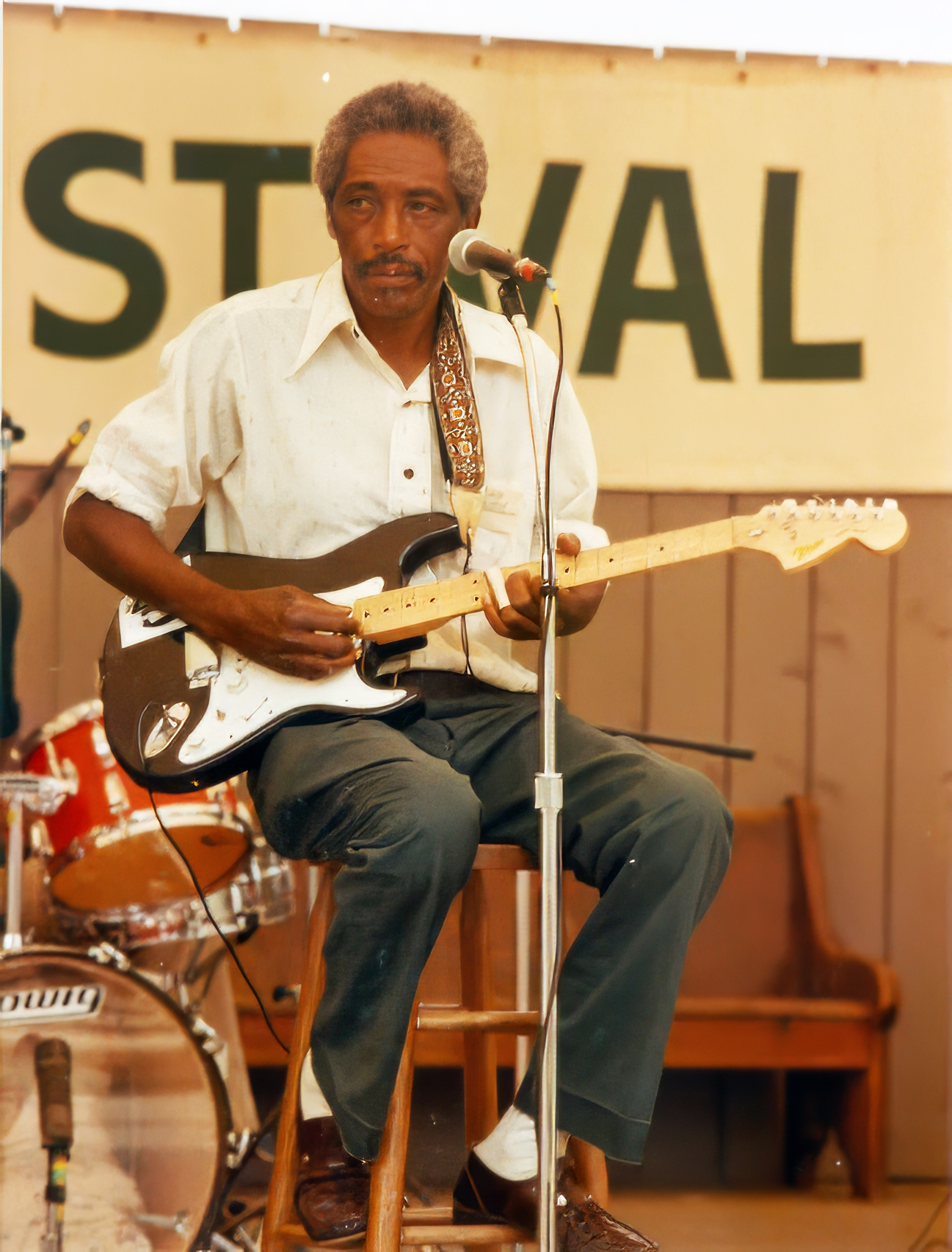
- Burnside performing at the 1982 World's Fair in Knoxville, Tennessee

Background information
- Born: November 23, 1926; Harmontown, Mississippi, U.S.
- Origin: Oxford, Mississippi, U.S.
- Died: September 1, 2005 (aged 78) Memphis, Tennessee, U.S.
- Genres: Blues; hill country blues
- Instruments: Guitar; vocals
- Years active: 1960s–2005
- Label: Fat Possum

R. L. Burnside (November 23, 1926 – September 1, 2005) was an American hill country blues singer, songwriter, and guitarist. He played music for most of his life but received little recognition until 1995 when Burnside recorded and toured with Jon Spencer, garnering crossover appeal and introducing his music to a new fan base, particularly in the punk and garage rock scenes.

== Life and career ==
=== 1926–1959: Early years ===
Burnside was born in 1926 to Earnest Burnside and Josie Malone, in either Harmontown, College Hill, or Blackwater Creek, all of which are in the rural part of Lafayette County, Mississippi, near the area that would be covered by Sardis Lake a few years later. His first name is given variously as R. L., Rural, (Note: Burnside's headstone reads "R. L. (Rural) Burnside".) Robert Lee, Rule, or Ruel. His father left the family early on, and R. L. grew up with his mother, grandparents, and several siblings.

He played the harmonica and dabbled with playing guitar, beginning at the age of 16. He said he first played in public at age 21 or 22. He learned mostly from Mississippi Fred McDowell, who had lived near Burnside since Burnside was a child. He first heard McDowell playing at age 7 or 8 and eventually joined his gigs to play a late set. Other local teachers were his wife's brother, his uncle-in-law Ranie Burnette, who was a popular player from Senatobia, the mostly unknown Henry Harden, Son Hibbler, Jesse Vortis, and possibly Stonewall Mays. Burnside cited church singing and fife-and-drum picnics as elements of his childhood's musical landscape, and he credited Muddy Waters, Lightnin' Hopkins, and John Lee Hooker as influences in adulthood.

In the late 1940s he moved to Chicago, where his father had lived since he separated from his mother, in the hope of finding better economic opportunities. He found jobs at metal and glass factories, had the company of Muddy Waters (his cousin-in-law), and enjoyed the blues scene on Maxwell Street. But things did not turn out as he had hoped; within the span of one year his father, two brothers, and two uncles were all murdered in the city. (Note: Burnside would later draw upon this experience in his work, particularly in his interpretation of Skip James's "Hard Time Killing Floor" and the talking blues "R.L.'s Story", the opening and closing tracks of Wish I Was in Heaven Sitting Down (2000).)

Three years after coming to Chicago, Burnside went back south. He married Alice Mae Taylor in 1949 or 1950, his second marriage. (Note: His first marriage is apparently alluded to in a story he would tell in response to questions like "What is the blues about?": "It's when you get to your house, late at night, and the first thing you meet out there in the driveway is the cat, sayin'—[in a well-imitated cat's voice] 'She-ain't-here, She-ain't-here.'—You got the blues then. Your wife done gone." (Cited from "New York Magazine". Newyorkmetro.com: 94. 11 September 1995. ISSN 0028-7369.; similar versions of the story are in "Have You Ever Been Lonely" from A Ass Pocket of Whiskey (1996) and the opening of You See Me Laughin')) He moved several times in the 1950s, between Memphis, Tennessee, the Mississippi Delta and the hill country of northern Mississippi. During his time in the Delta, he met bluesmen Robert Lockwood Jr. and Aleck "Rice" Miller. It seems it was around that time that Burnside killed a man, possibly at a craps game, was convicted of murder and incarcerated in Parchman Farm. He would later relate that his boss at the time had arranged to release him after six months, as he needed Burnside's skills as a tractor driver. (Note: About the incident he would recite, "I didn't mean to kill nobody. I just meant to shoot the sonofabitch in the head and two times in the chest. Him dying was between him and the Lord.")

=== 1960–1990: Part-time musician ===
He spent the next 45 years, not unlike his early years, in Panola and Tate counties, in northern Mississippi. At first he kept to particularly remote dwellings, working into the 1980s as a sharecropper growing cotton and soybean, as a commercial fisherman on the Tallahatchie River, selling his catch from door to door, and as a truck driver. Later he moved closer to Holly Springs. After coming back to Mississippi, and especially after marrying, he picked more local gigs, playing guitar in juke joints and bars (some under his management), at picnics and at his own open house parties, (Note: Evans provided a few more details: Nelson, Chris (1997-08-02). "Classic R.L. Burnside 'House Party' Style Recordings Reissued". MTV News. Archived from the original on June 21, 2015., to which the Mississippi Blues Commission adds at: "Tate County Blues". Mississippi Blues Trail.) and at the occasional festival.

His earliest recordings were made in 1967 by George Mitchell, then a graduate student of journalism. Mitchell and his wife went on a 13-day summer trip in Mississippi, which resulted in the first recordings of several country blues artists. He came to Burnside's house near Coldwater on the advice of fife player and maker Othar Turner. Mitchell wrote that Fred McDowell had not told him about Burnside, likely because Burnside posed "big-time competition". Six of the songs, played on an acoustic guitar lent by Mitchell, were released on Arhoolie Records after two years; nine others are on later records. Another album of acoustic material was recorded in 1969 for Adelphi Records, not to be released until thirty years later. Recordings from 1975 had a similar fate.

These recordings featured Burnside playing acoustic guitar and singing, and a few tracks had harmonica accompaniment by W.C. Veasey or Ulysse Red Ramsey. Although not recorded, by that time Burnside also played electric guitar. His early repertoire came from hill country and Memphis favorites, John Lee Hooker, Muddy Waters, hits by Howlin' Wolf and Elmore James, and sides by Yank Rachell, Lightnin' Hopkins, and Lonesome Sundown.

In 1969, he performed for the first time outside the United States, at a program in Montreal with Lightnin' Hopkins and John Lee Hooker. As a solo performer, he made three tours in Europe, appearing before enthusiastic audiences. In 1974, he played at the New Orleans Jazz & Heritage Festival, the first of nine of these festivals at which he performed. Also in 1974, Tav Falco filmed Burnside in the Brotherhood Sportsmen's Lodge, a juke joint he ran at the time near Como. (Note: Some of the 26 minutes of footage is included in You See Me Laughin'. Burnside was instrumental in Falco becoming a guitarist, and Tav Falco's Panther Burns were probably the first to cover, and name, a Burnside composition on record: "Snake Drive" on Behind the Magnolia Curtain, 1981. Band member Lorette Velvette produced other early covers in her solo albums.) His performance featured the slide guitarist Kenny Brown, Burnside's friend and understudy, whom he began tutoring in 1971 and claimed as his "adopted son". In 1978, Burnside was filmed by Alan Lomax in what remained mostly outtakes of the television documentary The Land Where the Blues Began. (Note: Later released on a 2010 DVD, and the Alan Lomax Archive's Youtube channel: playlist)

A series of recordings in 1979 by the musicologist David Evans for his record label High Water was the first to feature Burnside's Sound Machine, which included his sons Duwayne and Daniel on guitar, his son Joseph on bass, and his son-in-law Calvin Jackson on drums. The band was active mostly in home settings but also joined Burnside in Europe in 1980 and 1983. They offered a rare fusion of rural and urban blues, funk, R&B and soul, (Note: In Burnside's words, "they can play rock 'n' roll and disco too".) which appealed to young Mississippians; their sets included covers of songs by Jimmy Rogers, Little Walter, Albert King and Little Milton. An EP, Sound Machine Groove, was released by Evans's label in the US but had next to no distribution. Apart from it, one full album of the same title, a debut of sorts, was licensed for prompt European release by Disques Vogue, and another hour's worth was released by the Memphis label Inside Sounds in 2001.

From 1980 to 1986, Burnside recorded for the Dutch label Old Swingmaster and for the French label Arion, mostly solo or with harmonica accompaniment: Johnny Woods served on some occasions (he also recorded as a lead artist, with guitar accompaniment by Burnside); Curtis Salgado served once in a New Orleans session. Selections focused on hill country material and starker, less danceable songs by Lightnin' Hopkins, Muddy Waters and John Lee Hooker. The results were four more LP releases and a videotape under his name, all in European markets.

In the mid-1980s, Burnside retired from farm work and became more busy with music. For about 12 years he worked with New Orleans–based harpist Jon (Joni) Morris Neremberg (or Nuremberg). He appeared before American crowds at such occasions as the 1982 World's Fair, the 1984 Louisiana World Exposition, and the 1986 San Francisco Blues Festival, between international tours. By the mid-1980s he toured about "once a year or maybe twice", and by one report in 1985 he had been to Europe 17 times. Recordings from his time with Morris were eventually released on two records, both produced by M.C. Records and Louis X. Erlanger: Acoustic Stories (a session from 1988) and Well, Well, Well (a 2001 compilation of informal recordings provided by Morris).

=== 1991–2005: Commercial success and declining health ===
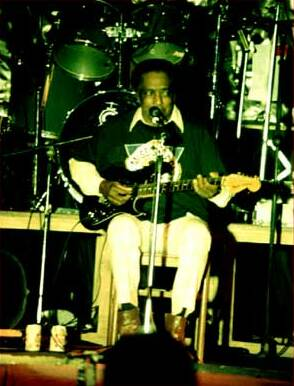
Burnside at the Liri Blues Festival, Italy, in 1992

In the late 1970s or early 1980s, Burnside was introduced and struck a partnership with Junior Kimbrough. Roughly a decade later, his own Burnside Palace had shut down (Note: Like many joints that were abandoned in response to the crack epidemic.) and the family lived next to the Kimbroughs' new Junior's Place in Chulahoma, Mississippi and collaborated with the counterpart musical family. The music writer Robert Palmer, teaching for a time in the University of Mississippi in Oxford, frequented the scene with some celebrity musicians, which led to the making in 1990 of the documentary Deep Blues, in which Burnside was prominently featured.

Burnside began recording for the Oxford, Mississippi, label Fat Possum Records in 1991. The label, dedicated to recording aging north Mississippi bluesmen such as Burnside and Junior Kimbrough, was founded by two students who had been attending their performances for some years—Peter Redvers-Lee, editor of Living Blues magazine, and Matthew Johnson, a writer for the magazine. Burnside remained with Fat Possum from that time until his death. Their first output was Bad Luck City (1992), featuring the Sound Machine. The next, Too Bad Jim (1994), was recorded at Junior's Place and produced by Palmer, with support from Calvin Jackson and Kenny Brown. After Jackson moved to Holland, Burnside found a new stable band and would usually perform with Brown and drummer Cedric Burnside, his grandson. R.L. played his first art museum gig when Grammy nominee/producer Larry Hoffman brought him to Baltimore to play the Walters Art Museum in February 1993 as the feature of a Baltimore Folk Music Society concert.

In a New York concert around the release of the documentary Deep Blues, he attracted the attention of Jon Spencer, the leader of the Jon Spencer Blues Explosion. He started touring with this group in 1995, both as an opening act and sitting in, gaining many new fans. The 1996 album A Ass Pocket of Whiskey was recorded with Spencer's band and was marketed for their audience, but was credited to Burnside. It gained critical acclaim and received praise from Bono and Iggy Pop; Billboard magazine wrote that "it sounds like no other blues album ever released" and an author there picked it for a year's end critics' poll, but Living Blues opined that it was "perhaps the worst blues album ever made". (Note: His work with Jon Spencer was later cited as an influence by Hillstomp and covered on record by The Immortal Lee County Killers.)

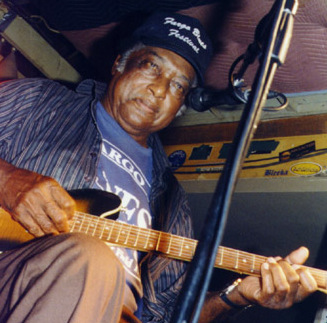
Burnside at the Double Door Inn in Charlotte, N.C., in 1998

After parting ways with the Blues Explosion, the label turned to produce music in which recorded materials were remixed by producer Tom Rothrock with an eye to techno, downtempo and hip-hop listeners. The experiment started with a track in Mr. Wizard (1997), an album based on a variety of sessions, and matured into a full album with Come On In (1998). The recording artists themselves heard only the final product, but they conceded that with time they came to like it, in part influenced by its popularity.

Burnside continued to tour, perhaps more extensively than ever. He opened for the Beastie Boys, was a musical guest on Late Night with Conan O'Brien and on HBO's Reverb, provided entertainment at private events such as Richard Gere's birthday party, and participated in shared or showcase bills with other Fat Possum artists, notably T-Model Ford, Paul "Wine" Jones, CeDell Davis, Robert Cage and Robert Belfour. An influx of visitors and young musicians were attracted to Junior's Place, before it burned down in 2000.

Documentary coverage of his contemporaneous life and work expanded too. Bradley Beesley filmed the 60-minute Hill Stomp Hollar, a film about Burnside and other Fat Possum artists, that received a positive response at the 1999 SXSW Film Festival premiere, but that was not approved for release by the label. Much of Beesley's footage and many of his interviews became part of the 77-minute You See Me Laughin', directed by Mandy Stein; it was released by Fat Possum in 2003. A 1999 date at Paris' New Morning club, with Brown and Cedric, was an occasion at which the French blues singer Sophie Kay (also known as Sophie Kertesz) filmed a 52-minute documentary.

Before long, however, Burnside was in declining health. He had an ear infection and underwent heart surgery in 1999. As his tours decreased to a minimum, Wish I Was In Heaven Sitting Down (2000) was released, which relegated guitar work to other players (Rick Holmstrom, Smokey Hormel, John Porter) but used Burnside's vocals. After a heart attack in 2001, his doctor advised him to stop drinking; Burnside did, but he reported that change left him unable to play. Fat Possum rebounded with A Bothered Mind (2004), an album that used previously recorded guitar tracks, and included collaborations with Kid Rock and Lyrics Born.

These remix albums received mixed reviews, some describing the results as "unnatural" while others lauded the playful spirit, or "the way it yokes authentic blues feeling to new technology". Commercially, the remixes were successful; each surpassed its previous in Billboard's Top Blues Albums chart, as they stayed there for 12–18 weeks' periods (but none entered into the more competitive Hot R&B/Hip-Hop Songs), (Note: From a hip-hop perspective the Fat Possum efforts were among the very first to incorporate the blues, but ultimately did not alter the younger genre's landscape. One clear precursor is found in The Wolf that House Built from Little Axe, others are by Chris Thomas (King). Contemporary projects, that used archival blues samples, included Moby's extremely successful Play (1999), Tangle Eye's remix of Alan Lomax material (2004), and with a broader mix, Alabama 3's Exile on Coldharbour Lane (1997).) and two tracks from Come On In were included in The Sopranos' soundtrack. "Let My Baby Ride" off Come On In received significant airplay and an ensuing music clip was slotted in MTV's 120 Minutes; the album's "Rollin' & Tumblin'" accompanied a 2002 Nissan TV commercial. But the live, unremixed album Burnside on Burnside (2001) peaked at number 4 of Billboard's Blues Albums chart and was nominated for a Grammy. – the last article to catch Burnside as an active bandleader, recorded in January 2001 with Brown and Cedric.

In between, Fat Possum licensed and released First Recording (2003), comprising George Mitchell's 1967 recordings in its fullest edition yet, in traditional format. (Note: In interviews Watson and Johnson of Fat Possum have indicated that Burnside was the label's best seller and enabled them to finance less commercially-assured projects, and sign new artists.) In addition, the 1990s and 2000s saw release of several recordings from previous decades by other labels, as well as a couple of new recordings by HighTone Records. In 1999 and 2000, two of his songs "Shuck Dub" and "It's Bad You Know", were featured in the sountrack for the HBO crime drama series The Sopranos.

=== Death and legacy ===
Another heart attack in November 2002 resulted in a surgery in 2003, and short-circuited any future career plans he had. Yet Burnside continued as guest singer on occasions, such as at Bonnaroo Music Festival, 2004, his last public appearance. He died at St. Francis Hospital in Memphis, Tennessee, on September 1, 2005, at the age of 78. Services were held at Rust College, in Holly Springs, with burial in the Free Springs Cemetery, in Harmontown. Around the time of his death, he resided in Byhalia, Mississippi. His immediate survivors included:

- His wife: Alice Mae Taylor Burnside (1932–2008), married 1949
- His daughters: Mildred Jean Burnside (1949–2010), Linda Jackson, Brenda Kay Brooks, and Pamela Denise Burnside
- His sons: Melvin Burnside, R.L. Burnside Jr. (1954–2010), Calvin Burnside, Joseph Burnside, Daniel Burnside, Duwayne Burnside, Dexter Burnside, Garry Burnside (youngest son), and Rodger Harmon
- His sisters: Lucille Burnside, Verlyn Burnside, and Mat Burnside
- His brother: Jesse Monia
- His 35 grandchildren: Cedric Burnside, Kent Burnside (oldest grandson)
- 32 great-grandchildren

Members of his extended family continue to play blues in the Holly Springs area and in wider circles:

- His son Duwayne Burnside has played guitar with the North Mississippi Allstars (Polaris; Hill Country Revue with R. L. Burnside). He has operated music venues named after Burnside and Alice Mae in Chulahoma, Memphis, Waterford, and Holly Springs
- His grandson Cedric Burnside has released six albums with four musical partners and toured with Kenny Brown and others
- His son Garry Burnside used to play bass guitar with Junior Kimbrough, North Mississippi Allstars, and Hill Country Revue; in 2006 he released an album with Cedric
- His son-in-law Calvin Jackson recorded with blues musicians of Burnside's generation and younger
- His grandson Kent Burnside is also a touring blues musician. Kent is currently touring with the Flood Brothers and released an album with them in 2016
- His grandson Cody released four albums and toured with the family and his own band

Burnside won one W. C. Handy Award in 2000 (Traditional Blues Male Artist of the Year), two in 2002 (Traditional Blues Male Artist of the Year; Traditional Blues Album of the Year, Burnside on Burnside), and one in 2003 (Traditional Blues Male Artist of The Year); he had 11 unsuccessful nominations in 8 years for the awards, starting in 1982, as well as one for a Grammy. Several of the Mississippi Blues Trail markers, which have been erected since 2006, mention him. In 2014 he was inducted to the Blues Hall of Fame in Memphis.

Burnside's fellow Fat Possum musicians The Black Keys credit him as an influence and interpolated his "Skinny Woman" into their track "Busted". The Black Keys would perform two Burnside covers on their album Delta Kream in 2021 featuring Kenny Brown. Brown, along with bassist Eric Deaton, would also join The Black Keys for their 2022 tour (supporting the release of Dropout Boogie) to perform the Burnside covers live.

The electronica musician St. Germain used samples of Burnside's "Nightmare Blues" throughout the track "How Dare You", on his 2015 album.

== Style ==
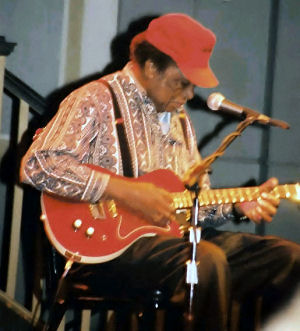
Burnside performing at the Crystal Ballroom in Portland, Oregon, in January 2001

Burnside had a powerful, expressive voice, that did not fail with old age but rather grew richer, and played both electric and acoustic guitar, with and without a slide. His drone-heavy style was more characteristic of North Mississippi hill country blues than Delta blues. Like other country blues musicians, he did not always adhere to strict 12- or 16-bar blues patterns, often adding extra beats to a measure as he saw fit. His rhythms are often based on the fife and drum blues of north Mississippi. (Note: Compare Burnside's vocal imitation of fife and drum music: You See Me Laughin' (see filmography), min. 25:55ff.)

As was the case with his role model John Lee Hooker, Burnside's earliest recordings sound quite similar to one another, even repetitive, in vocal and instrumental styling. Many of these songs eschew traditional chord changes in favor of a single chord or a simple bassline pattern that repeats throughout. Burnside played the guitar fingerstyle—without a pick—and often in open-G tuning. His vocal style is characterized by a tendency to "break" briefly into falsetto, usually at the end of long notes.

Like his contemporary T-Model Ford, Burnside favored a stripped-down approach to the blues, marked by a quality of rawness. He and his later managers and reviewers maintained his persona as a hard-working man leading a life of struggle, a heavy drinker, latent criminal singing songs of swagger and rebellion.

Burnside knew many toasts—African American narrative folk poems such as "Signifying monkey" and "Tojo Told Hitler"—and fondly recited them between songs at his concerts and on recordings. He narrated long jokes in concerts and social events, and many sources noted his quick wit and charisma.

== Discography ==
=== Studio albums ===
- Sound Machine Groove (1981)
- Plays and Sings the Mississippi Delta Blues (1981)
- Mississippi Hill Country Blues (1987)
- Skinny Woman (1989)
- Bad Luck City (1992)
- Too Bad Jim (1994)
- A Ass Pocket of Whiskey (1996)
- Mr. Wizard (1997)
- Acoustic Stories (1997)
- Come On In (1998)
- Wish I Was in Heaven Sitting Down (2000)
- A Bothered Mind (2004)

=== Live albums ===
- Mississippi Blues (1984)
- Burnside on Burnside (2001)

=== Compilation albums ===
- Going Down South (1999)
- My Black Name a-Ringin' (1999)
- Well, Well, Well (2001)
- Raw Electric (2002)
- No Monkeys on this Train (2003)
- First Recordings (2003)
- Rollin' and Tumblin': the King of Hill Country Blues (2010)
- Long Distance Call (2019)

== Films ==
- Honky Tonk (1974), by Tav Falco
- The Land Where the Blues Began (1979), by Alan Lomax, John Melville Bishop, and Worth Long in association with the Mississippi Authority for Educational Television
  - American Patchwork: Songs and Stories of America, part 3: "The Land Where the Blues Began" (1990), North Carolina Public TV, a lightly re-edited version of "The Land Where the Blues Began" (1979)
  - The Land Where the Blues Began (2010), restored original version, DVD containing two additional performances by Burnside
- Deep Blues: A Musical Pilgrimage to the Crossroads (1991), directed by Robert Mugge
- Hill Stomp Hollar (1999), by Bradley Beesley
- Un jour avec... R. L. Burnside (1999/2001), by Sophie Kertesz, produced and distributed by Ciné-Rock, Paris OCLC 691729826
- You See Me Laughin': The Last of the Hill Country Bluesmen (2002), released by Fat Possum Records in 2005, produced and directed by Mandy Stein, Oxford, Mississippi: Plain Jane Productions, Fat Possum Records
- Richard Johnston: Hill Country Troubadour (2005), directed by Max Shores, Alabama PBS, featuring an interview with Burnside and information about the Holly Springs music community
- Big Bad Love (2001), directed by Arliss Howard, with soundtrack songs by Burnside and a cameo live performance, MGM/IFC Films
- Holy Motors (2012), directed by Leos Carax, with an accordion and drum cover of "Let My Baby Ride" by Docteur L
