= Robert Palmer (American writer) =

American blues and rock writer, musician and producer (1945–1997)

- Born: Robert Franklin Palmer Jr. June 19, 1945; Little Rock, Arkansas, U.S.
- Died: November 20, 1997 (aged 52) Valhalla, New York, U.S.
- Genres: Folk rock; blues; rock
- Occupations: Writer; musician; producer
- Instruments: Clarinet; saxophone
- Formerly of: The Insect Trust

Robert Franklin Palmer Jr. (June 19, 1945 – November 20, 1997) was an American writer, musicologist, clarinetist, saxophonist, and blues producer. He is best known for his non-fictional writing on the field of music; his work as a music journalist for The New York Times and Rolling Stone magazine; his production work for blues recordings (including the soundtrack for the film Deep Blues); and his clarinet playing as a member of the 1960s jazz-based rock band the Insect Trust.

== Early life and education ==
Palmer was born in Little Rock, Arkansas, on June 19, 1945, the son of a musician and school teacher, Robert Palmer Sr.

A civil rights and peace activist with the Student Nonviolent Coordinating Committee in the 1960s, Palmer Jr. graduated from Little Rock University, which was renamed the University of Arkansas at Little Rock in 1964.

== Career ==
After graduating from college, he and fellow musicians Nancy Jeffries, Bill Barth, and Luke Faustn formed a psychedelic music group, the Insect Trust, blending jazz, folk, and blues with rock and roll. The band recorded its first, self-titled album on Capitol Records in 1968. Palmer continued to play clarinet and saxophone from time to time in local bands throughout the rest of his life.

In the early 1970s, Palmer became a contributing editor of Rolling Stone, and worked as a journalist for film magazines. He became the first full-time rock writer for The New York Times, serving as chief pop music critic at the newspaper from 1976 to 1988. According to National Public Radio, Palmer was the Times's "first full-time rock writer".

In 1985, he was recruited by friends Keith Richards and Ronnie Wood to play clarinet on the song "Silver and Gold" by U2's Bono for the Artists United Against Apartheid album Sun City.

Palmer began teaching courses in ethnomusicology and American music at colleges, including at the University of Mississippi. In the early 1990s, he started producing blues albums for Fat Possum Records artists, such as R. L. Burnside and Junior Kimbrough. Following a residence from 1988 through 1992 near Memphis, he spent about six months at a country estate near Little Rock before finally relocating in early 1993 to New Orleans, Louisiana, where he lived until his death.

He worked as screenwriter, narrator, and music director of two documentary films The World According to John Coltrane (that he also directed, with Toby Byron) and Deep Blues (based on his book by the same name). He was heavily involved in the 1995 WGBH/BBC co-production Rock & Roll, broadcast in the United States in late 1995 on PBS.

== Works ==
=== Literary works ===
Two of his better-known books are the historical study Deep Blues (Penguin, 1982) and Rock & Roll: An Unruly History (Harmony, 1995), the latter of which was the companion book to the ten-part BBC and PBS television documentary series Rock & Roll (aka Dancing in the Street) on which he served as chief consultant. He wrote a book about Jerry Lee Lewis, titled Jerry Lee Lewis Rocks. A collection of his writings entitled Blues & Chaos: The Music Writing of Robert Palmer, edited by Anthony DeCurtis, was posthumously published by Simon & Schuster on November 10, 2009.

== Death and legacy ==
Palmer died from liver disease at the Westchester County Medical Center in Valhalla, New York, on November 20, 1997.

His daughter, Augusta Palmer, directed a documentary called The Hand of Fatima (2009) about Palmer's lifelong relationship with the Master Musicians of Jajouka.

== Sources ==
- Dougan, John. "Insect Trust biography.". Allmusic. Accessed December 9, 2004.
- Wertheimer, Linda (November 20, 1997). "All Things Considered: Robert Palmer" (audio). NPR. Accessed December 9, 2004.
- Decurtis, Anthony (2009). "Flirtations with chaos". Blues & Chaos: The Music Writing of Robert Palmer.
- John Sinclair (1993). "Robert Palmer: Site-Specific Music [interview]". Johnsinclair.us. Archived from the original on June 26, 2015.
- Robert Palmer collection at Tulane University. Includes a collection of digitized photographs.
