= North Mississippi Allstars discography =

- Studio albums: 13
- EPs: 4
- Live albums: 9
- Compilation albums: 3
- Video albums: 1

This is a discography of American blues rock band North Mississippi Allstars.

== Studio albums ==
List of studio albums, with selected chart positions
Title	Album details	Peak chart positions								
Title	Album details	US	US Current	US Rock	US Folk	US Blues	US Sales	US Indie	US Heat.	US Taste
Shake Hands with Shorty	Released: May 9, 2000; Label: Tone-Cool Records	—	—	—	—	—	—	—	—	—
51 Phantom	Released: October 9, 2001; Label: Tone-Cool Records	—	—	—	—	—	—	20	29	—
Polaris	Released: April 22, 2003; Label: Tone-Cool Records	—	—	—	—	—	—	—	15	—
Electric Blue Watermelon	Released: September 6, 2005; Label: ATO Records	180	180	—	—	1	180	—	8	—
Hernando	Released: January 22, 2008; Label: Songs of the South Records	142	142	—	—	1	142	19	3	12
Keys to the Kingdom	Released: February 1, 2011; Label: Songs of the South Records	—	175	46	—	2	—	27	4	14
I'm Just Dead I'm Not Gone (with James Luther Dickinson)	Released: July 3, 2012; Label: Memphis International Records	—	—	—	—	—	—	—	—	—
World Boogie Is Coming	Released: September 3, 2013; Label: Songs of the South Records	146	132	44	—	3	146	32	2	14
Freedom & Dreams (with Anders Osborne)	Released: September 3, 2015; Label: NMO Records	—	—	—	—	9	—	—	—	—
Prayer for Peace	Released: June 2, 2017; Label: Songs of the South Records	—	77	—	19	1	—	—	4	13
Up and Rolling	Released: October 4, 2019; Label: New West Records	—	66	—	—	2	78	24	3	15
Set Sail	Released: January 28, 2022; Label: New West Records	—	51	—	—	1	—	—	—	—
Still Shakin'	Released: June 6, 2025; Label: New West Records	—	—	—	—	4	—	—	—	—
"—" denotes releases that did not chart, or was not released in that country.

== Extended plays ==
Title	Album details
Shimmy She Wobble	Released: 2000; Label: Blanco y Negro Records
Instores & Outtakes	Released: 2004; Label: ATO Records
Electric Blue Watermelon Screwed and Chopped EP	Released: 2005; Label: ATO Records
Upstairs at United, Vol. 4	Released: 2012; Label: 453 Music

== Live albums ==
List of live albums, with selected chart positions
Title	Album details	Peak chart positions	
Title	Album details	US Blues	US Heat.
Hill Country Revue (Live at Bonnaroo)	Released: 2004; Label: ATO Records	2	—
Paradise Boston, Ma 11.12.05 (Instant Live)	Released: 2006; Label: ATO Records	—	—
Do It Like We Used to Do (Live '96-'08)	Released: 2009; Label: Songs of the South Records	4	30
Live in the Hills 6.26.10	Released: 2010; Label: Songs of the South Records	—	—
Boulderado: Live at the Fox 2008	Released: 2010; Label: Songs of the South Records	9	—
11.11.11 Live - Bluebird Theatre Denver, CO	Released: 2011; Label: Songs of the South Records	—	—
Live in the Hills II 6.24.11	Released: 2011; Label: Songs of the South Records	—	—
Live at 2003 Wanee Music Festival	Released: 2013; Label: MunckMix	—	—
Live at 2014 New Orleans Jazz & Heritage Festival	Released: 2014; Label: MunckMix	—	—
"—" denotes releases that did not chart, or was not released in that country.

== Compilation albums ==
Title	Album details
Tate County Hill Country Blues	Released: 2003
The Early Years	Released: 2006; Label: Tone-Cool Records; 2-CD; Reissue of the albums Shake Hands with Shorty and 51 Phantom
Songs of the South Presents: Mississippi Folk Music - Volume One	Released: 2007; Label: Songs of the South Records

== Video albums ==
Title	Album details
Keep on Marchin' (Live in Burlington, VT 11.11.05)	Released: 2007; Label: Songs of the South Records

== Guest appearances ==
Title	Year	Other performers	Album
"All Night Long"	2001	N/A	High Times Presents Rip This Joint
"Whiskey Rock a Roller"	2004	N/A	Under the Influence: A Jam Band Tribute to Lynyrd Skynyrd
"Mean Ol' Wind Died Down"	2007	N/A	Black Snake Moan: Original Motion Picture Soundtrack
"Goin Back to Dixie"	2007	N/A	Snoop Dogg's Hood of Horror (Original Motion Picture Soundtrack)
"Waking Up in Paradise"	2012	Cisco Adler	Aloha
"If I Was Jesus"	2012	N/A	Mercyland: Hymns for the Rest of Us
"Wish I Had Answered"	2014	Mavis Staples	Take Me to the River: Music from the Motion Picture
"I've Been Buked"	2014	Mavis Staples	Take Me to the River: Music from the Motion Picture
"Freight Train to Nowhere"	2017	N/A	Treasure of the Broken Land: The Songs of Mark Heard
