= Amy LaVere =

American musician

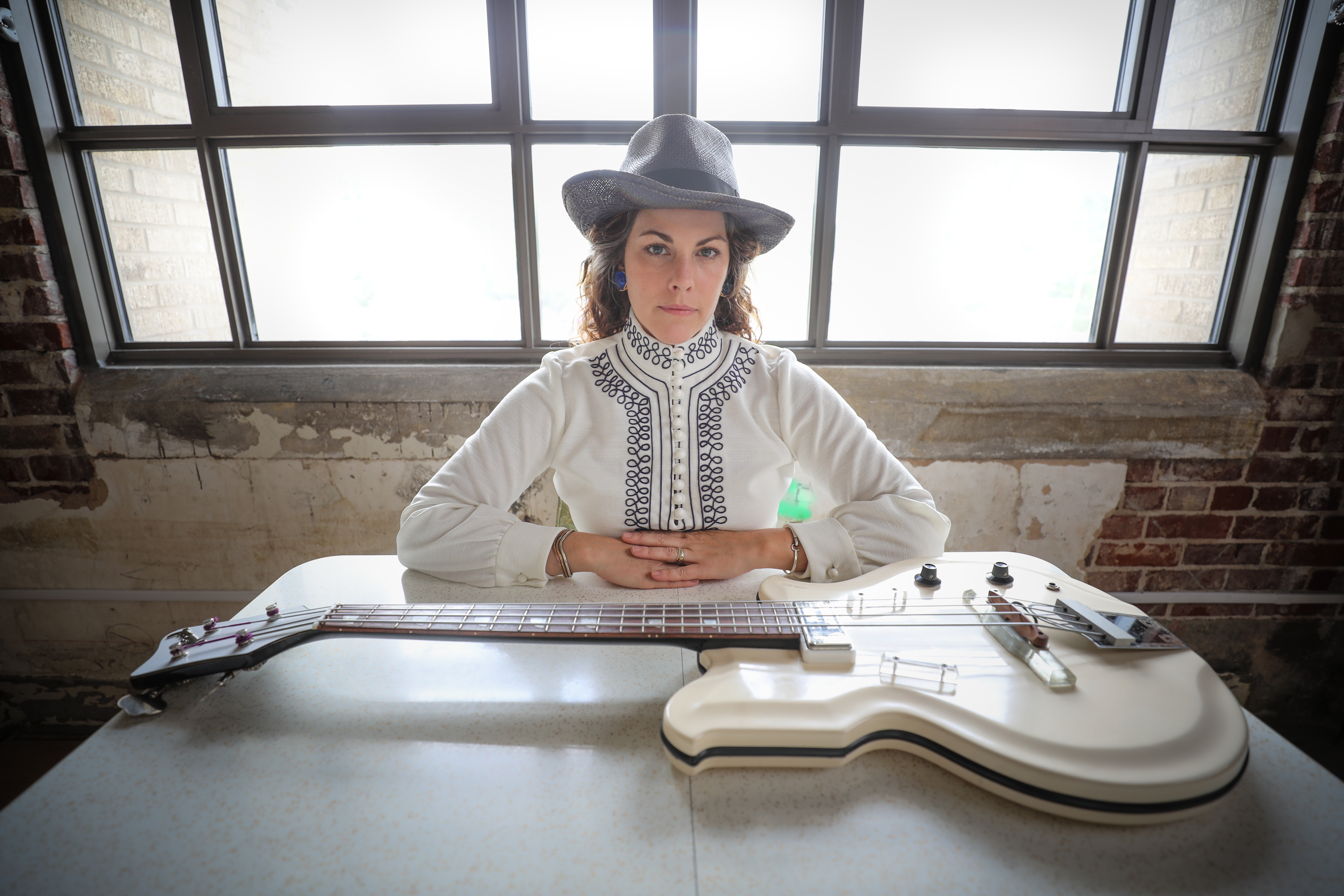

Background information
- Born: Amy LaVere Fant; Shreveport, Louisiana, U.S.
- Genre: Americana
- Instruments: Vocals; upright bass
- Years active: 1990s–present
- Website: amylavere.com

Amy LaVere is an American singer, songwriter, and upright bass player based in Memphis, Tennessee. Her music is classified as Americana. She has released six albums on Memphis label Archer Records.

== Early life ==
LaVere was born in Shreveport, Louisiana, and grew up in Bethany, Louisiana, a small Texas–Louisiana border town in the Piney Woods region, nurtured by musical parents with a passion for traditional country music. Her family moved 13 times by the time she entered high school, ultimately landing in Detroit where LaVere fronted the alt rockband Last Minute while still in her teens.

== Career ==
The early 1990s found LaVere in Nashville as part of the burgeoning Lower Broadway scene, where she began to play upright bass as half of the popular roots duo The Gabe & Amy Show. By 1999, she had moved to Memphis where she began work at Sun Studio.

In early 2006, LaVere released her debut album This World Is Not My Home on indie label Archer Records to instant national acclaim. She was joined on her album by many accomplished artists, including southern bluesman Jimbo Mathus, formerly of the Squirrel Nut Zippers. The Los Angeles Daily News raved at the time, "Something like this doesn't come along every day." LaVere also began a nascent acting career starting with her cameo as Rockabilly queen Wanda Jackson in Walk The Line and continued with featured role in Craig Brewer's Black Snake Moan.

In 2007, LaVere went into the studio with producer, Jim Dickinson to record her second album, Anchors & Anvils. Dickinson captured LaVere and band at his Zebra Ranch recording barn 'art project' in rural Mississippi.

Archer Records released Anchors and Anvils in May 2007. Her second album rose to number six on the Americana Music Charts and earned LaVere a nomination for the Americana Music Association Awards' Best New Or Emerging Artist. She toured the United States from coast to coast, played a series of dates with The Swell Season, performed at the Austin City Limits Festival, and shared the stage at the Americana Music Conference with Lyle Lovett, Todd Snider, and others.

On October 1, 2008, she opened for Seasick Steve at the Royal Albert Hall in London. In 2009 she opened for musical group Lucero on their 1372 Overton Park US Tour and also toured as a special guest with Seasick Steve.

In 2011, LaVere released her third album Stranger Me to critical acclaim. Spin Magazine called it "the breakup album of the year." Q Magazine, the Daily Mirror and The Sun all awarded it four stars. Paste Magazine said: "LaVere could rest on her lyrics alone, which are witty and feisty enough to stand on their own, but by giving her band boundless license to indulge any whim or eccentricity, she has crafted a well-rounded album that is already among the year's best."

In July 2011, LaVere and her band (guitarist David Cousar, violinist/keyboardist Krista Wroten-Combest and drummer Shawn Zorn), promoted the UK release of Stranger Me in London and France. On September 28, 2011, LaVere was named "Best Singer in Memphis" for the second consecutive year by the city of Memphis, Tennessee.

In the spring of 2012, LaVere joined band leader Luther Dickinson (of The North Mississippi Allstars), guitarist Shannon McNally, banjo player Valerie June and drummer and fife player Sharde Thomas, in the quintet bluegrass group, The Wandering. They released their debut album "Go On Now, You Can't Stay Here", and spent the spring of 2012 touring after the record's release. LaVere and McNally have partnered up to tour as a duo in October 2012 as part of their "Chasing the Ghost" tour.

In 2013 LaVere teamed up with Memphis musician John Paul Keith and longtime live drummer Shawn Zorn, performing and recording as "Motel Mirrors".

In 2014 Amy released her 6th Studio record "Runaway's Diary". It was produced by Luther Dickinson

In 2019 Amy released her 7th studio record "Painting Blue" This record was produced by her husband Will Sexton

To date Amy continues to tour and write music.

== Discography ==
- 2006: This World Is Not My Home
- 2007: Anchors and Anvils
- 2009: Died of Love (EP)
- 2011: Stranger Me
- 2014: Runaway's Diary
- 2015: Hallelujah I'm a Dreamer (live album)
- 2019: Painting Blue

== Watch ==
Amy LaVere quartet performance on November 30, 2011, at Sportsmens Tavern and Music Hall in Buffalo, New York: Set 1. Set 2
