= World Boogie Is Coming =

Studio album by North Mississippi Allstars
- Released: September 3, 2013
- Studios: Arlyn Studios (Austin, TX); Zebra Ranch (Independence, MS)
- Genres: Southern rock; blues rock; americana; retro-rock; roots rock
- Length: 58:17
- Label: Songs of the South
- Producers: Cody Dickinson; Luther Dickinson

North Mississippi Allstars chronology
I'm Just Dead I'm Not Gone (2012)	World Boogie Is Coming (2013)	Freedom & Dreams (2015)

World Boogie Is Coming is the eighth studio album by American band North Mississippi Allstars. It was released on September 3, 2013 via Songs of the South Records. Recording sessions took place at Arlyn Studios in Austin and at Zebra Ranch Studios in Independence. Production was handled by Cody and Luther Dickinson.

== Critical reception ==
Professional ratings
Aggregate scores
Source	Rating
Metacritic	79/100
Review scores
Source	Rating
AllMusic	4/5 stars
American Songwriter	4/5 stars
Blurt	3/5 stars
Los Angeles Times	3.5/4 stars
The Guardian	3/5 stars

World Boogie Is Coming was met with generally favorable reviews from music critics. At Metacritic, which assigns a normalized rating out of 100 to reviews from mainstream publications, the album received an average score of 79, based on nine reviews.

AllMusic's Steve Leggett praised the album, saying: "NMA's version of Junior Kimbrough's "Meet Me in the City" here almost sounds like power pop, but filtered through a rustic moonshine filter. Every track here is like that, roaring into the 21st century sounding big, urgent, and huge, but so grounded in the local folk-blues tradition that each track seems to carry imprinted DNA that says boogie all over it". Randall Roberts of Los Angeles Times found the album "chaotic and expansive in the best sense: The Allstars attack many blues and southern rock ideas--and let loose doing it. As a result, World Boogie feels like a journey". Hal Horowitz of American Songwriter wrote: "By smartly abandoning the hip-hop and indie rock impulses that have appeared on, and arguably watered down, previous NMAS releases, the brothers Dickinson focus on what they do best; grind out muddy boogie with the pulsating, sweat soaked intensity of those that originated the rustic music they clearly love". Fred Mills of Blurt wrote: "their latest, crammed with 17 tracks, will likely be a case of too much of a good thing for all but the hardcore fans". Robin Denselow of The Guardian wrote: "the album succeeds because it has a freshness, raw energy and attack reminiscent of the way Mama Rosin re-work Cajun music".

== Track listing ==
No.	Title	Writer(s)	Length
1.	"JR"	David Kimbrough	2:40
2.	"Goat Meat"	Luther Dickinson; Steve Malcolm	3:45
3.	"Rollin 'n Tumblin"	Traditional	2:35
4.	"Boogie"	Traditional	3:53
5.	"Get the Snakes Out the Woods"	R. L. Burnside; North Mississippi Allstars	0:37
6.	"Snake Drive"	R. L. Burnside	2:47
7.	"That Dog After That Rabbit"	Othar Turner; North Mississippi Allstars	0:32
8.	"Meet Me in the City"	David Kimbrough	4:36
9.	"Turn Up Satan"	Luther Dickinson; Cody Dickinson; Chris Chew	4:41
10.	"Shimmy"	Othar Turner	3:01
11.	"My Babe"	William James Dixon	1:26
12.	"Granny, Does Your Dog Bite"	Othar Turner; Shardé Thomas	2:00
13.	"World Boogie"	Booker T. Washington White	4:04
14.	"Goin' to Brownsville"	John Adam Estes; Walter E. Lewis	6:51
15.	"I'm Leaving"	David Kimbrough	3:45
16.	"Jumper on the Line"	R. L. Burnside	10:03
17.	"Cuttin' Shorty"	Cody Dickinson; Steve Malcolm	1:01
Total length:			58:17

== Charts ==
Chart performance for World Boogie Is Coming
Chart (2013)	Peak position
US Billboard 200	146
US Top Rock Albums (Billboard)	44
US Top Blues Albums (Billboard)	3
US Independent Albums (Billboard)	32
US Heatseekers Albums (Billboard)	2
US Indie Store Album Sales (Billboard)	14
