= Up and Rolling =

Up And Rolling

Studio album by North Mississippi Allstars
- Released: October 4, 2019
- Studios: Zebra Ranch (Independence, MS); Checkerboard Lounge (Southaven, MS); Sputnik Sound (Nashville, TN); Chicago Recording Company (Chicago, IL); Harmony Hill Recordings (Nashville, TN); Brooklyn Recording (New York, NY); Pacific View Studio (Los Angeles, CA)
- Genre: Blues rock
- Length: 44:50
- Label: New West
- Producers: Cody Dickinson; Luther Dickinson

North Mississippi Allstars chronology
Prayer for Peace (2017)	Up And Rolling (2019)	Set Sail (2022)

Up and Rolling is the tenth studio album by American band North Mississippi Allstars. It was released on October 4, 2019, through New West Records, making it their first album for the label.

Production was handled entirely by Cody and Luther Dickinson, assisted by Kody Harrell, except for the song "Living Free" co-produced by Lawrence "Boo" Mitchell. It features contributions from Tierinii and Tikyra Jackson of Southern Avenue, Cedric and Garry Burnside, Charles Hodges, Mavis Staples, Jason Isbell, Othar Turner, Duane Betts and Roosevelt Collier.

In the United States, the album made it to several Billboard charts, peaking at No. 66 on the Current Album Sales, No. 78 on the Top Album Sales, No. 2 on the Top Blues Albums, No. 24 on the Independent Albums, No. 3 on the Heatseekers Albums and No. 15 on the Tastemakers.

In 2020, the album was nominated for a Blues Music Award for Blues Rock Album at the 41st Blues Music Awards and for a Grammy Award for Best Contemporary Blues Album at the 63rd Annual Grammy Awards, but lost to Albert Castiglia's Masterpiece and Fantastic Negrito's Have You Lost Your Mind Yet? respectively.

== Recording ==
The record was partially inspired by old photographs taken by Texan photographer Wyatt McSpadden in 1996, who visited the Dickinson brothers around the time of formation the North Mississippi Allstars to document the hill country blues scene in the Magnolia State. The images inspired the Dickinsons to revisit the sound of regionally renowned artists like Otha Turner and Junior Kimbrough ("Lonesome in My Home") that were hugely influential on their band.

Unlike the previous album, 2017's Prayer for Peace, this one saw an increase in the band's lineup. The Dickinson brothers duo were joined by bassist Carl DuFrene, fife player Shardé Thomas and vocalist Sharisse Norman. Previously, DuFrene was one of the guest musicians on the 2015 album Freedom & Dreams, while Thomas and Norman were featured on Prayer for Peace.

Main recording sessions took place at Zebra Ranch Studios in Independence, Mississippi with Kevin Houston. Mavis' vocals were recorded March 11, 2019 at Chicago Recording Company by engineer Mat Lejeune, assisted by Jonathan Lackey. "What You Gonna Do?" and "Mean Old World" were recorded at Sputnik Sound in Nashville by Vance Powell, assisted by Mike Fahey. "Take My Hand, Precious Lord" and additional drums were recorded at Checkerboard Lounge in Southaven by Cody Dickinson. "Out on the Road" was recorded at Harmony Hill Recordings in Nashville by Luther Dickinson, at Brooklyn Recording in New York by Andy Taub and at Checkerboard Lounge in Southaven by Cody Dickinson. Betts' guitar part was recorded at Pacific View Studio in Los Angeles by Stoll Vaughan.

On June 26, 2019 Paste magazine premiered the first single from then-upcoming album - a cover of The Staple Singers’ "What You Gonna Do" from their 1965 album Freedom Highway. Along with the song, release date, track listing, cover art, and tour dates were revealed.

== Critical reception ==
Professional ratings
Aggregate scores
Source	Rating
Metacritic	84/100
Review scores
Source	Rating
AllMusic	4/5 stars
American Songwriter	4/5 stars

Up and Rolling was met with universal acclaim from music critics. At Metacritic, which assigns a normalized rating out of 100 to reviews from mainstream publications, the album received an average score of 84, based on four reviews.

AllMusic's Thom Jurek said that the album "clears away decades of cobwebs, dust, and wisteria vines from the doorway to the past: It's a family reunion offering that looks to the Hill Country's history and mystery for both its inspiration from the past and guidance to its present". Hal Horowitz of American Songwriter praised the album saying: "It's an album that both looks backward and forward, reprising the dusky feel of the music that first inspired the Dickinson brothers to start their band while pushing it into electric boogie and even psychedelic directions its founders might not have imagined". Doug Collette of Glide found the album "decidedly tighter and more focused piece of work than their last two albums". Uncut reviewer stated: "a passionate and muscular record that oozes cool in every note".

With four out of five star rating given, the album was chosen as one of AllMusic's 'Favorite Blues Album's.

== Track listing ==
No.	Title	Writer(s)	Length
1.	"Call That Gone"	Luther Dickinson; Cody Dickinson; Carl DuFrene; Shardé Thomas; Othar Turner	4:44
2.	"Up and Rolling"	L. Dickinson	5:03
3.	"What You Gonna Do?" (featuring Mavis Staples)	Roebuck Staples	3:21
4.	"Drunk Outdoors"	L. Dickinson	3:37
5.	"Peaches"	R. L. Burnside	5:17
6.	"Mean Old World" (featuring Jason Isbell and Duane Betts)	Walter Jacobs	6:32
7.	"Out on the Road" (featuring Cedric Burnside)	R. L. Burnside	2:18
8.	"Lonesome in My Home"	David Kimbrough	3:06
9.	"Bump That Mother"	L. Dickinson; C. Dickinson; Thomas; Gregory Edward Hart; Steve Malcolm	3:11
10.	"Living Free"	L. Dickinson; C. Dickinson; Lawrence Mitchell	3:56
11.	"Take My Hand, Precious Lord" (featuring Cedric Burnside)	Thomas A. Dorsey	3:07
12.	"Otha’s Bye Bye Baby" (featuring Othar Turner)	L. Dickinson; Turner	0:38
Total length:			44:50

== Personnel ==
- Cody Dickinson – drums, Wurlitzer organ, bass, vocals, producer, recording (tracks: 7, 11)
- Luther Dickinson – guitar, vocals, producer, recording (track 7)
- Carl DuFrene – bass
- Shardé Thomas – fife, vocals
- Sharisse Norman – vocals
- Tierinii Jackson – vocals (tracks: 3, 4, 10)
- Tikyra Jackson – vocals (tracks: 3, 4, 10)
- Mavis Staples – vocals (track 3)
- Jason Isbell – vocals and guitar (track 6)
- Cedric Burnside – vocals and guitar (tracks: 7, 11)
- Othar Turner – vocals (track 12)
- Charles Hodges – Hammond B3 organ (tracks: 3, 10)
- Duane Betts – guitar (track 6)
- Garry Burnside – bass (track 8)
- Roosevelt Collier – steel guitar (track 9)
- Lawrence "Boo" Mitchell – co-producer (track 10)
- Kody Harrell – assistant producer
- Kevin Houston – recording, post-production editing
- Chad Cuttill – post-production editing
- Tom Roach – mixing
- Mat Lejeune – engineering (track 3)
- Jonathan Lackey – engineering assistant (track 3)
- Vance Powell – recording (track 3, 6)
- Mike Fahey – recording assistant (track 3, 6)
- Stoll Vaughan – recording (track 6)
- Andy Taub – recording (track 7)
- Tom Woodhead – mastering
- Tom Bejgrowicz – art direction, design, layout
- Wyatt McSpadden – photography
- Jeff Stockton – photography assistant
- Stuart McSpadden – photography assistant
- Ernest Suarez – liner notes

== Charts ==
Chart performance for Up And Rolling
Chart (2019)	Peak position
US Current Album Sales (Billboard)	66
US Top Album Sales (Billboard)	78
US Top Blues Albums (Billboard)	2
US Independent Albums (Billboard)	24
US Heatseekers Albums (Billboard)	3
US Indie Store Album Sales (Billboard)	15
