= Electric Blue Watermelon =

Studio album by North Mississippi Allstars
- Released: September 6, 2005
- Studio: Ardent Studios (Memphis, TN); Zebra Ranch (Independence, MS); Sam Phillips Recording Studio (Memphis, TN)
- Genre: Southern rock; blues rock; roots rock
- Length: 49:17
- Label: ATO
- Producer: Jim Dickinson

North Mississippi Allstars chronology
Polaris (2003)	Electric Blue Watermelon (2005)	Hernando (2008)

Electric Blue Watermelon is the fourth studio album by American band North Mississippi Allstars. It was released on September 6, 2005, through ATO Records. The recording sessions took place at Ardent Studios and at Sam Phillips Recording Studio in Memphis, Tennessee, and at Zebra Ranch in Independence, Mississippi. The album was produced by Jim Dickinson. It features contributions from Lucinda Williams, Robert Randolph, Al Kapone, Othar Turner, Jimbo Mathus, Ben Nichols, Jimmy Davis, Jim Crosthwait, Jim Spake, Steve Selvidge, Susan Marshall, Mary Lindsay Dickinson, John C. Stubblefield, R.L. Boyce, Sharde Turner, Aubrey Turner, Rodney Evans, Otha Andre Evans, Whitney Jefferson, Robert "Tex" Wrightsil, Harold "Sundance" Thomas, Roger Lewis, Kevin Harris, Efrem Towns, Terence Higgins, Julius McKee, Revert Andrews, Jamie McLean, and Jim Dickinson.

The album made it to number 180 on the Billboard 200, topped the Top Blues Albums and peaked at number 8 on the Heatseekers Albums. It was also nominated for a Grammy Award for Best Contemporary Blues Album at the 48th Annual Grammy Awards, but lost to Delbert McClinton's Cost of Living.

== Critical reception ==
Professional ratings
Aggregate scores
Source	Rating
Metacritic	79/100
Review scores
Source	Rating
AllMusic	4/5 stars
Robert Christgau	(2-star Honorable Mention)
Entertainment Weekly	B+
PopMatters	8/10

Electric Blue Watermelon was met with generally favorable reviews from music critics. At Metacritic, which assigns a normalized rating out of 100 to reviews from mainstream publications, the album received an average score of 79, based on eleven reviews.

Tom Sinclair of Entertainment Weekly found the album "it's sort of like The Allman Brothers Band jamming with the P-Funk All Stars, with LL Cool J guesting". AllMusic's Steve Leggett praised the album, saying: "what they really are is a 21st century version of a good old Southern rock band who know all too well that the hills of North Mississippi are alive with real folk music". Adrien Begrand of PopMatters said that the album "expertly combines elements of the previous three albums with a few cool new additions, making for not only the most diverse concoction of blues and rock the band has recorded to date, but also their best album so far". Veteran critic Robert Christgau said: "They've learned to lilt, or else agreed to let their daddy show them how" and selected two songs: "Hurry Up Sunrise" and "Bang Bang Lulu".

== Track listing ==
No.	Title	Writer(s)	Length
1.	"Mississippi Boll Weevil"	Charley Patton	2:48
2.	"No Mo"	North Mississippi Allstars	4:56
3.	"Teasin' Brown"	Othar Turner; Luther Dickinson; Duwayne Burnside	3:38
4.	"Moonshine"	NMA	4:18
5.	"Hurry Up Sunrise"	Othar Turner · Luther Dickinson	4:58
6.	"Stompin' My Foot"	Luther Dickinson; Alphonzo Bailey	3:37
7.	"Bang Bang Lulu"	Luther Dickinson (add.); James Luther Dickinson (add.); Lee Baker (add.)	4:03
8.	"Deep Blue Sea"	Odetta Gordon	3:52
9.	"Mean Ol' Wind Died Down"	NMA	7:22
10.	"Horseshoe"	NMA	5:02
11.	"Bounce Ball"	Othar Turner	4:43
Total length:			49:17

== Personnel ==
- Luther Dickinson – guitar, vocals
- Cody Dickinson – drums
- Chris Crew – bass, vocals
- Jim "East Memphis Slim" Dickinson – producer, guest artist
- Pete Matthews – recording
- Stewart Whitmore – editing
- Stephen Marcussen – mastering
- Tom Foster – artwork
- Emily Philpott – design, layout
- Lucinda Williams – guest artist
- Robert Randolph – guest artist
- Al Kapone – guest artist
- Othar Turner – guest artist
- Jimbo Mathus – guest artist
- Ben Nichols – guest artist
- Jimmy Davis – guest artist
- Jim Crosthwait – guest artist
- Jim Spake – guest artist
- Steve Selvidge – guest artist
- Susan Marshall – guest artist
- Mary Lindsay Dickinson – guest artist
- John C. Stubblefield – guest artist
- R.L. Boyce – guest artist
- Sharde Turner – guest artist
- Aubrey Turner – guest artist
- Rodney Evans – guest artist
- Otha Andre Evans – guest artist
- Whitney Jefferson – guest artist
- Robert "Tex" Wrightsil – guest artist
- Harold "Sundance" Thomas – guest artist
- Roger Lewis – guest artist
- Kevin Harris – guest artist
- Efrem Towns – guest artist
- Terence Higgins – guest artist
- Julius McKee – guest artist
- Revert Andrews – guest artist
- Jamie McLean – guest artist

== Charts ==
Chart performance for Electric Blue Watermelon
Chart (2005)	Peak position
US Billboard 200	180
US Top Blues Albums (Billboard)	1
US Heatseekers Albums (Billboard)	8
