= Runaway's Diary =

Studio album by Amy LaVere
- Released: May 27, 2014
- Genre: Americana
- Label: Archer Records, Thirty Tigers
- Producer: Luther Dickinson

Amy LaVere chronology
| Stranger Me (2011) | Runaway's Diary (2014) | Painting Blue (2019) |

Runaway's Diary is the fourth studio album by Memphis, Tennessee-based singer-songwriter Amy LaVere. It was released on May 27, 2014 by both Archer Records and Thirty Tigers, and was produced by Luther Dickinson.

== Critical reception ==
Professional ratings
Aggregate scores
| Source | Rating |
|---|---|
| Metacritic | 85/100 |
Review scores
| Source | Rating |
| AllMusic | 4/5 stars |
| No Depression | (favorable) |
| American Songwriter | 3.5/5 stars |
| Robert Christgau | (A−) |
| The Guardian | 4/5 stars |

Runaway's Diary has a score of 85 out of 100 on Metacritic, based on 5 reviews, indicating that it has received "universal acclaim" from critics. Jon Dennis of The Guardian gave the album 4 out of 5 stars, writing that Lavere's "longstanding penchant for storytelling songs is given free rein" on the album. He concluded by saying, "considering the subject matter, this is an upbeat album, as if LaVere is looking back on her youthful adventures with a twinkle in her eye."

== Track listing ==
1. "Rabbit" – 5:00
2. "Last Rock N Roll Boy to Dance" – 3:08
3. "Big Sister" – 4:09
4. "Self Made Orphan" – 3:57
5. "Where I Lead Me" – 3:26
6. "Snowflake" – 2:31
7. "How?" – 3:43
8. "Don't Go Yet John" – 2:05
9. "Lousy Pretender" – 3:30
10. "Dark Moon" – 2:38
11. "I'll Be Home Soon" – 3:30
12. "Reprise" – 0:44
