= Prayer for Peace (North Mississippi Allstars album) =

Studio album by North Mississippi Allstars
- Released: June 2, 2017
- Recorded: 2017
- Studio: Royal Studios (Memphis, TN); Brooklyn Studios (New York, NY); Harmony Hill (Nashville, TN); Music Shed Studio (New Orleans, LA); Zebra Ranch Studios (Independence, MS); Sawhorse Studios (St. Louis, MO); Weights and Measures (Kansas City, MO); Arly Studios (Austin, TX)
- Genre: Southern rock; blues rock; americana; boogie rock; roots rock
- Length: 42:36
- Label: Songs of the South
- Producer: Cody Dickinson; Luther Dickinson

North Mississippi Allstars chronology
Freedom & Dreams (2015)	Prayer for Peace (2017)	Up and Rolling (2019)

Prayer for Peace is the ninth studio album by American band North Mississippi Allstars. It was released on June 2, 2017, via Songs of the South Records, making it their final record for the label. Recording sessions took place at Royal Studios in Memphis, Brooklyn Studios in New York City, Harmony Hill in Nashville, Music Shed Studio in New Orleans, Zebra Ranch Studios in Independence, Sawhorse Studios in St. Louis, Weights and Measures in Kansas City, and Arly Studios in Austin. Production was handled by Cody and Luther Dickinson with co-producer Lawrence "Boo" Mitchell.

In the United States, the album made it to several Billboard charts, peaking at No. 77 on the Current Album Sales, No. 19 on the Top Americana/Folk Albums, No. 1 on the Top Blues Albums, No. 4 on the Heatseekers Albums and No. 13 on the Tastemakers.

At the 39th Blues Music Awards held in 2018, the album was nominated for a Blues Music Award for Blues Rock Album, while the band was nominated for a Blues Music Award for Band of the Year.

== Critical reception ==
Professional ratings
Aggregate scores
Source	Rating
Metacritic	80/100
Review scores
Source	Rating
AllMusic	4/5 stars
American Songwriter	4/5 stars
GIGsoup	73%
Tom Hull	B+
Vice	(3-star Honorable Mention)

Prayer for Peace was met with universal acclaim from music critics. At Metacritic, which assigns a normalized rating out of 100 to reviews from mainstream publications, the album received an average score of 80, based on four reviews.

AllMusic's Thom Jurek praised the album, citing the music as eternal, and said that the band's "obvious reverence for it is shown in how easily they just let it come through." Jurek elaborated that "no matter where it was recorded or who plays on it", the album felt the same− "Open, willing, and wooly". Hal Horowitz of American Songwriter felt that though there weren't any revelations on the album, yet "the energy, excitement and intensity poured into every performance" made it standout "in an impressive Dickinson brothers catalog that doesn't have any weak entries". Uncut reviewer wrote: "Luther and Cody Dickinson strip it back on Prayer For Peace, recording in a half-dozen American cities and viscerally capturing the widespread unease". Magnet reviewer found out the album's "rootsy sound remains more or less unchanged and identified". Writing for Vice, veteran music critic Robert Christgau wrote: "Never much shakes with songs per se, they put their minds into an entreaty their South needs, their hearts into their South's African-American repertoire, and their guitars into Will Shade's greatest hit".

== Track listing ==
No.	Title	Writer(s)	Length
1.	"Prayer for Peace"	Luther Dickinson; Cody Dickinson; Oteil Burbridge	3:40
2.	"Need to Be Free"	L. Dickinson; David Kimbrough	4:28
3.	"Miss Maybelle"	R. L. Burnside	2:40
4.	"Run Red Rooster"	Burnside; L. Dickinson	2:20
5.	"Stealin'"	William Shade Jr.	2:54
6.	"Deep Ellum"	Traditional	4:19
7.	"Bird Without a Feather"	Burnside	4:34
8.	"You Got to Move"	Fred McDowell	2:03
9.	"61 Highway"	McDowell	3:05
10.	"Long Haired Doney"	Burnside	4:39
11.	"Bid You Goodnight"	Traditional	5:02
12.	"P4P2017"	L. Dickinson; C. Dickinson; Burbridge	2:52
Total length:			42:36

== Personnel ==
- Cody Dickinson – drums, piano, synth bass, programming, vocals, producer, remixing (track 12)
- Luther Dickinson – guitars, vocals, producer
- Shardé Thomas – vocals and fife (track 1)
- Sharisse Norman – vocals (track 6)
- Danielle Nicole – bass and vocals (track 8)
- Grahame Lesh – vocals (track 11)
- Oteil Burbridge – bass (tracks: 1, 11)
- Kenny Brown – guitar (track 4)
- Dominic Davis – upright and truetone bass (tracks: 5, 6)
- Lawrence "Boo" Mitchell – co-producer and recording (tracks: 3, 4, 8–10)
- Kevin Houston – recording (tracks: 1, 5, 11), post-production editing
- Andy Taub – recording (tracks: 1, 11)
- Chad Cuttill – recording (tracks: 1, 11)
- Ben Iorio – recording (tracks: 2, 7)
- Jason McEntire – recording (track 6)
- Duane Trower – recording (track 8)
- Jacob Sciba – recording
- Chris Bell – mixing
- Gavin Lurssen – mastering
- Tom Bejgrowicz – art direction, design, photography
- Chris Tetzeli – management
- Pete Frostic – management
- Josh Grier – legal
- Matt Hickey – booking

== Charts ==
Chart performance for Prayer For Peace
Chart (2017)	Peak position
US Current Album Sales (Billboard)	77
US Americana/Folk Albums (Billboard)	19
US Top Blues Albums (Billboard)	1
US Heatseekers Albums (Billboard)	4
US Indie Store Album Sales (Billboard)	13
