= 51 Phantom =

Studio album by North Mississippi Allstars
- Released: October 9, 2001
- Recorded: 2001
- Studio: Zebra Ranch Complex (Tate County, Mississippi)
- Genre: Roots rock
- Length: 43:30
- Label: Tone-Cool
- Producer: Jim Dickinson

North Mississippi Allstars chronology
Shake Hands with Shorty (2000)	51 Phantom (2001)	Polaris (2003)

Professional ratings
Review scores
Source	Rating
AllMusic	3/5 stars
Spin	7/10

51 Phantom is the second studio album by American band North Mississippi Allstars. It was released on October 9, 2001, through Tone-Cool Records. The recording sessions took place at Zebra Ranch Complex in Tate County, Mississippi. The album was produced by Jim Dickinson. It features contributions from Ben Nichols and John C. Stubblefield of Lucero, Brenda Patterson, Jackie Johnson, Susan Marshall, Othar Turner, and Jim Dickinson.

The album found minor success on the US Billboard charts, peaking at number 20 on the Independent Albums and number 29 on the Heatseekers Albums. It was nominated for a Grammy Award for Best Contemporary Blues Album at the 45th Annual Grammy Awards, but lost to Solomon Burke's Don't Give Up on Me.

== Track listing ==
No.	Title	Writer(s)	Length
1.	"51 Phantom"	North Mississippi Allstars	3:19
2.	"Snakes in My Bushes"	NMA	3:44
3.	"Sugartown"	NMA	3:49
4.	"Lord Have Mercy"	David Kimbrough	5:27
5.	"Storm"	NMA	4:20
6.	"Freedom Highway"	Roebuck Staples	3:18
7.	"Circle in the Sky"	NMA	3:34
8.	"Ship"	NMA	5:29
9.	"Leavin'"	NMA	3:17
10.	"Up Over Yonder"	NMA	3:48
11.	"Mud"	NMA; R.L. Boyce; George Hamilton IV	3:25
Total length:			43:30

== Personnel ==
- Cody Dickinson – drums, washboard, guitar (tracks: 5, 11), tambourine (track 5), vocals
- Luther Dickinson – guitar, vocals
- Chris Crew – bass, vocals
- Ben Nichols – backing vocals
- Brenda Patterson – backing vocals
- Jackie Johnson – backing vocals
- Susan Marshall – backing vocals
- John C. Stubblefield – arco bowed bass
- Othar Turner – cane fife
- Jim "East Memphis Slim" Dickinson – piano, omnichord, producer
- Kevin Houston – recording
- John Hampton – mixing
- Chris Ludwinski – mastering
- Ebet Roberts – photography
- Liz Linder – photography

== Charts ==
Chart performance for 51 Phantom
Chart (2001)	Peak position
US Independent Albums (Billboard)	20
US Heatseekers Albums (Billboard)	29
