= Hernando (album) =

Studio album by North Mississippi Allstars
- Released: January 22, 2008
- Studio: Zebra Ranch (Coldwater, MS)
- Genres: Southern rock; blues rock
- Length: 40:25
- Label: Songs of the South
- Producer: Jim Dickinson

North Mississippi Allstars chronology
Electric Blue Watermelon (2005)	Hernando (2008)	Keys to the Kingdom (2011)

Professional ratings
Review scores
Source	Rating
AllMusic	3.5/5 stars
The Austin Chronicle	2.5/5 stars
Robert Christgau	(1-star Honorable Mention)
Entertainment Weekly	B
Slant	3/5 stars

Hernando is the fifth studio album by American band North Mississippi Allstars. It was released on January 22, 2008, through Songs of the South Records. The recording sessions took place at Zebra Ranch Studio in Coldwater, Mississippi. The album was produced by Jim Dickinson. It features contributions from Jimbo Mathus, Jimmy Davis, East Memphis Slim, Kurt "KC" Clayton, and Amy LaVere. The band briefly toured the album across America in 2008.

The album peaked at number 142 on the US Billboard 200, number one on the Top Blues Albums chart, number 19 on the Independent Albums, number three on the Heatseekers Albums and number 12 on the Tastemakers.

== Track listing ==
No.	Title	Writer(s)	Length
1.	"Shake" (featuring Jimbo Mathus)	Cody Dickinson; Luther Dickinson; Christopher Morris Chew; James H. Mathis Jr.	3:00
2.	"Keep the Devil Down"	C. Dickinson; L. Dickinson; Chew; Steve Malcolm	3:50
3.	"Soldier"	C. Dickinson; L. Dickinson; Chew	5:59
4.	"Eaglebird"	C. Dickinson; L. Dickinson; Chew; Aaron Julison; R.L. Boyce	2:17
5.	"I'd Love to Be a Hippy"	William Thomas Dupree; Jim Dickinson	4:54
6.	"Mizzip"	C. Dickinson	2:47
7.	"Blow Out" (featuring Jimbo Mathus and Jimmy Davis)	C. Dickinson; L. Dickinson; Chew	1:34
8.	"Come Go with Me" (featuring Jimbo Mathus)	C. Dickinson; L. Dickinson; Chew; Mathis Jr.	3:35
9.	"Rooster's Blues"	L. Dickinson; Steve Selvidge	3:23
10.	"Take Yo Time, Rodney"	C. Dickinson; L. Dickinson; Chew; Rodney Evans	3:53
11.	"Long Way from Home"	Ed Finney	5:13
Total length:			40:25

== Personnel ==
- Cody Dickinson – drums, electric washboard (track 4), guitar (track 6), vocals
- Luther Dickinson – guitar, vocals
- Chris Crew – bass, vocals
- James "Jimbo Mathus" Mathis Jr. – vocals (tracks: 1, 7, 8)
- Jimmy Davis – vocals (track 7)
- Jim "East Memphis Slim" Dickinson – piano (tracks: 5, 7, 11), producer
- Kurt "KC" Clayton – piano (track 6)
- Amy LaVere – upright bass (track 7)
- Kevin Houston – recording, mixing
- Brad Blackwood – mastering

== Charts ==
Chart performance for Hernando
Chart (2008)	Peak position
US Billboard 200	142
US Top Blues Albums (Billboard)	1
US Independent Albums (Billboard)	19
US Heatseekers Albums (Billboard)	3
US Indie Store Album Sales (Billboard)	12
