= Shake Hands with Shorty =

Studio album by North Mississippi Allstars
- Released: May 9, 2000
- Recorded: 1999
- Studio: Zebra Ranch Studios (Tate County, Mississippi)
- Genres: Americana; blues rock; country blues; roots rock
- Length: 54:11
- Label: Tone-Cool
- Producers: Cody Dickinson; Luther Dickinson

North Mississippi Allstars chronology
Shake Hands with Shorty (2000)	51 Phantom (2001)

Professional ratings
Review scores
Source	Rating
AllMusic	4/5 stars
Robert Christgau	(2-star Honorable Mention)
Tom Hull	B+
The Penguin Guide to Blues Recordings	4/4 stars
PopMatters	6.9/10

Shake Hands with Shorty is the debut studio album by American band North Mississippi Allstars. It was released on May 9, 2000, through Tone-Cool Records. It features contributions from Cedric and Garry Burnside, Othar Turner, Jim Dickinson, Jimmy Crosthwait, Richard "Hombre" Price, Alvin Youngblood Hart, Steve Selvidge, Jimbo Mathus, Tate County Singers, Stu Cole and Greg Humphreys. Recording sessions took place in 1999 at Zebra Ranch Studios in Tate County, Mississippi, except for Price's bass part on the song "K.C. Jones (On The Road Again)" was recorded at House of Bob. Production was handled by Cody and Luther Dickinson.

The album won a Blues Music Award for Best New Artist Debut at the 22nd W.C. Handy Blues Awards. It also was nominated for a Grammy Award for Best Contemporary Blues Album at the 43rd Annual Grammy Awards, but lost to Taj Mahal & The Phantom Blues Band's Shoutin' in Key.

== Track listing ==
Shake Hands with Shorty track listing
No.	Title	Writer(s)	Length
1.	"Shake 'Em On Down"	Booker T. Washington White	4:08
2.	"Drop Down Mama"	Fred McDowell	4:39
3.	"Po Black Maddie"	R. L. Burnside	4:32
4.	"Skinny Woman"	Burnside	5:18
5.	"Drinking Muddy Water"	McDowell	3:21
6.	"Goin' Down South"	Burnside	6:11
7.	"K.C. Jones (On the Road Again)"	Walter E. Lewis	4:36
8.	"Sitting on Top of the World" (Station Blues)	Lonnie Carter; Walter Jacobs	2:40
9.	"Someday Baby"	McDowell	2:30
10.	"All Night Long"	David Kimbrough	16:16
Total length:			54:11

Sample credits

- Track 1 contains samples from Othar Turner and the Rising Star Fife and Drum Band's 1997 album Everybody Hollerin' Goat

Notes

- Track 10 includes a hidden track starting at 9:17 (total time: 6:58)

== Personnel ==
- Cody Dickinson – drums, samplers, guitars (tracks: 1, 7, 10), vocals, producer, mixing
- Luther Dickinson – electric guitar, acoustic guitar, slide guitar, lap steel guitar, mandolin, vocals, producer, mixing, cover photo
- Chris Crew – bass, vocals
- Garry Burnside – bass (tracks: 6, 10)
- Cedric Burnside – drums (tracks: 6, 10)
- Othar Turner – cane fife
- Jim "East Memphis Slim" Dickinson – piano
- Jimmy Crosthwait – washboard
- Richard "Hombre" Price – bass (track 7)
- Gregory Edward Hart – guitar solo (track 2)
- Steve Selvidge – guitar solo (track 2)
- Jimbo Mathus – harmony guitar (track 4), background vocals (track 7)
- Tate County Singers – background vocals
- Stu Cole – background vocals (track 7)
- Greg Humphreys – background vocals (track 7)
- Kevin Houston – recording
- Chris Ludd – mastering
- Chapman Baehler – band photos
- Steve Davis – photography
- Diane Menyuk – graphic design
- Tracy Kane – graphic design
- Larry Brown – liner notes
- Michael Lembo – management
- Lisa Weeks – management
