= Keys to the Kingdom (album) =

Studio album by North Mississippi Allstars
- Released: February 1, 2011
- Genre: Blues rock
- Length: 47:40
- Label: Songs of the South

North Mississippi Allstars chronology
Hernando (2008)	Keys to the Kingdom (2011)	I'm Just Dead I'm Not Gone (2012)

Keys to the Kingdom is the sixth studio album by American band North Mississippi Allstars. It was released in 2011 through Songs of the South Records. It features contributions from Mavis Staples, Alvin Youngblood Hart, Spooner Oldham, Gordie Johnson, Ry Cooder, Jim Spake and Jack Ashford. The album peaked at number 175 on the US Current Album Sales, number 46 on the Top Rock Albums, number two on the Top Blues Albums, number 27 on the Independent Albums, number four on the Heatseekers Albums and number 14 on the Tastemakers.

== Critical reception ==
Professional ratings
Aggregate scores
Source	Rating
Metacritic	68/100
Review scores
Source	Rating
All About Jazz	4/5 stars
AllMusic	4/5 stars
American Songwriter	3.5/5 stars
The Austin Chronicle	2/5 stars
Rolling Stone	3.5/5 stars

Keys to the Kingdom was met with generally favorable reviews from music critics. At Metacritic, which assigns a normalized rating out of 100 to reviews from mainstream publications, the album received an average score of 68, based on six reviews.

Doug Collette of All About Jazz found out that the album "hearkens back to The North Mississippi Allstars earliest and rootsiest records, but nevertheless represents a marked advance in maturity". AllMusic's Thom Jurek wrote that it "may have been recorded in response to death and birth but it is, more than anything else, a celebration of all that Jim Dickinson held dear in life and music, which are, after all, the same thing". Katie Chow of American Songwriter resumed: "Keys to the Kingdom is both a tribute to and a continuation of the Dickinson musical tradition". David Fricke of Rolling Stone wrote: "deep roots, improvising valor and live-Cream brawn come easily to this trio. Catching it all in the studio has been harder, like juggling snakes and feral cats. Singer-guitarist Luther Dickinson, his drumming brother, Cody, and bassist Chris Chew come close".

In a mixed review, Jim Caligiuri of The Austin Chronicle wrote: "more song-oriented than some past Allstars efforts and with an emphasis on country and gospel rather than the trio's gut-bucket blues, it wallops undeniable warmth even when the material itself veers from the Dickinsons' natural strengths".

== Track listing ==
All tracks are written by North Mississippi Allstars, except for track 6 written by Bob Dylan.

No.	Title	Length
1.	"This A'Way"	4:16
2.	"Jumpercable Blues"	3:25
3.	"The Meeting"	4:09
4.	"How I Wish My Train Would Come"	3:52
5.	"Hear the Hills"	6:56
6.	"Stuck Inside of Mobile with the Memphis Blues Again"	3:16
7.	"Let It Roll"	3:23
8.	"Ain't No Grave"	3:47
9.	"Ol' Cannonball"	3:16
10.	"New Orleans Walkin' Dead"	2:31
11.	"Ain't None O' Mine"	4:08
12.	"Jellyrollin' All Over Heaven"	4:41
Total length:		47:40

== Personnel ==
- Cody Dickinson – main performer
- Luther Dickinson – main performer
- Chris Crew – main performer
- Mavis Staples – vocals (track 3)
- Gregory Edward Hart – vocals, harmonica
- Gordie Johnson – guitar (track 2), mixing (tracks: 2, 11)
- Ryland "Ry" Cooder – guitar (track 8)
- Dewey Lindon "Spooner" Oldham – piano
- Jim Spake – saxophone, clarinet
- Jack Ashford – tambourine
- Kevin Houston – recording, mixing
- Ben Tanner – recording
- Jacob Sciba – mixing (tracks: 2, 11)
- Manny A. Sanchez – recording (track 3)
- Martin Pradler – recording (track 8)
- Adam Hill – assistant mixing
- Brad Blackwood – mastering
- Jim Dickinson – liner notes

== Charts ==
Chart performance for Keys to the Kingdom
Chart (2011)	Peak position
US Current Album Sales (Billboard)	175
US Top Rock Albums (Billboard)	46
US Top Blues Albums (Billboard)	2
US Independent Albums (Billboard)	27
US Heatseekers Albums (Billboard)	4
US Indie Store Album Sales (Billboard)	14
