= Polaris (North Mississippi Allstars album) =

Studio album by North Mississippi Allstars
- Released: April 22, 2003
- Studio: Ardent Studios (Memphis, TN); Zebra Ranch Studios (Tate Co., MS)
- Genre: Southern rock; roots rock
- Length: 45:03
- Label: Tone-Cool Records; ATO
- Producer: Cody Dickinson; Luther Dickinson

North Mississippi Allstars chronology
51 Phantom (2001)	Polaris (2003)	Electric Blue Watermelon (2005)

Professional ratings
Review scores
Source	Rating
AllMusic	4/5 stars
The Austin Chronicle	2.5/5 stars
Robert Christgau	(dud)
laut.de	3/5 stars
The Observer	4/5 stars

Polaris is the third studio album by American band North Mississippi Allstars. It was released on April 22, 2003, through Tone-Cool/ATO Records. Recording sessions took place at Ardent Studios in Memphis, Tennessee and at Zebra Ranch Studios in Tate County, Mississippi. The album was produced by Cody and Luther Dickinson.

== Track listing ==
No.	Title	Writer(s)	Length
1.	"Eyes"	James H. Mathis Jr.; North Mississippi Allstars; Carwyn Ellis	4:05
2.	"Meet Me in the City"	David "Junior" Kimbrough	4:07
3.	"Conan"	NMA	4:04
4.	"All Along"	NMA	2:44
5.	"Otay"	NMA	2:57
6.	"Kids These Daze"	James Luther Dickinson; NMA	2:58
7.	"One to Grow On"	NMA	4:44
8.	"Never in All My Days"	NMA	2:52
9.	"Bad Bad Pain"	NMA	2:43
10.	"Polaris"	NMA	3:22
11.	"Time for the Sun to Rise"	Earl King	4:17
12.	"Be So Glad" / "Goin Home"	Ed Lewis; NMA; Cody Burnside (add.)	6:10
Total length:			45:03

== Personnel ==
- Luther Dickinson – vocals, guitar, toy drum kit, producer, mixing
- Cody Dickinson – vocals, guitar, piano, organ, drums, producer, mixing
- Duwayne Burnside – vocals, guitar
- Chris Crew – vocals, bass
- Jimmy Crosthwait – vocals
- Noel Gallagher – vocals
- Otha Turner – vocals
- Reba Russell – vocals
- Susan Marshall – vocals
- Cody Burnside – rap vocals
- Steve Selvidge – vocals, guitar
- Shawn Lane – guitar
- John C. Stubblefield – double bass
- Michael Scott – bassoon
- Carwyn Ellis – electric piano, electric organ
- Jim Dickinson – piano, omnichord, mellotron
- Jim Spake – baritone saxophone
- Tower of Sour – saxophone, trumpet
- Patrick Plunk – clarinet
- Virginia Cupples – French horn
- Robyn Oakes – oboe
- Heather Trussell – violin
- Diden Somel – viola
- B. Gokhan Somel – cello
- Jonathan Kirkscey – cello
- Kevin Houston – recording, mixing
- John Hampton – recording
- John Bailey – recording
- Brad Blackwood – mastering
- Emily Philpott – design
- Danny Clinch – photography

== Charts ==
Chart performance for Polaris
Chart (2003)	Peak position
US Heatseekers Albums (Billboard)	15
