= Possession (Lily Afshar album) =

Studio album by Lily Afshar
- Released: 2002
- Genre: Contemporary classical music
- Length: 62:40
- Label: Archer Records
- Producer: Lily Afshar

Lily Afshar chronology
A Jug of Wine and Thou	Possession	Hemispheres

Possession is the third studio album by classical guitarist Lily Afshar released in 2002 through Archer Records.

== Track list ==
No.	Title	Music	Length
1.	"Scherzo for guitar, Op. 47"	Salvador Brotons
2.	"Omar's Fancy, for guitar"	Dusan Bogdanovic
3.	"Waltz for guitar in D minor, Op. 8/3"	Agustín Barrios-Mangoré
4.	"Un dia de noviembre, for guitar"	Leo Brouwer
5.	"Introduction, Passacaglia and Fugue on "The Golden Flower", for guitar"	Dusan Bogdanovic
6.	"Canción de Cuna on a theme of Grenet, berceuse for guitar"	Leo Brouwer
7.	"Lullabies (3) for guitar"	Barbara Kolb
8.	"Broken Slurs, for guitar"	Barbara Kolb
9.	"Invocación y danza, for guitar ("Homenaje a Manuel de Falla")"	Joaquín Rodrigo
10.	"Ojos Brujos, for guitar"	Leo Brouwer
11.	"Agua e vinho, for guitar"	Egberto Gismonti
12.	"MKG Variations, version for guitar"	Kamran Ince

== Reception ==
The album was reviewed well "...the exciting music and playing, the recording is clean and lively ", "...Ms. Afshar attacks her guitar creating an explosion of sound..."

== Personnel ==
- Lily Afshar - Classical guitar
