= Start with the Soul =

Studio album by Alvin Youngblood Hart
- Released: 2000
- Studio: Sounds Unreel
- Genres: Blues; blues rock
- Length: 46:28
- Label: Hannibal
- Producer: Jim Dickinson

Alvin Youngblood Hart chronology
Territory (1998)	Start with the Soul (2000)	Down in the Alley (2002)

Start with the Soul is an album by the American musician Alvin Youngblood Hart, released in 2000. Hart promoted the album with North American tours that included stints with Galactic and Ben Harper.

== Production ==
The album was recorded at Sounds Unreel, in Memphis, and produced by Jim Dickinson. The more electric sound was inspired in part by the late-sixties San Francisco rock that Hart liked as a kid, as well as Hart's ability to repair older guitars and amplifiers. Start with the Soul includes many covers, which Hart selected because the songs were on albums in his record collection. "Back to Memphis" was composed by Chuck Berry. "Cowboy Boots" is a cover of the Dave Dudley song. "Treat Her Like a Lady" is a version of the Cornelius Brothers & Sister Rose song. "Cryin' Shame" was written and originally recorded by Black Oak Arkansas. "Manos Arriba" deals with police harassment. "Fightin' Hard" laments the early death of a close friend. "Maxwell Street Jimmy" is a tribute to Maxwell Street Jimmy Davis.

== Critical reception ==
Professional ratings
Review scores
Source	Rating
The Penguin Guide to Blues Recordings	2.5/4 stars

The Boston Globe noted that Hart's "flexible, tar-and-whiskey voice conveys as much personality as his fret work". The Province determined that Hart "winds up sounding not terribly unlike a toned-down Little Feat or a little above a run-of-the-mill blues rock power trio." The Scotsman opined that "the instrumentals sound a bit like unfinished backing tracks, but there's a rousing swagger which makes the whole thing hard to resist." The Calgary Herald said that "Start with the Soul doesn't push any boundaries or forge any new musical territory... It merely adds another brick to the already-tired wall of American blues rock."

The Irish Times praised the album's "power, poise and skill". The New York Times considered Start with the Soul to be one of the best albums of 2000, concluding that Hart "has an uncooked voice and a stance all his own... Jim Dickinson's production makes this real living blues." The Commercial Appeal thought it was one of 2000's best albums, labeling it a "classic that confounded all the right people and delighted the rest." The Miami New Times stated that Start with the Soul was the album of the year.

== Track listing ==
No.	Title	Length
1.	"Fightin' Hard"	2:55
2.	"Manos Arriba"	3:31
3.	"Treat Her Like a Lady"	4:01
4.	"Once Again"	2:10
5.	"Porch Monkey's Theme"	4:46
6.	"Electric Eel"	5:14
7.	"Back to Memphis"	3:06
8.	"Cowboy Boots"	3:00
9.	"A Prophet's Mission"	3:53
10.	"Cryin' Shame"	3:26
11.	"The Hustler"	2:07
12.	"Maxwell Street Jimmy"	3:35
13.	"Will I Ever Get Back Home?"	4:44
Total length:		46:28
