= Shannon McNally =

American singer and songwriter (born 1973)

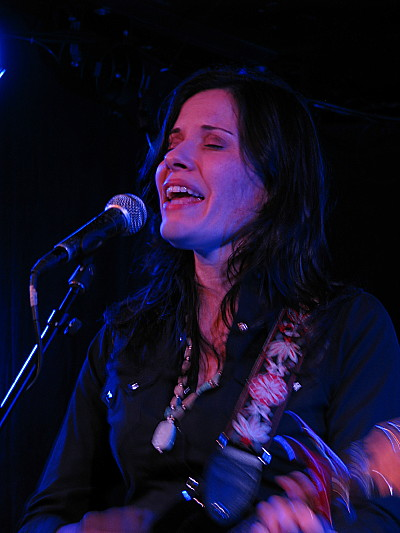
- Shannon McNally at the Saint, Asbury Park, New Jersey, May 18, 2013

Background information
- Born: Shannon Maureen McNally; March 17, 1973 (age 53); Hempstead, New York, U.S.
- Genres: Pop, rock
- Occupations: Singer, songwriter
- Instrument: Guitar
- Labels: Capitol, Back Porch
- Website: www.shannonmcnally.com

Shannon Maureen McNally (born March 17, 1973) is an American singer and songwriter.

== Biography ==
McNally was born in Hempstead, New York, on Long Island. While studying anthropology at Franklin and Marshall College, she began singing and playing guitar in small clubs. In 1997, after graduating and honing her skills on the streets of Paris as a busker, she got a contract with Capitol Records. She recorded her debut album, Jukebox Sparrows (Capitol, 2002), with Jim Keltner, Greg Leisz, and James Gadson. The album was not released at the time of its recording.

In the interim, McNally opened for Stevie Nicks and Ryan Adams and was part of the 1999 Girl's Room tour with Tara MacLean, Kendall Payne, and Amy Correia. She also modeled for Urban Decay cosmetics. In 2000, she issued the EP Bolder Than Paradise.

When Capitol issued Jukebox Sparrows in January 2002, it did so in a market that had already embraced such roots-flavored material such as Ryan Adams and the O Brother, Where Art Thou soundtrack. McNally embarked on a press tour and spent the summer of that year on tour opening for John Mellencamp. In late 2002, she released the Ran on Pure Lightning EP, a collaboration with songwriter Neal Casal.

In 2005, McNally returned with the country, blues, and soul influences on her album Geronimo. The album's June release was accompanied by a summer's worth of live tour dates. In early 2006, she released North American Ghost Music. Tour dates with Son Volt also coincided its release.

McNally took off most of 2008 and 2009 after the birth of her first child. She resumed performing and recording and toured with Dave Alvin & the Guilty Women. In 2009 she released the album Coldwater with her band Hot Sauce.

In 2013, McNally released Small Town Talk, a tribute to the songs of Bobby Charles. In an interview, McNally said that she was a longtime friend of Charles and that her album was inspired by Charles's debut album from 1973. The album is a musical collaboration with the legendary Dr. John.

Shortly after, McNally and her young daughter moved from New Orleans to Holly Springs, Mississippi, where McNally nursed her terminally ill mother until her death in 2015. She took solace in her friendship with Rodney Crowell. Together the two wrote songs and exchanged ideas until her tenth studio album BLACK IRISH was born, which included her song, "Banshee Moan". The album was released in 2017 on Compass Records. Shortly after the release, McNally set out on a nationwide tour with Erin Costelo.

In 2019, McNally joined a new management team and continued to collaborate with Terry Allen as part of his band. She is currently working on her next studio album release to come in 2020.

From 2023-2024 McNally hosted a podcast, The Sacred and the Profane, featuring interviews with blues, country, and other roots artists including Emmylou Harris, Shawn Colvin, Jessi Colter, Benmont Tench, and others.

== Discography ==
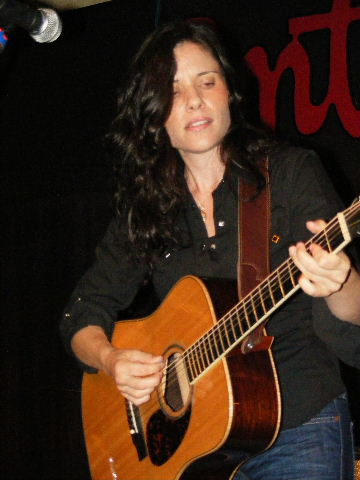
Shannon McNally in Austin, Texas, 2009

Albums

- 2002: Jukebox Sparrows (Capitol)
- 2004: Run for Cover (Tail Feather)
- 2005: Geronimo (Back Porch)
- 2006: North American Ghost Music (Back Porch)
- 2009: Coldwater (self-released)
- 2010: Western Ballad (Sacred Sumac)
- 2013: Small Town Talk (Songs of Bobby Charles) (Sacred Sumac)
- 2017: Black Irish (Compass)
- 2021: The Waylon Sessions (Compass)
- 2023: Live at Dee's (self-released)
- 2025: Live at the 2025 New Orleans Jazz & Heritage Festival (Munck)

EPs

- 2000: Bolder Than Paradise (Capitol)
- 2002: Ran on Pure Lightning (Fargo) with Neal Casal
- 2006: Southside Sessions (Back Porch) with Charlie Sexton
- 2012: Light Walker Demos EP
- 2012: Chasing the Ghost Rehearsal Sessions (Archer) with Amy LaVere
- 2024: Special Edition EP

Singles

- 2017: Merry Christmas Baby (Compass) with Mike Farris

Podcast

- The Sacred and the Profane

=== With Tara MacLean, Kendall Payne, and Amy Correia ===
- 2000: The Girls Room (Capitol, Nettwerk)

=== With Jay Farrar ===
- 2025 Don’t Ya Take It Too Bad (Transmit Sound)

=== Featured In ===
- 2002: various artists- Sweet Home Alabama (Original Motion Picture Soundtrack) (Hollywood) - track 10, "Now That I Know"
- 2002: various artists - Live at the World Cafe: Volume 15 (World Café) - track 13, "Down and Dirty"
- 2002: various artists - 107.1 KGSR Radio Austin - Broadcasts Vol. 10 (KGSR) - track 2-18, "Now That I Know"
- 2003: various artists - Stormy Weather: The Music of Harold Arlen (Sony Classical) - track 2, "As Long as I Live"
- 2013: various artists - Son of Rogues Gallery: Pirate Ballads, Sea Songs & Chanteys (Anti-) - track 16, "Tom's Gone to Hilo" with Gavin Friday
- 2016: various artists- The Musical Mojo of Dr. John: Celebrating Mac and His Music (Concord) - track 10, "Street People"

=== As Guest Musician ===
- 2003: Jason Crosby - Four Chords And Seven Notes Ago (Artists House / Blues Planet)
- 2006: Eric Lindell - Change In The Weather (Alligator)
- 2007: Son Volt - The Search (Transmit Sound / Legacy)
- 2009: Hundred Year Flood - Poison (Frogville)
- 2009: Luther Dickinson and the Sons of Mudboy - Onward And Upward (Memphis International)
- 2013: Jim Lauderdale - Black Roses (Sky Crunch)
- 2014: Rodney Crowell - Tarpaper Sky (New West)
- 2020: The Allman Betts Band - Bless Your Heart - Track 4: Ashes Of My Lovers (BMG Rights Management (US) LLC)
- 2020: Terry Allen And The Panhandle Mystery Band - Just Like Moby Dick (Paradise of Bachelors)
- 2024: Mike Campbell & The Dirty Knobs summer tour

=== As Composer ===
- 2004: Dave Alvin - Ashgrove (Yep Roc) - track 7, "Sinful Daughter" (co-written with Dave Alvin)
- 2015: Papa Mali - Music Is Love (429 Records) - track 8, "Bought and Sold (Body and Soul)" (co-written with Malcolm "Papa Mali" Welbourne)
