= Master of Disaster =

Studio album by John Hiatt
- Released: June 21, 2005
- Studio: Ardent Studio "C", Memphis, Tennessee
- Genre: Heartland rock; roots rock; Americana
- Length: 50:24
- Label: New West
- Producer: Jim Dickinson

John Hiatt chronology
Beneath This Gruff Exterior (2003)	Master of Disaster (2005)	Live from Austin, TX (2005)

Master of Disaster is singer-songwriter John Hiatt's seventeenth album, released in 2005. The album features contributions from the North Mississippi Allstars. The album peaked at number 126 on the Billboard 200 and number 10 on the Independent Albums in the United States.

== Recording and release ==
The recording sessions took place at Ardent Studio "C" in Memphis, Tennessee. The album was produced by Jim Dickinson. It features contributions from the North Mississippi Allstars, David Hood, Jim Spake, Jeff Callaway, Scott Thompson, Joe Sellmansberger, "T-Bone" Tommy Burroughs, and Dickinson.

Master of Disaster was released by New West on June 21, 2005. The album debuted, and peaked at No. 126 on the Billboard 200 chart.

== Critic reception ==
The album was met with generally favorable reviews from music critics. At Metacritic, which assigns a normalized rating out of 100 to reviews from mainstream publications, the album received an average score of 70, based on eight reviews.

Professional ratings
Aggregate scores
Source	Rating
Metacritic	70/100
Review scores
Source	Rating
AllMusic	3.5/5 stars
The Irish Times	5/5 stars
The New Zealand Herald	4/4 stars
Now	3/5
PopMatters	4/10
Under The Radar	7/10 stars

AllMusic's Mark Deming wrote "while Hiatt sounds soulful as all get out (as per usual) on this set, the lingering mood is often downbeat and introspective," adding "Master of Disaster packs too much good and greasy East Memphis vibe to qualify as "mellow," even when Hiatt is searching the depths of his soul, and his material strikes a comfortable balance between his more confessional work and his impulsive rock & roll, allowing him to have it both ways for a change." Steve Horowitz of PopMatters says that "the tunes would be a whole lot better with careful pruning".

== Track listing ==
All tracks are written by John Hiatt.

No.	Title	Length
1.	"Master of Disaster"	5:26
2.	"Howlin' Down the Cumberland"	3:45
3.	"Thunderbird"	4:04
4.	"Wintertime Blues"	4:19
5.	"When My Love Crosses Over"	4:21
6.	"Love's Not Where We Thought We Left It"	5:17
7.	"Ain't Ever Goin' Back"	5:40
8.	"Cold River"	5:34
9.	"Find You at Last"	4:48
10.	"Old School"	3:18
11.	"Back on the Corner"	3:52
Total length:		50:24

== Personnel ==
- John Hiatt – songwriter, vocals, guitar
- Luther Dickinson – guitar
- David Hood – bass guitar
- Cody Dickinson – drums
- Jim "East Memphis Slim" Dickinson – keyboards, producer
- Jim Spake – saxophone
- Jeff Callaway – trombone
- Scott Thompson – trumpet
- Joe Sellmansberger – tuba
- Thomas "T-Bone Tommy" Burroughs – violin
- John Hampton – recording and mixing
- Doug Sax – mastering
- Robert Hadley – mastering
- Erik Von Weber – photography
- Mark Lipson – photography

== Charts ==
Chart performance for Master of Disaster
Chart (2005)	Peak position
US Billboard 200	126
US Independent Albums (Billboard)	10
