= Spencer Dickinson =

Spencer Dickinson may refer to:

- Spencer Dickinson (music project), blues project made of Jon Spencer and Luther Dickinson active in the early 2000s (decade)
- Spencer Dickinson (politician) (born 1943), American legislator from the state of Rhode Island
