= Stranger Me =

Studio album by Amy LaVere
- Released: July 19, 2011
- Label: Archer
- Producers: Craig Silvey; Ward Archer

Amy LaVere chronology
Anchors and Anvils (2007)	Stranger Me (2011)	Runaway's Diary (2014)

Professional ratings
Aggregate scores
Source	Rating
AnyDecentMusic?	7.2/10
Metacritic	78/100
Review scores
Source	Rating
AllMusic	4/5 stars
Blurt	8/10
Consequence of Sound	B
Paste	8.9/10
PopMatters	8/10

Stranger Me is the third studio album by American musician Amy LaVere. It was released in July 4, 2011 by Archer Records.

== Production ==
Stranger Me was recorded and mixed at Music + Arts Studio in Memphis, Tennessee and at The Garden Studio in London, England, with producer Craig Silvey.

== Critical reception ==
Stranger Me was met with "generally favorable" reviews from critics. At Metacritic, which assigns a weighted average rating out of 100 to reviews from mainstream publications, this release received an average score of 78 based on 9 reviews. At AnyDecentMusic?, the release was given a 7.2 out of 10 based on a critical consensus of 7 reviews.

In a review for AllMusic, critic reviewer Hal Horowitz wrote "Stranger Me is not only a logical title but a demanding and surprisingly successful experiment that challenges both LaVere and the listener, pushing her into edgy, clearly non-commercial areas." Steve Pick of Blurt wrote "LaVere's vocals are deceptively lightweight. Her voice is high and thin, but she phrases eloquently and conveys a wide range of emotional conviction throughout all her work." At Paste, Stephen Deusner said LaVere's release is a "well-rounded album."

== Track listing ==
Stranger Me track listing
No.	Title	Writer(s)	Length
1.	"Damn Love Song"	Amy LaVere; David Brookings	5:12
2.	"You Can't Keep Me"	Amy LaVere	3:07
3.	"Red Banks"	Kristi Witt	3:29
4.	"A Great Divide"	Amy LaVere; Steve Selvidge	3:11
5.	"Often Happens"	Amy LaVere	3:37
6.	"Lucky Boy"	Jimbo Mathus	3:38
7.	"Tricky Heart"	Amy LaVere	4:45
8.	"Stranger Me"	Amy LaVere	4:45
9.	"Candle Mambo"	Captain Beefheart	4:07
10.	"Cry My Eyes Out"	Amy LaVere	4:37
11.	"Let Yourself Go (Come On)"	Bobby Charles	4:55

== Personnel ==
Musicians

- Amy LaVere − vocals, bass
- Jonathan Kirkscey − cello
- David Cousar − guitar
- Clint Maedgen − flute
- Jim Spake − sax
- Rick Steff − accordion, piano, vibrachime
- Nahshon Benford − trumpet
- Beth Luscombe − viola
- Bobby Furgo − violin
- David Brookings − vocals
- Jimbo Mathus − vocals
- Patrick McKinney − vocals
- Steve Selvidge − vocals
- Captain Beefheart − vocals
- Bobby Charles − vocals

Production

- Craig Silvey − producer, engineer, mixing
- Ward Archer − producer
- George Marino − mastering
