= Everybody Hollerin' Goat =

Studio album by Othar Turner
- Released: 1998
- Genre: Hill country blues, fife and drum blues
- Label: Birdman
- Producer: Luther Dickinson

Othar Turner chronology
Mississippi Blues in Memphis Vol. 1 (1993)	Everybody Hollerin' Goat (1998)	From Senegal to Senatobia (1999)

Everybody Hollerin' Goat is an album by the American musician Othar Turner, released in 1998. He is credited with the Rising Star Fife and Drum Band. Turner was 90 when he recorded the album. The title refers to Turner's barbecued goat parties.

== Production ==
Recorded mostly on Turner's north Mississippi farm, the album was produced by Luther Dickinson. R.L. Boyce, Turner's nephew, contributed to the album. The sessions took place between 1992 and 1997. It was Dickinson's intention to simply make a document of Turner's music for Turner and his family. Dickinson first noticed Turner when the fife player appeared on a 1970s episode of Mister Rogers' Neighborhood. Dickinson sampled Everybody Hollerin' Goat on his North Mississippi Allstars album Shake Hands with Shorty.

== Critical reception ==
Professional ratings
Review scores
Source	Rating
AllMusic	4/5 stars
The Encyclopedia of Popular Music	3/5 stars
The Penguin Guide to Blues Recordings	4/4 stars

Rolling Stone wrote that the band rocks "like a nineteenth-century P-Funk, making exhilarating rhythm poetry out of rudimentary tools and ancient, buoyant soul"; the magazine, in 1999, deemed Everybody Hollerin' Goat one of the best blues albums of the 1990s. Chris Morris listed Everybody Hollerin' Goat as the second best album of 1998.

AllMusic called the album "a collection of haunting, authentic Mississippi-born fife and drum blues."

== Track listing ==
No.	Title	Length
1.	"Shimmy She Wobble"
2.	"Bounceball"
3.	"Short'nin' / Henduck"
4.	"Too Slow"
5.	"Shimmy She Wobble"
6.	"Station Blues"
7.	"Shake 'Em"
8.	"My Babe"
9.	"Boogie"
10.	"How Many Mo' Years?"
11.	"Roll and Tumble"
12.	"2-Stepping Place"
13.	"Granny, Do Your Dog Bite?"
14.	"Shimmy She Wobble"
15.	"Glory, Glory, Hallelujah!"
