= Mud Boy and the Neutrons =

American rock music band

Mud Boy and the Neutrons was a Memphis rock music band who influenced the Memphis alternative rock scene from the 1970s to the 1990s.

They released three albums on labels like New Rose Records (France) and Koch International. The group featured Jim Dickinson on keyboards, vocals and guitar, Sid Selvidge on acoustic guitar and vocals, Lee Baker on electric guitar, and Jimmy Crosthwait on washboard. Baker, who made a guest appearance on Big Star's Third/Sister Lovers album and led his own Lee Baker & The Agitators group, died on September 10, 1996. At that time Mud Boy and the Neutrons temporarily disbanded, but reformed in 2005 to perform at a festival of Memphis music held at The Barbican in London. This concert was filmed but to date remains unreleased.

The group has always been known for deliberately making their offbeat public performances rare, special events; they never toured. Their music style included elements of varying Southern United States-oriented music styles including blues, "swamp" music, R&B, folk music, gospel music, and country.

Tav Falco's Panther Burns and others from the area were inspired by the band. Two sons of Dickinson (Luther and Cody), influenced by the group, formed the North Mississippi Allstars with other musicians in the 1990s; Selvidge's son Steve founded a group called Big Ass Truck in the same period.

Dickinson died on August 15, 2009. Sid Selvidge died from cancer on May 2, 2013, at the age of 69 (he was born July 21, 1943).

== Discography ==
- Known Felons in Drag (1986)
- Negro Streets at Dawn (1993)
- They Walk Among Us (1995)

Compilations

- Play New Rose For Me (1987)
- It Came From Memphis, Volume 1 (1995)
- It Came From Memphis, Volume 2 (2001)
- On Air: Live Music From The WEVL Archives (1996)
