= Virtuoso Guitar =

Virtuoso Guitar may refer to:

- Virtuoso Guitar (Lily Afshar album), a 2008 video album
- Virtuoso Guitar (Laurindo Almeida album), 1977
