= Hemisphere =

Hemisphere may refer to:

== In geometry ==
- Hemisphere (geometry), a half of a sphere

== As half of Earth or any spherical astronomical object ==
- A hemisphere of Earth
  - Northern Hemisphere
  - Southern Hemisphere
  - Eastern Hemisphere
  - Western Hemisphere
  - Land and water hemispheres
- A half of the (geocentric) celestial sphere
  - Northern celestial hemisphere
  - Southern celestial hemisphere
- A cultural hemisphere
- The near or far side of the Moon

== As half of the brain ==
- A cerebral hemisphere, a division of the cerebrum
- A half of the cerebellum, a smaller part of the brain

== Other ==
- Hémisphère, a 12-inch album by French artists Paradis
- Hemispheres (magazine), an inflight publication
- Hemispheres (TV program), Canadian and Australian news program
- Hemispheres (Rush album), 1978
- Hemispheres (Lily Afshar album), 2006
- Hemispheres (Doseone album), 1998
- L'Hemisfèric at the Ciutat de les Arts i les Ciències, Valencia, Spain
- Hemisphere Project, a counternarcotics program between United States federal and state drug officials and AT&T
