= Territory (Alvin Youngblood Hart album) =

Studio album by Alvin Youngblood Hart
- Released: 1998
- Genre: Blues
- Label: Hannibal/Rykodisc
- Producers: Michael Nash, Carey Williams

Alvin Youngblood Hart chronology
Big Mama's Door (1996)	Territory (1998)	Start with the Soul (2000)

Territory is the second album by the American musician Alvin Youngblood Hart, released in 1998. It was his first album for a Rykodisc label. Hart supported the album with a British tour, as well as an appearance at the Edmonton Folk Music Festival.

== Production ==
"Ice Rose" is a cover of the Captain Beefheart song. "Illinois Blues" was written by Skip James. "John Hardy" is a version of the traditional folk song. Hart's cover of "Dancing with Tears in My Eyes" was inspired by X's interpretation of the song. "Countrycide" references an 1886 lynching in Carroll County, Mississippi. Hart played acoustic guitar, electric guitar, six-strings, concertina, lap steel, 12-strings, dobro, and mandolin.

== Critical reception ==
Professional ratings
Review scores
Source	Rating
AllMusic	3/5 stars
Birmingham Post	4/5 stars
Calgary Herald	4/5 stars
Robert Christgau	A−
Edmonton Journal	4/5 stars
The Penguin Guide to Blues Recordings	3/4 stars
Vancouver Sun	3.5/5 stars

The Observer called Hart "the best of the new crop of acoustic bluesmen." The Chicago Tribune noted that "Hart's distinctive voice and rocking spirit draw a straight line through everything"; the paper chose the album as the second best blues album of 1998. The Calgary Herald wrote that "Hart stretches stylistically ... while impressively staying true to his acoustic blues heart." The Birmingham Post deemed Hart "a wonderfully inventive player happily mining away at odd, forgotten seams in the vast motherlode of American music."

The Washington Post opined: "Playing a variety of acoustic and electric instruments, he brings surprising color and texture to an improbable but thoroughly enjoyable collection." Newsday concluded that "all this variety might be pointless showing-off were it not for his consistently inventive guitar and compelling vocals, which seem to carry urgent messages from a long-lost past." JazzTimes determined that "Hart’s obvious command of Piedmont and Delta styles is beautifully balanced by a sincere and soulful expression."

== Track listing ==
No.	Title	Length
1.	"Tallacatcha"
2.	"Illinois Blues"
3.	"Ouachita Run"
4.	"Sallie, Queen of the Pines"
5.	"Countrycide"
6.	"Ice Rose"
7.	"Dancing with Tears in My Eyes"
8.	"Mama Don't Allow"
9.	"John Hardy"
10.	"Just About to Go"
11.	"Underway at Seven"
