= Set Sail (North Mississippi Allstars album) =

Studio album by North Mississippi Allstars
- Released: January 28, 2022
- Studios: Applehead Recording Studios (Woodstock, New York); Wilbe Studios (Atlanta, Georgia); Royal Studios (Memphis, Tennessee)
- Genres: Retro-soul; electric blues; funk; roots rock; neo-psychedelia; americana
- Length: 44:17
- Label: New West
- Producers: Cody Dickinson; Luther Dickinson; William Bell

North Mississippi Allstars chronology
Up and Rolling (2019)	Set Sail (2022)	Still Shakin' (2025)

Set Sail is the thirteenth studio album by American band North Mississippi Allstars. It was released on January 28, 2022, through New West Records, making it their second album for the label. Recording sessions took place at Applehead Recording Studios in Woodstock, New York, at Wilbe Studios in Atlanta, and at Royal Studios in Memphis, Tennessee. Production was handled entirely by Cody and Luther Dickinson, except for one song, "Never Want To Be Kissed" produced with William Bell. It features contributions from William Bell, John Medeski, Wizard Jones, Phyllislorena Smiley, Lucia and Isla Belle Dickinson. The album peaked at No. 51 on the Top Current Album Sales and No. 1 on the Top Blues Albums in the United States.

At the 65th Annual Grammy Awards, Set Sail was nominated for a Grammy Award for Best Contemporary Blues Album, but lost to Edgar Winter's Brother Johnny.

== Critical reception ==
Professional ratings
Aggregate scores
Source	Rating
Metacritic	78/100
Review scores
Source	Rating
AllMusic	4/5 stars
laut.de	3/5 stars
Mojo	3/5 stars
PopMatters	8/10
Record Collector	4/5 stars
Spectrum Culture	3.75/5 stars
Uncut	8/10

Set Sail was met with universal acclaim from music critics. At Metacritic, which assigns a normalized rating out of 100 to reviews from mainstream publications, the album received an average score of 78, based on six reviews.

AllMusic's Thom Jurek called it "easily the band's most mature, far-reaching, affirmative statement. Making it even more indispensable is that it is as infectiously danceable as it is life affirming". Rich Wilhelm of PopMatters wrote: "more than two decades since their debut, North Mississippi Allstars – who currently include the Dickinson brothers along with bassist Jesse Williams and vocalists Lamar Williams Jr. and Sharisse Norman — are still creating memorable music but from a decidedly more mellow state of mind. That's evident from the first notes of the opening title track from their new album Set Sail". Bud Scoppa of Uncut stated: "bloodlines and geography figure into every NMAs album, but on Set Sail, Luther and Cody Dickinson make family and setting the conjoined theme". In a mixed review, Andy Fyfe of Mojo wrote: "apart from the upbeat soul of "Never Want To Be Kissed", featuring Stax veteran William Bell on vocals, Set Sail stumbles and squints through its nine other tracks, although on "Bumpin'" they at least rouse themselves long enough to sound like Tony Joe White imitating Sly Stone".

== Track listing ==
No.	Title	Writer(s)	Length
1.	"Set Sail, Pt. 1"	North Mississippi Allstars	4:57
2.	"Bumpin'"	Luther Dickinson; Daniel Tashian	2:52
3.	"See the Moon"	NMA	3:21
4.	"Outside"	NMA	4:58
5.	"Didn't We Have a Time"	NMA	6:04
6.	"Never Want to Be Kissed" (featuring William Bell)	NMA; William Bell	3:42
7.	"Set Sail, Pt. 2"	NMA	4:33
8.	"Juicy Juice"	NMA	3:32
9.	"Rabbit Foot"	NMA	4:04
10.	"Authentic"	NMA	6:14
Total length:			44:17

== Personnel ==
- Cody Dickinson – drums, bass & guitar (track 3), synth (tracks: 3, 6), vocals, producer, mixing, art direction
- Luther Dickinson – guitar, synth (tracks: 2, 5), Farfisa (tracks: 8, 9), vocals, producer, art direction
- Jesse Williams – bass, vocals
- Lamar Williams, Jr. – vocals
- Sharisse Norman – vocals
- William Bell – vocals & producer (track 6)
- John Medeski – Wurlitzer (track 4), piano & Hammond B3 (track 10)
- Wizard Jones – clavichord (track 3), recording (track 6)
- Phyllislorena Smiley – background vocals (track 6)
- Lucia Dickinson – background vocals (tracks: 5, 10)
- Isla Belle Dickinson – background vocals (tracks: 5, 10)
- Marc Franklin – horns and strings arranger, trumpet
- Art Edmaiston – tenor saxophone
- Jim Spake – baritone saxophone
- Jessie Munson – violin
- Wenyih Yu – violin
- Yennifer Correia – violin
- Jennifer Puckett – viola
- Mark Wallace – cello
- Chris Bittner – recording (tracks: 4, 10)
- Paul Taylor – editing (track 6)
- Justin Perkins – mastering
- Boo Mitchell – recording
- Walter Anderson – artwork
- Matt Etgen – layout

== Charts ==
Chart performance for Set Sail
Chart (2022)	Peak position
US Top Current Album Sales (Billboard)	51
US Top Blues Albums (Billboard)	1
