= Virtuoso Guitar (Lily Afshar album) =

Video by Lily Afshar
- Released: 22 August 2008
- Genre: contemporary classical guitar
- Label: Mel Bay

Lily Afshar chronology
Hemispheres	Virtuoso Guitar

Virtuoso Guitar is a DVD by Lily Afshar released through Mel Bay on 22 August 2008.

== Track listing ==
No.	Title	Music	Length
1.	"24 Caprichos de Goya, Op. 195"	Mario Castelnuovo-Tedesco
2.	"Andaluza (Spanish Dance #5)"	Enrique Granados, Arrangement by Lily Afshar
3.	"Five Popular Persian Ballads"	Arranged by Lily Afshar
4.	"Gozaar (Calligraphy No. 5)"	Reza Vali
5.	"Kara Toprak"	Asik Veysel, Arranged by Ricardo Moyano
6.	"Koyunbaba, Op. 19"	Carlo Domeniconi
7.	"Misionera"	Fernando Bustamante
8.	"Un Dia de Noviembre"	Leo Brouwer

== Reception ==
The album received well: "...by all standards, a remarkable performance "

== Personnel ==
Lily Afshar - Classical guitar
