= Live from Austin, TX (John Hiatt album) =

Live album by John Hiatt
- Released: November 1, 2005
- Recorded: December 14, 1993
- Genre: Rock
- Length: 73:48
- Label: New West

John Hiatt chronology
Master of Disaster (2005)	Live from Austin, TX (2005)	Same Old Man (2008)

Live from Austin, TX is singer-songwriter John Hiatt's second live album, released in 2005. It was recorded for the PBS show Austin City Limits in 1993 on the tour supporting Perfectly Good Guitar. A DVD from the show was also released on the same date.

Professional ratings
Review scores
Source	Rating
AllMusic	3.5/5 stars

== Track listing ==
All tracks are written by John Hiatt, except where noted.

No.	Title	Writer(s)	Length
1.	"Icy Blue Heart"		4:16
2.	"Love in a Hurricane"		4:06
3.	"When You Hold Me Tight"		5:55
4.	"Your Dad Did"		6:05
5.	"Straight Outta Time"		6:17
6.	"Memphis in the Meantime"		4:31
7.	"Something Wild"		6:58
8.	"Have a Little Faith in Me"		4:13
9.	"Buffalo River Home"		5:37
10.	"Thing Called Love"		6:10
11.	"Angel"		3:35
12.	"Tennessee Plates"	John Hiatt, Mike Porter	3:58
13.	"Slow Turning"		6:18
14.	"Perfectly Good Guitar"		5:49
Total length:			73:48

1. "Icy Blue Heart" – 4:16
2. "Love in a Hurricane" – 4:06
3. "When You Hold Me Tight" – 5:55
4. "Your Dad Did – 6:05
5. "Straight Outta Time" – 6:17
6. "Memphis in the Meantime" – 4:31
7. "Something Wild" – 6:58
8. "Have a Little Faith in Me" – 4:13
9. "Buffalo River Home" – 5:37
10. "Thing Called Love" – 6:10
11. "Angel" – 3:35
12. "Tennessee Plates" – 3:58 (Hiatt, Mike Porter)
13. "Slow Turning" – 6:18
14. "Perfectly Good Guitar" – 5:49

== Personnel ==
- John Hiatt – guitar, vocals
- Michael Ward – guitar
- Michael Urbano – drums
- Davey Faragher – bass guitar
