= The Musical Mojo of Dr. John: Celebrating Mac and His Music =

Compilation album by Various artists
- Released: October 21, 2016
- Label: Concord

The Musical Mojo of Dr. John: Celebrating Mac and His Music is a compilation album by various artists organized to celebrate the career of New Orleans musical legend Dr. John. It was produced by Don Was, who assembled the featured artists at New Orleans' Saenger Theatre on May 3, 2014. Concord Records released a two-disc CD, and a live-concert film, on October 21, 2016.

== Track listing ==
1. Dr. John and Bruce Springsteen – "Right Place, Wrong Time"
2. Jason Isbell – "Blow Wind Blow"
3. Cyril Neville – "Indian Red"
4. Bill Kreutzmann and Anders Osborne – "Somebody Changed The Lock"
5. Dr. John, Aaron Neville and Charles Neville – "Please Send Me Someone To Love"
6. George Porter Jr. and Zigaboo Modeliste – "Junco Partner"
7. Irma Thomas – "Since I Fell for You"
8. Tab Benoit – "Stack-A-Lee"
9. Allen Toussaint – "Life"
10. Shannon McNally – "Street People"
11. Dave Malone – "Goodnight, Irene"
12. Monk Boudreaux – "Big Chief"
13. Widespread Panic and The Dirty Dozen Brass Band – "Familiar Reality"
14. Warren Haynes – "You Lie"
15. Chuck Leavell – "Traveling Mood"
16. Ryan Bingham – "Back By The River"
17. John Boutté – "Let’s Make A Better World"
18. Mavis Staples – "Lay My Burden Down"
19. John Fogerty – "New Orleans"
20. Dr. John and Terence Blanchard – "Come Rain Or Come Shine"
21. Dr. John and Sarah Morrow – "I Walk On Guilded Splinters"
22. Dr. John and Sarah Morrow – "Such a Night"

== Personnel ==
- Guitar: Brint Anderson, Brian Stoltz
- Bass: Don Was
- Drums: Kenny Aronoff, Doug Belote
- Keyboards: John Gros
- Saxophone: Khris Royal
- Trumpet: Bobby Campo
- Trombone: Mark Mullins
- Background Vocals: Alfreda McCrary, Ann McCrary, Regina McCrary

== Reception ==
Hal Horowitz of American Songwriter gave the album a rating of 4.5 out of 5 stars.
