= Jukebox Sparrows =

Studio album by Shannon McNally
- Released: January 8, 2002
- Genre: Alternative rock
- Length: 60:23
- Label: Capitol
- Producer: Ron Aniello

Shannon McNally chronology
Bolder Than Paradise (2000)	Jukebox Sparrows (2002)	Ran on Pure Lightning (2002)

Professional ratings
Review scores
Source	Rating
AllMusic	4/5 stars
Rolling Stone	link

Jukebox Sparrows is the first full-length album by American singer-songwriter Shannon McNally, released in 2002 (see 2002 in music).

== Critical reception ==
Stephen Thomas Erlewine of AllMusic concludes his review by saying, "This is very much a debut -- at times it's hard to not wish it would soar a little higher or shake off the formula of its genre -- but it's a very enjoyable, promising debut from an artist who could turn into something special."

Eden Miller of PopMatters writes, "Even though Jukebox Sparrows makes a couple mistakes along the way, it is an impressive debut that clearly shows the abilities of this powerful singer and songwriter."

Billboard writes, "Produced by Ron Aniello over 11 months at Cello Studios in Los Angeles, "Jukebox Sparrows" reveals itself as a surprisingly confident musical and lyrical offering for such a young songwriter."

The Washington Post's Mark Jenkins writes, "the singer has a taste for country, blues and gospel that would seem incongruous if she didn't boast the sort of voice that could stir a Pentecostal congregation."

== Track listing ==
No.	Title	Writer(s)	Length
1.	"Down and Dirty"	Shannon McNally	4:53
2.	"I'll Always Be Around"	McNally; Kevin Hunter	5:19
3.	"Bitter Blue"	McNally; Ron Aniello; Joshua Grange	4:45
4.	"Now That I Know"	McNally; Eric Bazilian	4:45
5.	"(It Ain't Easy Being) Green"	McNally; Robbie Nevil	3:58
6.	"It Could've Been Me"	McNally	4:49
7.	"Colorado"	McNally; Barry Reynolds; Grange	6:33
8.	"Bolder Than Paradise"	McNally; Brock Walsh	4:29
9.	"Start All Over"	McNally; Hunter; Grange	4:47
10.	"Bury My Heart on the Jersey Shore"	McNally; Richard Feldman; Grange	11:08
11.	"Jukebox Sparrows"	McNally	4:57
Total length:			60:23

== Personnel ==
- Shannon McNally – vocals, background vocals
- Maxi Anderson – background vocals
- Ron Aniello – organ, guitar, percussion, electric guitar, mellotron, Farfisa organ, Wurlitzer, toy piano
- Joshua Grange – guitars
- Alex Brown – background vocals
- Paul Bushnell – bass guitar
- Lenny Castro – percussion
- Matt Chamberlain – drums
- Mike Elizondo – bass guitar
- Aaron Embry – organ, piano, keyboards
- James Gadson – drums
- Bob Glaub – bass guitar
- Bill Hayes – percussion
- Rami Jaffee – keyboards
- Jim Keltner – percussion, drums
- Greg Kurstin – organ, synthesizer, piano, Wurlitzer
- John Leftwich – bass guitar
- Greg Leisz – pedal steel, electric guitar, steel guitar, lap steel guitar
- Brian McCloud – drums
- Bill Payne – organ, piano, Wurlitzer
- Walter Rodriguez – percussion
- Matt Rollings – organ, piano
- Benmont Tench – organ
- Waddy Wachtel – guitar
- Patrick Warren – keyboards
- David Woodford – baritone saxophone

== Production ==
- Producer: Ron Aniello
- Engineers: Ron Aniello, Neal Avron, Mark Howard, Bob Kearney, Eric Sarafin, Howard Willing
- Assistant engineers: Paul Hayden, Billy Kinsley, Mike Scotella
- Mixing: Neal Avron, Mark Howard, Jim Scott, Mike Shipley
- Mastering: Joe Gastwirt, Ted Jensen
- A&R: Watts Russell
- Production coordination: Shari Sutcliffe
- String samples: Steve Porcaro
- Art Direction: Len Peltier
- Design: Len Peltier
- Artwork: Shannon McNally
