= Same Old Man =

Studio album by John Hiatt
- Released: May 27, 2008
- Studios: Highway 61; Tanning and Barbecue
- Genre: Rock
- Length: 45:40
- Label: New West
- Producer: John Hiatt

John Hiatt chronology
Live from Austin, TX (2005)	Same Old Man (2008)	The Open Road (2010)

Singles from Same Old Man
- 1. "Old Days" Released: 2008

Same Old Man is singer-songwriter John Hiatt's eighteenth album, released in 2008. The album peaked at number 84 on the Billboard 200.

== Release ==
Same Old Man was released by New West on May 27, 2008. It debuted, and peaked at No. 84 on the Billboard 200 chart. "Old Days" was released as a single.

== Critical reception ==
Professional ratings
Aggregate scores
Source	Rating
Metacritic	77/100
Review scores
Source	Rating
AllMusic	4/5 stars
Robert Christgau	(choice cut)
The Irish Times	4/5 stars
Now	3/5

The album was met with generally favorable reviews from music critics. At Metacritic, which assigns a normalized rating out of 100 to reviews from mainstream publications, the album received an average score of 77, based on nine reviews.

AllMusic's Mark Deming writes, "Hiatt sings about the nuts and bolts of human relationships with the emotional gravity of someone who has learned plenty over the course of 56 years, and he writes and sings with the conviction of a true believer. More than a quarter century after breaking through as an "Angry Young Man," John Hiatt is neither these days, but Same Old Man shows he's learned a lot since then, and you can hear the lessons shining through in this music." The Washington Post noted that a "wry sense of humor paired with his deadpan, gruff delivery is Hiatt's secret weapon." Joe Breen of The Irish Times writes that the album "kicks off with the kind of loose-limbed, colour-rich biographical sketch of old bluesmen that tells you everything about them and him: wry, respectful and full of the kind of Americana spirit that makes Hiatt's albums a must for any self-respecting music fan." Doug Collette of Glide Magazine says, "Same Old Man may be the most accessible album of John Hiatt’s career. But it’s worth serious note that the rewards of hearing this album far outweigh its simplicity and that’s due to the strength of the songs."

== Track listing ==
All tracks are written by John Hiatt.

1. "Old Days". 4:05
2. "Love You Again". 4:14
3. "On with You". 3:54
4. "Hurt My Baby". 4:35
5. "What Love Can Do". 4:14
6. "Ride My Pony". 3:41
7. "Cherry Red". 4:11
8. "Our Time". 4:10
9. "Two Hearts". 4:20
10. "Same Old Man". 4:05
11. "Let’s Give This Love a Try". 4:11

== Personnel ==
- John Hiatt - Acoustic and electric guitar, vocals, six string bass, harmonium
- Luther Dickinson - Acoustic and electric guitar, mandolin, National Resonator
- Kenneth Blevins - Drums
- Patrick O'Hearn - Bass
- Lilly Hiatt - Vocals on ("Love You Again" written by Roger Coots) and "What Love Can Do"

== Single ==
"Old Days" (2008)

- "Old Days" (4:02)
- "Love You Again" (4:13)
- "Cherry Red" (4:09)
