= Lily Afshar =

Iranian-American classical guitarist (1960–2023)

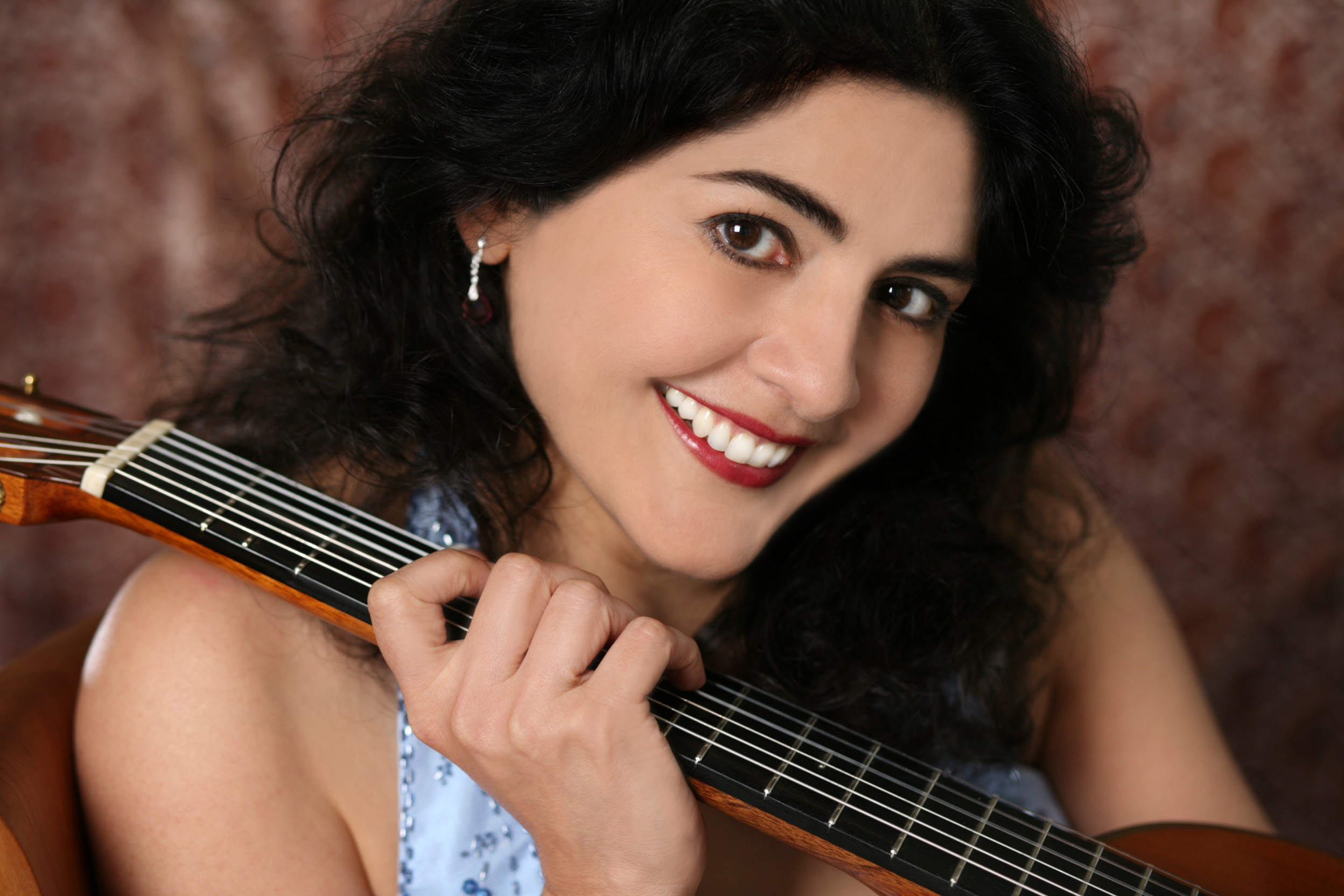

Background information
- Born: 9 March 1960; Tehran, Iran
- Died: 24 October 2023 (aged 63) Tonekabon, Mazandaran, Iran
- Genre: Contemporary classical
- Occupations: Musician; professor
- Instrument: Classical guitar
- Labels: Summit; Archer; Mel Bay

Lily Afshar (Persian: لیلی افشار; 9 March 1960 – 24 October 2023) was an Iranian-American classical guitarist.

== Life and career ==
Afshar moved to the United States in 1977, to study at the Boston Conservatory of Music, where she received a bachelor's and a master's degree in guitar. In 1989, she received a doctorate from the Florida State University with a thesis on 24 Caprichos de Goya by Mario Castelnuovo-Tedesco; in 1994 she was the first musician to record Castelnuovo-Tedesco's guitar composition. She was also the first woman in the world to get a doctorate in classical guitar.

In 1989, Afshar joined the faculty of the University of Memphis as head of its classical guitar program. She remained at the university until her retirement in 2023, completing 34 years on the faculty.

Afshar won the 2000 Orville H. Gibson Award for Best Female Classical Guitarist, as well as three annual "Premier Guitarist" awards by the Memphis Chapter of the National Academy of Recording Arts & Sciences. Afshar was awarded the 2008 Distinguished Teaching Award, the 2000 Eminent Faculty Award, and the 1996 Distinguished Research Award at The University of Memphis. Afshar was chosen as "Artistic Ambassador" for the United States Information Agency to Africa, and was among twelve guitarists selected to play for Andrés Segovia in his master classes held at the University of Southern California.

About her style, the magazine Global Rhythm wrote that she combined "the delicate yet powerful sound of the classical guitar with the melodic ornamentation of Persian and Baroque music". While reviewing one concert of hers, the Washington Post critic Joan Reinthaler noted that "Afshar has the delicate touch and the keen concentration that characterize the best guitarists, and she also has the musical sense and restraint that characterize only a few".

Afshar died of cancer in Tonekabon, Mazandaran, Iran, on 24 October 2023, at the age of 63.

== Discography, books, and DVDs ==
- Caprichos de Goya, Op. 195 – CD, Summit Records (1994)
- A Jug of Wine and Thou – CD, Summit Records (1999)
- Possession – CD, Archer Records (2002)
- Hemispheres – CD, Archer Records (2006)
- Virtuoso Guitar – DVD, Mel Bay (2008)
- One Thousand and One Nights – CD, Kargah-e Musiqi (2013)
- Musica da Camera – CD, Archer Records (2013)
- Bach on Fire- CD, Archer Records (2014)
- Classical Guitar Secrets Vol. 1 – DVD, Guitar Control (2011)
- Classical Guitar Secrets Vol. 2 – DVD, Guitar Control (2011)
- Five Popular Persian Ballads – Mel Bay (2000)
- Essential Bach for Guitar Arranged by Lily Afshar – Mel Bay (2012)
- Classical Guitar Collection Vol. 1 – DVD, Guitar Control (2016)
- Classical Guitar Collection Vol. 2 – DVD, Guitar Control (2016)
- Scarlatti and Weiss for Guitar – arranged for guitar by Lily Afshar, Mel Bay (2016)
- Spanish Composers for Classical Guitar – arranged for guitar by Lily Afshar, Mel Bay (2016)
- Valses Poeticos by Enrique Granados – arranged for guitar by Lily Afshar, Mel Bay (2016)

== See also ==
- Music of Iran
- List of Iranian musicians
- List of famous Iranian women
