= Spencer Dickinson (music project) =

American blues music project

- Label: Toy's Factory
- Past members: Jon Spencer and Luther Dickinson

Spencer Dickinson was a blues project made up of Jon Spencer of Blues Explosion and Luther Dickinson of the North Mississippi Allstars. They released two albums:

- Spencer Dickinson CD (Toy's Factory, 2001, TFCK-87263)
- The Man Who Lives For Love CD (Yep Roc Records, 2006, YEP 2078)
