= Brenda Patterson =

American blues singer

Brenda Patterson is an American blues singer, based in Memphis, Tennessee, United States.

Patterson, at the time of her early albums, was married to the songwriter Domingo "Sam" Samudio, and was a backing singer for Ry Cooder and Bob Dylan. Her self-titled 1973 album, released on Playboy Records, featured contributions from John Kahn and Merl Saunders.

== Discography ==
=== Albums ===
- Keep on Keepin' On, 1970
- Brenda Patterson, 1973
- Like Good Wine, 1974
- The Coon Elder Band Featuring Brenda Patterson, The Coon Elder Band Featuring Brenda Patterson, 1977
- Cooley's House, 1999

=== Singles ===
- "Jesus on the Mainline", 1972
- "Dance With Me Henry", 1973
- "End of the Road", 1973
- "Mr. Guitar", 1974
