= Hemispheres (Lily Afshar album) =

Album by Lily Afshar

Studio album by Lily Afshar
- Released: 2006
- Genre: Contemporary classical music
- Length: 55:08
- Label: Archer Records
- Producer: Lily Afshar

Lily Afshar chronology
Possession	Hemispheres

Hemispheres is the fourth studio album by the classical guitarist Lily Afshar, released in 2006 through Archer Records.

== Track listing ==
No.	Title	Music	Length
1.	"Kara Toprak"	Aşık Veysel, arr. by Ricardo Moyano
2.	"Schnee in Istanbul"	Carlo Domeniconi
3.	"Gozaar (Calligraphy No. 5)"	Reza Vali
4.	"Triptych, Op. 102: Prelude"	Gerard Drozd
5.	"Triptych, Op. 102: Eternal Song"	Gerard Drozd
6.	"Triptych, Op. 102: Dreams of a Clown"	Gerard Drozd
7.	"Prelude"	John Schneider
8.	"Fugato"	John Schneider
9.	"Adagio, Op. 44"	Gerard Drozd
10.	"Danza del Altiplano"	Leo Brouwer
11.	"Fantasia on a Traditional Persian Song "Morgh-eh-Sahar" (Bird of Dawn)"	Garry Eister
12.	"Morgh-eh-Sahar (Bird of Dawn)"	Morteza Neydavoud
13.	"Misionera"	Fernando Bustamante

== Reception ==
The album was well received, called "A skillful combination of contemporary classical music with Persian traditional music". A reviewer wrote of "The naturally warm, rich and resonating guitar sound", and another described the album as "...melodic, with [...] ethnic rhythms".

== Personnel ==
- Lily Afshar - Classical guitar
