= Independence, Mississippi =

- Census-designated place
- Location within the state of Mississippi
- Coordinates: 34°42′28″N 89°48′27″W
- Country: United States
- State: Mississippi
- County: Tate

Area
  - Total: 1.81 sq mi (4.69 km^{2})
  - Land: 1.81 sq mi (4.69 km^{2})
  - Water: 0 sq mi (0.00 km^{2})
- Elevation: 361 ft (110 m)

Population (2020)
  - Total: 200
  - Density: 110.4/sq mi (42.62/km^{2})
- Time zone: UTC-6 (Central (CST))
  - Summer (DST): UTC-5 (CDT)
- ZIP code: 38638
- Area code: 662
- GNIS feature ID: 2812743

Independence is a census-designated place (CDP) and unincorporated community in Tate County, Mississippi, United States.

The settlement is approximately 7 miles (11 km) south of Cockrum and 11 miles (18 km) east of Coldwater along Mississippi Highway 305.

Per the 2020 Census, the population was 200.

== History ==
The settlement was first known as "Flewellenes Crossroads" and "Buck Snorts".

During the Civil War, R.W. Locke organized a company of soldiers in Buck Snorts, which was dispatched to Virginia where they became Company D of the 42d Mississippi Infantry Regiment. Locke was elected company captain.

The population in 1900 was 100.

By 1907, Independence had a post office, several stores/businesses, two churches, and a public school.

== Demographics ==
Historical population
Census	Pop.	Note	%±
2020	200		—
U.S. Decennial Census; 2020

Independence was first listed as a census designated place in the 2020 U.S. census.

=== 2020 census ===
Independence CDP, Mississippi – Racial and ethnic composition Note: the US Census treats Hispanic/Latino as an ethnic category. This table excludes Latinos from the racial categories and assigns them to a separate category. Hispanics/Latinos may be of any race.
Race / Ethnicity (NH = Non-Hispanic)	Pop 2020	% 2020
White alone (NH)	159	79.50%
Black or African American alone (NH)	20	10.00%
Native American or Alaska Native alone (NH)	0	0.00%
Asian alone (NH)	0	0.00%
Native Hawaiian or Pacific Islander alone (NH)	0	0.00%
Other race alone (NH)	1	0.50%
Mixed race or Multiracial (NH)	12	6.00%
Hispanic or Latino (any race)	8	4.00%
Total	200	100.00%

== Education ==
It is in the Tate County School District.

== Notable people ==
- R.L. Burnside, blues musician.
- Hugh Freeze, Head football coach of The Auburn Tigers.
- Michael Conner Humphreys, actor who played Young Forrest Gump in Forrest Gump
