= Shardé Thomas =

American fife player

- Born: January 1990 (age 36); Coldwater, Mississippi, United States
- Genres: Fife and drum; delta blues
- Occupations: Musician; singer
- Instruments: Fife; vocals; drums; percussion; piano; keyboards
- Years active: 2003–present

Shardé Thomas (born January 1990, Coldwater, Mississippi, United States), is an American fife player in the vanishing American fife and drum blues tradition. She is the granddaughter of Othar Turner, who founded the Rising Star Fife and Drum Band, and cousin to bandmate Andre Turner Evans. She plays a homemade cane fife.

== Career ==
Martin Scorsese featured her grandfather, Othar Turner, in the 2003 PBS mini-series, The Blues, as a link between African rhythms and American blues. This concept was continued on the 2003 album Mississippi to Mali by Corey Harris. The album was dedicated to Turner, who died a week before he was scheduled to record for the album. Thomas, then 12 years old, filled in for the recording sessions.

In 2003, her band was at South by Southwest Music Festival. In 2008, she performed in "The Heritage Project" in New York City, and in 2009, at the New Orleans Jazz & Heritage Festival.

== Discography ==
- 2003: Goin' Over The Hill – Willy Deville Acoustic Trio
- 2003: Mississippi To Mali
- 2010: Hill Country Hoodoo – The Jake Leg Stompers
- 2010: What Do I Do? (CD Baby)
