= Alvin Youngblood Hart =

American singer (born 1963)

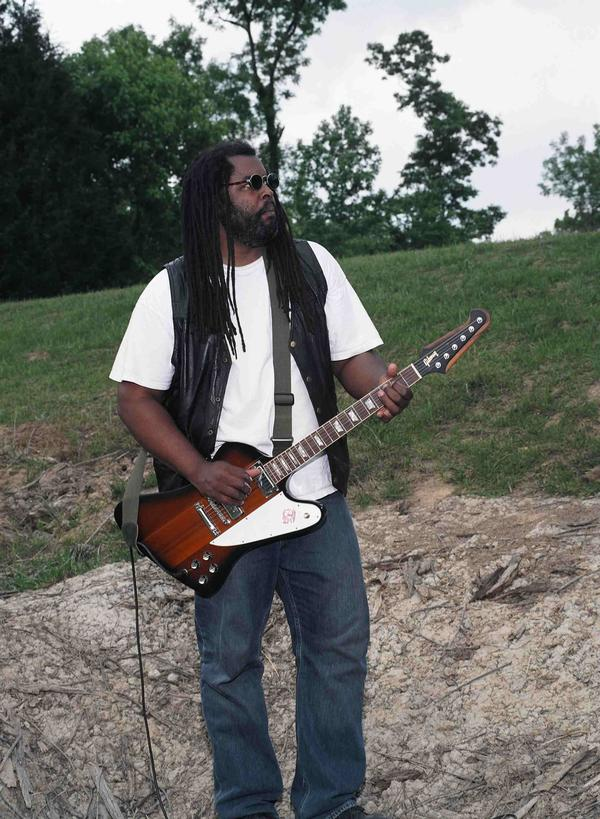

Background information
- Also known as: Youngblood
- Born: Gregory Edward Hart; March 2, 1963 (age 63); Oakland, California, US
- Genres: Blues
- Occupation: Guitarist
- Instruments: Acoustic guitar, electric guitar, banjo, mandolin
- Years active: 1995–present
- Label: OKeh Records
- Website: ayhmusic.com

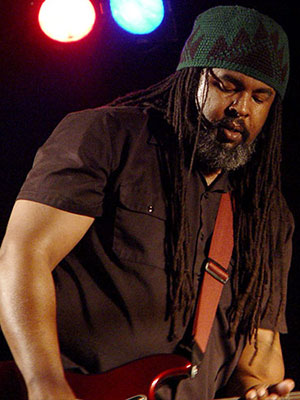
Alvin Youngblood Hart at Djurs Bluesfestival, Denmark (2009)

Alvin Youngblood Hart (born Gregory Edward Hart; March 2, 1963) is an American musician.

== Career ==
Hart was born in Oakland, California, and spent some time in Carroll County, Mississippi, in his youth, where he was influenced by the Mississippi country blues performed by his relatives. Hart is known as one of the world's foremost practitioners of country blues. He is also known as a faithful torchbearer for 1960s and 1970s guitar rock, as well as western swing and traditional country. His style has been compared to Lead Belly and Spade Cooley. Bluesman Taj Mahal once said about Hart: "The boy has got thunder in his hands." Hart himself said, "I guess my big break came when I opened for Taj Mahal for four nights at Yoshi's."

His debut album, Big Mama's Door, was released in 1996 on Okeh Records. In 2003, Hart's album Down in the Alley was nominated for a Grammy Award for Best Traditional Blues Album.

== Albums ==
- Big Mama's Door (1996)
- Territory (1998)
- Start with the Soul (2000)
- Down In The Alley (2002)
- Motivational Speaker (2005)

== Awards ==
- W.C. Handy Award for best new artist – 1997
- Down Beat magazine award for best blues album of the year for Territory, 1999
- Grammy Award in 2005 for producing and contribution to the compilation album, Beautiful Dreamer

== See also ==
- List of blues mandolinists
