= North Mississippi Allstars =

American southern rock and blues band

- The 2003 lineup of North Mississippi Allstars as pictured on their album Polaris (L-R: Duwayne Burnside, Luther Dickinson, Chris Chew, Cody Dickinson)

Background information
- Origin: Hernando, Mississippi, U.S.
- Genres: Southern rock, blues rock, jam band, folk blues
- Years active: 1996–present
- Labels: Tone-Cool, Artemis, Ato, Songs of the South
- Members: Luther Dickinson; Cody Dickinson
- Past members: Carl Dufrene; Duwayne Burnside; Chris Chew
- Website: www.nmallstars.com

North Mississippi Allstars is an American blues and southern rock band from Hernando, Mississippi, founded in 1996. The band is currently composed of brothers Luther Dickinson (guitar, lowebow, vocals) and Cody Dickinson (drums, keyboards, electric washboard, vocals). Their most recent album Still Shakin' was released in 2025.

== History ==
The group was formed in 1996 by brothers Luther and Cody Dickinson (sons of Memphis musician and producer Jim Dickinson), along with bassist Chris Chew, with the intention of combining the blues and bluegrass of the North Mississippi region with rock and other modern forms. Their first album Shake Hands with Shorty was nominated for a Grammy Award for Best Contemporary Blues Album. Their later albums 51 Phantom and Electric Blue Watermelon have received nominations in the same category. The group also won a Blues Music Award for Best New Artist Debut in 2001.

Starting in 2000, the Dickinson brothers and Chew have also participated in supergroup The Word with Robert Randolph and John Medeski. The band made its network television debut in 2000 on Late Night with Conan O'Brien and served as the house band on the program Last Call with Carson Daly for a short period in 2004. Guitarist Duwayne Burnside, son of Mississippi blues musician R. L. Burnside, has often collaborated with the group, and was added as an official member in 2003–2004. The band backed John Hiatt on the album Master of Disaster and the associated tour in 2005.

North Mississippi Allstars albums are known for featuring many guest stars; for example, their 2005 album Electric Blue Watermelon included guest appearances by Lucinda Williams, Robert Randolph, the Dirty Dozen Brass Band, and traditional musician Otha Turner. Luther Dickinson joined the Black Crowes in 2007 and devoted time to both bands until 2011; he appeared on three Black Crowes studio albums. During that period, Cody Dickinson and Chris Chew formed the side project Hill Country Revue.

Chew left the band in 2015. Since then, the Dickinson brothers have led the group with a rotating cast of supporting musicians. Their 2017 album Prayer for Peace reached number one on the Billboard Blues Albums Chart. Their 2019 album Up and Rolling was selected as a "Favorite Blues Album" by AllMusic.

== Members ==
Current members

- Luther Dickinson – guitar, vocals, cigar box guitar, drums, bass (1996–present)
- Cody Dickinson – drums, percussion, vocals, guitar, synthesizer (1996–present)

Former members

- Chris Chew – bass, vocals (1996–2015)
- Duwayne Burnside – guitar, vocals (2003–2004)

Timeline

== Discography ==
=== Albums ===
- Shake Hands with Shorty (2000)
- 51 Phantom (2001)
- Polaris (2003)
- Tate County Hill Country Blues (2003, Private Release)
- Hill Country Revue - Live at Bonnaroo (2004, live)
- Electric Blue Watermelon (2005)
- Paradise Boston, Ma 11.12.05 (2006, Instant Live)
- Keep On Marchin': Live in Burlington, VT 11.11.05 (2007, 2 CDs live)
- Mississippi Folk Music - Volume One (2007)
- Hernando (2008)
- Do It Like We Used to Do (2009, 2 CDs and DVD live set)
- Boulderado: Live at the Fox (2010, 2 CDs live)
- Live in the Hills 6.26.10 (2010, official live bootleg as North Mississippi Allstars Duo)
- Keys to the Kingdom (2011)
- Live In The Hills II 6.24.11 (2011, official live bootleg)
- World Boogie Is Coming (2013)
- Freedom & Dreams with Anders Osborne (2015)
- Prayer for Peace (2017)
- Up and Rolling (2019)
- Set Sail (featuring Lamar Williams Jr.) (2022)
- Still Shakin' (2025)

=== EPs ===
- Shimmy She Wobble (2000)
- Instores & Outtakes (2004)
- Electric Blue Watermelon Screwed and Chopped EP (2005)
- Upstairs At United, Vol. 4 (2012, live)

== Awards and nominations ==
Year	Nominee / work	Award	Result	Ref.
2020	Up and Rolling	Grammy Award for Best Contemporary Blues Album	Nominated	
2020	Up and Rolling	Blues Music Award for Blues Rock Album	Nominated	
2018	Prayer for Peace	Blues Music Award for Blues Rock Album	Nominated	
2018	North Mississippi Allstars	Blues Music Award for Band of the Year	Nominated	
2005	Electric Blue Watermelon	Grammy Award for Best Contemporary Blues Album	Nominated	
2002	51 Phantom	Grammy Award for Best Contemporary Blues Album	Nominated	
2001	Shake Hands with Shorty	Blues Music Award for Best New Artist Debut	Won	
2000	Shake Hands with Shorty	Grammy Award for Best Contemporary Blues Album	Nominated	
