= Archer Records =

American independent record label

Archer Records is an independent record label with notoriety in the classical guitar and Americana genres. The label was founded in 2001 in downtown Memphis by Ward Archer, who founded Cotton Row Recording Studios in 1978 and is a former trustee of the National Academy of Recording Arts and Sciences. It is housed at Music+Arts Studio in Memphis, Tennessee, formerly Sounds Unreel Studio. Located at 1902 Nelson Avenue, the building was converted to a recording studio in 1981 and was purchased by Archer Records owner Ward Archer in 2007. The layout of Music+Arts Studio was designed by George Augsperger and Nashville studio builder David Cherry.

Archer Records' roster of artists includes Amy LaVere, Lily Afshar, Joyce Cobb and more. The label's first release was "Possession" by Lily Afshar in 2002. Afshar has released a total of four albums on Archer Records. She is the first woman in the world to earn a doctorate in classical guitar performance. Her live performances have been reviewed by the likes of The Washington Post and following the release of her most recent Archer Records project, Bach on Fire, Afshar was invited to perform at the National Museum of Women in the Arts.

Archer Records gained visibility in the Americana genre through its work with Amy LaVere. The label released LaVere's "This World is Not My Home" in 2005. PopMatters called it "one of the best albums of 2006."

In addition to its roster, Archer Records also administers a nonprofit label called Blue Barrel Records that launched in 2014. The label's roster includes Mighty Souls Brass Band and Caleb Sweazy.
