= Luther Dickinson =

American guitarist & singer (born 1973)

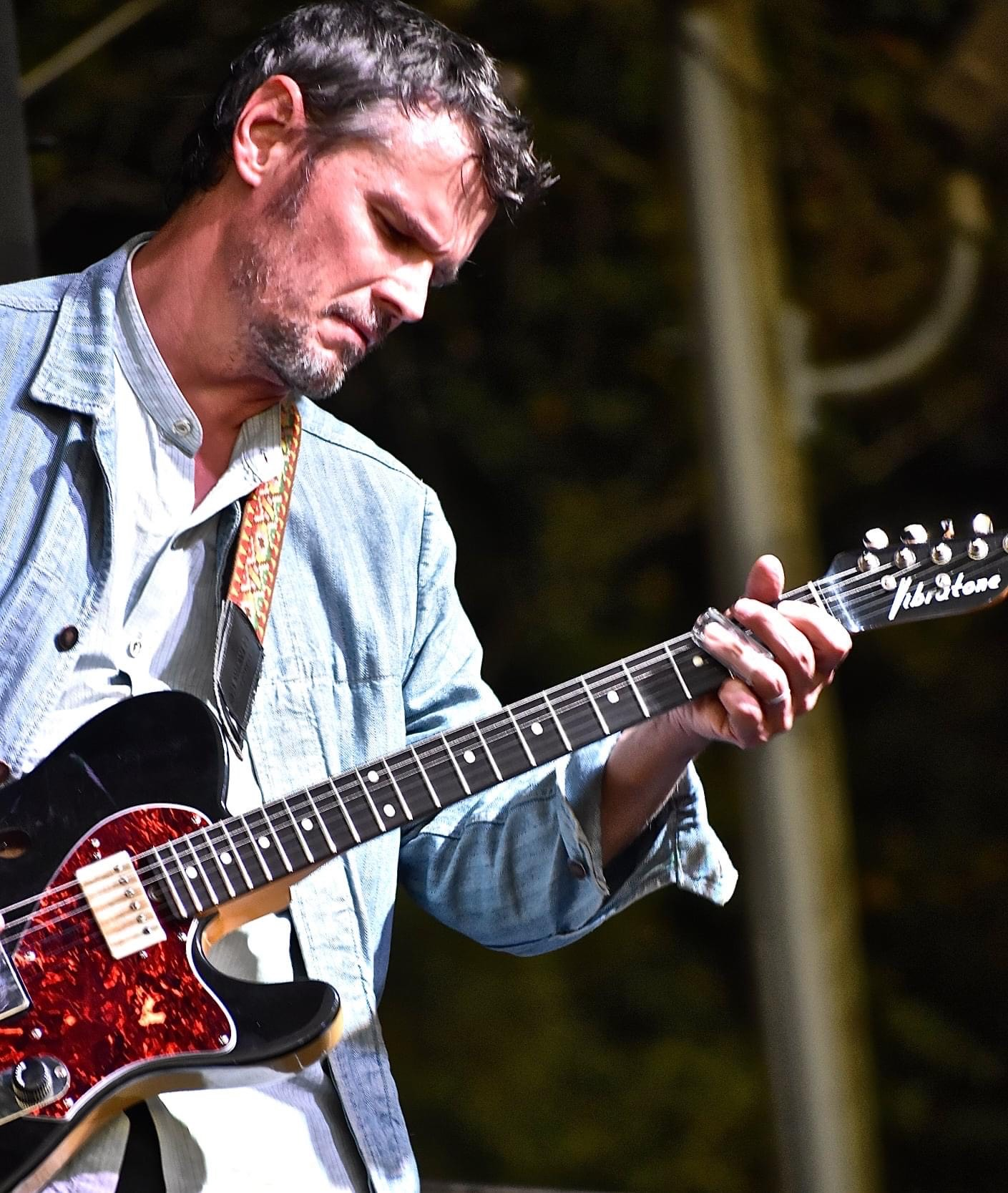
- Dickinson at the Blind Willie McTell Festival September 2021

Background information
- Born: Luther Andrews Dickinson; January 18, 1973 (age 53); Memphis, Tennessee, US
- Genres: Blues, rock
- Occupation: Musician
- Instruments: Guitar, vocals
- Years active: 1987–present
- Labels: New West, Tompkins Square
- Website: www.lutherdickinson.com

Luther Andrews Dickinson (born January 18, 1973) is the lead guitarist and vocalist for the North Mississippi Allstars and the son of record producer Jim Dickinson. He is also known for being a guitarist for the Black Crowes. He hosts Guitar Xpress on the Video on Demand network Mag Rack.

== Career ==
He was born in West Tennessee to Mary Lindsay and Jim Dickinson, a Memphis record producer. Dickinson grew up playing concerts and gaining recording experience with his father and brother, Cody. The family moved to the hills of North Mississippi in 1985. Dickinson made his recording debut in 1987, playing a metal-influenced guitar solo on "Shooting Dirty Pool" on the Replacements' album Pleased to Meet Me, which his father was producing. Dickinson befriended the musical families of Otha Turner, R. L. Burnside, and Junior Kimbrough. They were the inspiration for Luther and Cody Dickinson to form the North Mississippi Allstars in 1996. The North Mississippi Allstars have been nominated for three Grammy Awards in the Best Contemporary Blues category. Dickinson produced two records on Otha Turner, Everybody Hollerin' Goat and From Senegal To Senatobia.

In November 2007, Dickinson joined the Black Crowes. His recording debut with the band was on Warpaint in 2008, and he has since appeared on the 2009 Black Crowes release Before the Frost...Until the Freeze. Dickinson decided not to join the Black Crowes for their 2013 tour. Dickinson currently tours with the North Mississippi Allstars and as a member of the Southern Soul Assembly.

In 2014, Gibson issued a signature model for him, the Luther Dickinson ES-335, with the most notable modification being the P-90 pickups replacing the standard humbuckers.

Jazz critic Ted Gioia chose Blues & Ballads: A Folksinger's Songbook, Volumes 1 & 2 (New West, 2016) for the eleventh spot on his list of the top 100 albums of the year.

His 2019 joint recording with Sisters of the Strawberry Moon, Solstice, was chosen as a 'Favorite Blues Album' by AllMusic.

== Discography ==
=== Solo albums ===
- Onward and Upward (2009)
- Three Skulls and the Truth (Blues Bureau, 2012) with David Hidalgo, Mato Nanji
- Hambone's Meditations (Songs of the South, 2012)
- Rock 'n' Roll Blues (New West, 2014)
- Blues and Ballads: A Folksinger's Songbook, Vol. 1 & 2 (New West, 2016)

=== Singles (78 rpm) ===
- 2012: "Zip-a-Dee-Doo-Dah" / "Beautiful Dreamer" (Tompkins Square)
- 2012: "Nobody Knows the Trouble I've Seen" / "Peace in the Valley" (Tompkins Square)

=== As band member ===
With DDT

- 1994 Some of My Best Friends Are Blues
- 1999 Urban Observer

With Gutbucket

- Where's the Man With the Jive?

With North Mississippi Allstars

- 2000 Shake Hands with Shorty
- 2001 51 Phantom
- 2003 Polaris
- 2004 Hill Country Revue: Live at Bonnaroo
- 2005 Electric Blue Watermelon
- 2006 Instant Live: Paradise Rock Club
- 2007 Songs of The South Presents: Mississippi Folk Music - Volume One
- 2008 Hernando
- 2011 Keys to the Kingdom
- 2013 World Boogie Is Coming
- 2017 Prayer for Peace
- 2019 "Up and Rolling"
- 2022 "Set Sail"

With The Word

- The Word (2001)
- Soul Food (2015)

With Jim Dickinson

- 2002 Free Beer Tomorrow
- 2006 Jungle Jim and the Voodoo Tiger
- 2007 Killers from Space

With the Black Crowes

- Warpaint (2008)
- Warpaint Live (2009)
- Before the Frost...Until the Freeze (2009)
- Croweology (2010)
- Wiser for the Time (2013)

With John Hiatt

- 2005 Master of Disaster
- 2008 Same Old Man

With South Memphis String Band

- 2010 Home Sweet Home
- 2012 Old Times There...

With the Hill Country Revue

- 2009 Make a Move
- 2010 Zebra Ranch

With the Wandering

- 2012 Go On Now, You Can't Stay Here: Mississippi Folk Music, Vol. 3

With Bash & Pop

- 2017 Anything Could Happen

With Sisters of the Strawberry Moon

- 2019 Solstice

=== As guest ===
With Calvin Russell

- 1997 Calvin Russell
- 1997 Soldier
- 1999 Sam

With Jimbo Mathus

- 1997 Play Songs for Rosetta
- 2001 National Antiseptic
- 2003 Stop and Let the Devil Ride
- 2009 Jimmy the Kid
- 2015 Confederate Buddha

With Jon Spencer Blues Explosion

- 1998 Acme
- 1999 Xtra-Acme USA

With Othar Turner

- 1998 Everybody Hollerin' Goat
- 1999 From Senegal to Senatobia

With John Hermann

- 2001 Smiling Assassin
- 2003 Defector
- 2004 Just Ain't Right

With Lucero

- 2001 Lucero
- 2006 The Attic Tapes

With Bob Frank

- 2002 Keep on Burning
- 2008 Red Neck, Blue Collar

With Jim Lauderdale

- 2013 Black Roses
- 2015 Soul Searching: Memphis, Vol. 1/Nashville, Vol. 2

With Danielle Nicole

- 2026 "Take Me Back"

With others

- 1987 Pleased to Meet Me, the Replacements
- 1999 The Tri-Tone Fascination, Shawn Lane
- 1999 Horse of a Different Color, Willy DeVille
- 2003 Who the Hell Is John Eddie?, John Eddie
- 2005 Motivational Speaker, Alvin Youngblood Hart
- 2006 The Man Who Lives for Love, Spencer Dickinson
- 2009 Electric Revival, Zach Williams
- 2009 Truth & Salvage Co., Truth & Salvage Co.
- 2010 Hill Country Hoodoo, Jake Leg Stompers
- 2011 Fixin' to Die, G. Love
- 2012 Candy Store Kid, Ian Siegal & the Mississippi Mudbloods
- 2012 Mutt, Cory Branan
- 2013 American Kid, Patty Griffin
- 2013 Hubcap Music, Seasick Steve
- 2013 Riverman's Daughter, the Grahams
- 2013 Small Town Talk (Songs of Bobby Charles), Shannon McNally
- 2013 Turquoise, Devon Allman
- 2015 Ol' Glory, JJ Grey & Mofro
- 2015 Sonic Soul Surfer, Seasick Steve
- 2015 Wild Heart, Samantha Fish
- 2015 Wolf Den, Danielle Nicole
- 2016 Matters of the Heart, Eric Lindell
- 2017 Belle of the West, Samantha Fish
- 2017 Cypress Hotel, Ben Sparaco
- 2017 Goofer Dust, Hoodoo Men
- 2017 Southern Avenue, Southern Avenue
- 2020 Love & Peace, Seasick Steve
- 2020 Mississippi Suitcase, Peter Parcek

== Awards and nominations ==
Year	Nominee / work	Award	Result	Ref.
2020	Up and Rolling	Grammy Award for Best Contemporary Blues Album	Nominated	
2016	Blues & Ballads (A Folksinger's Songbook: Volumes I & II)	Grammy Award for Best Traditional Blues Album	Nominated	
2012	Hambone's Meditations	Grammy Award for Best Folk Album	Nominated	
2010	Onward and Upward	Grammy Award for Best Traditional Folk Album	Nominated	
2005	Electric Blue Watermelon	Grammy Award for Best Contemporary Blues Album	Nominated	
2002	51 Phantom	Grammy Award for Best Contemporary Blues Album	Nominated	
2000	Shake Hands with Shorty	Grammy Award for Best Contemporary Blues Album	Nominated	
