= Othar Turner =

American fife player (1907–2003)

Othar "Otha" Turner (June 2, 1907 – February 27, 2003) was one of the last well-known fife players in the vanishing American fife and drum blues tradition. His music was also part of the African-American genre known as Hill country blues.

== Early life and education ==
Othar Turner, nicknamed "Otha", was born in Canton, Madison County, Mississippi in 1907. He moved further north, living his entire life in northern Mississippi hill country as a farmer near Como, Mississippi in Panola County. In 1923, aged 16, he learned to play fifes fashioned out of rivercanes and gradually learned other instruments as well.

== Musicmaking ==
In the late 1960s and 1970s, scholars from nearby colleges made field recordings of Turner and his friends' music, as examples of local traditions, but did not release these. Turner's Rising Star Fife and Drum Band (which consisted of friends and relatives) primarily played at farm parties. In the early 1970s the band was called "The Gravel Springs Fife & Drum Band" with Napoleon Strickland, GD Young and "Cag" Young as well as Bernice Turner as members of the group. Turner, along with bandmates Jessie Mae Hemphill and Abe Young, performed as the "Mississippi Fife and Drum Corps" in episode number 1509 of Mr. Rogers' Neighborhood that aired on November 18, 1982.

The group began to receive wider recognition for their Hill country blues in the 1990s. They were included in Mississippi Blues in Memphis Vol. 1 in 1993, followed by inclusion in many other blues collections. They released their critically acclaimed album, Everybody Hollerin' Goat (1998) on Birdman Records. This was followed by From Senegal to Senatobia in 1999, which combined bluesy fife and drum music with musicians credited as the "Afrossippi Allstars".

The title, Everybody Hollerin' Goat, refers to a tradition Turner began in the late 1950s of hosting Labor Day picnics. He would personally butcher a goat and cook it in an iron kettle, and his band would provide musical entertainment. The picnics began as a neighborhood and family gathering. The event grew over the years to attract musical fans, first from Memphis, Tennessee, and later from all over the world.

The song, "Shimmy She Wobble", from Everybody Hollerin' Goat was featured in the 2002 film, Gangs of New York. Martin Scorsese, the film's director, featured Turner in his 2003 PBS mini-series The Blues, discussing the link between African rhythms and American blues. The concept was continued on the 2003 album Mississippi to Mali by Corey Harris. The album was dedicated to Turner, who died a week before he was scheduled to record for the album. His granddaughter and protégé Shardé Thomas, then 12 years old, filled in for the recording sessions.

== Personal life ==
Othar Turner died aged 95, on February 27, 2003. His daughter, Bernice Turner Pratcher, who had been living in a nursing home because of terminal breast cancer, died the same day, aged 48. A joint funeral service was held on March 4, 2003, in Como, Mississippi. A procession leading to the cemetery was led by the Rising Star Fife and Drum Band, with his granddaughter Shardé Thomas, then 13 years old, at its head playing the fife.

== Awards and honors ==
Turner was a recipient of a 1992 National Heritage Fellowship awarded by the National Endowment for the Arts, which is the United States government's highest honor in the folk and traditional arts.

He was nominated for two Blues Music Awards (formerly the W.C. Handy Blues Awards) in 2000 and 2003 in the Blues Instrumentalist: Other category.

In 2009, Turner was honored with a marker on the Mississippi Blues Trail in Como.

== Cultural influence ==
Maurice Watkins portrayed a fife—playing character named Othar in the 2004 Coen brothers' film The Ladykillers.

== Filmography ==
- Gravel Springs Fife and Drum (1971), short film directed by Bill Ferris, recorded by David Evans, and edited by Judy Peiser.
- Homeplace (1975, filmed in 1972), short film by Michael Ford, audio by James Forward. Produced by Yellow Cat Productions, Washington, DC.
- Mister Rogers' Neighborhood (1982), episode 1509: "Friends: Daniel Feels Forgotten"
