= Jim Dickinson =

American musician (1941–2009)

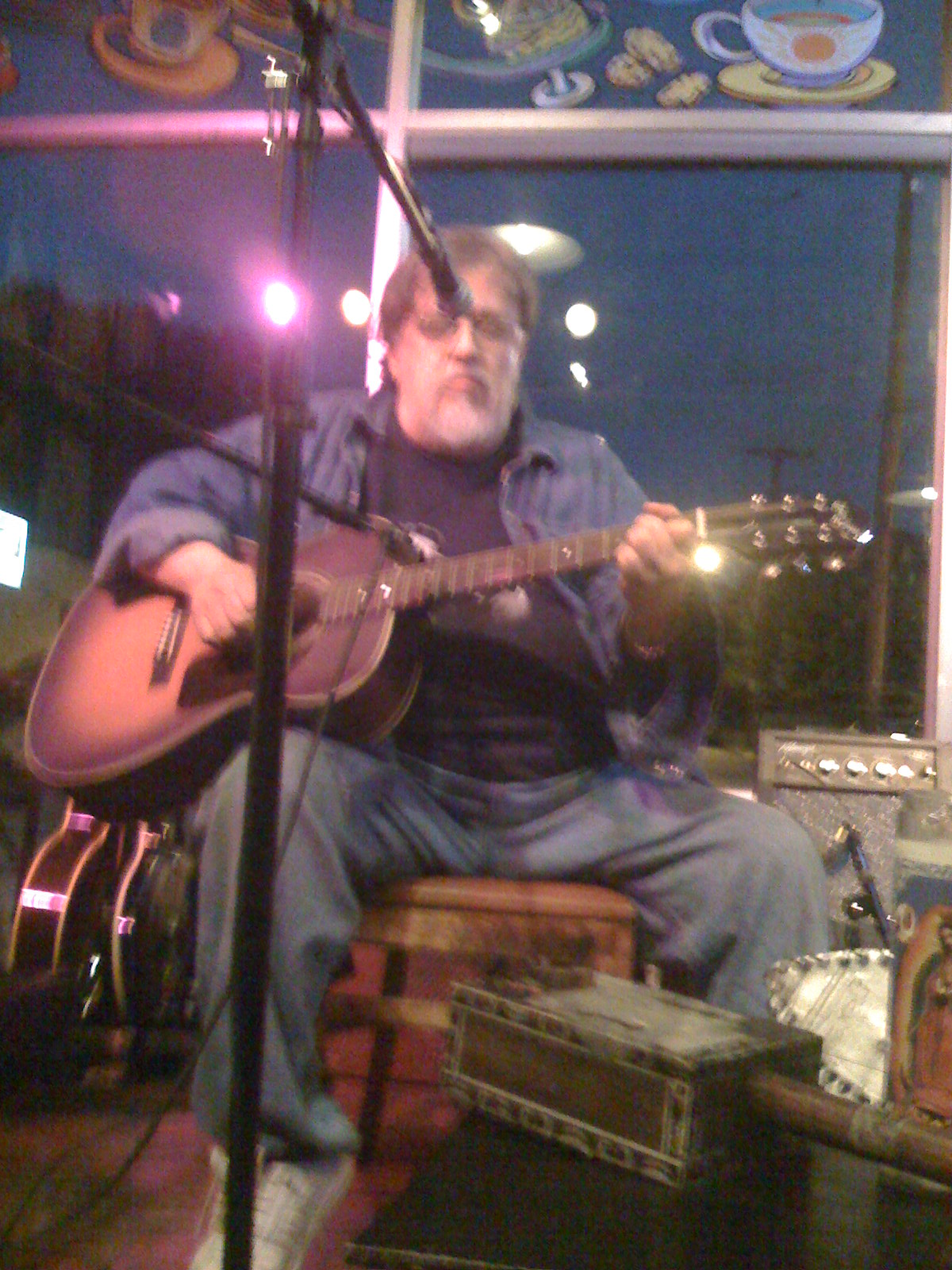
- Dickinson in 2009

Background information
- Born: James Luther Dickinson; November 15, 1941; Little Rock, Arkansas
- Died: August 15, 2009 (aged 67) Memphis, Tennessee
- Occupations: Record producer, musician, and singer
- Instruments: Piano, vocals, guitar
- Formerly of: Mud Boy and the Neutrons

James Luther Dickinson (November 15, 1941 – August 15, 2009) was an American record producer, pianist, and singer who fronted, among others, the band Mud Boy and the Neutrons, based in Memphis, Tennessee.

== Biography ==
Dickinson was born in Little Rock, Arkansas, and raised in Chicago and Memphis. He initially attended Baylor University as a drama major before graduating from Memphis State University, where he became acquainted with the pioneering music journalist Stanley Booth. After receiving his degree, he played on recording sessions for Bill Justis and recorded at Chips Moman's American Studios. Dickinson recorded what has been described as the last great single released by Sun Records—"Cadillac Man" backed with "My Babe", by The Jesters (1966)—playing piano and singing lead on both sides, although he was not a member of the group.

== Early career ==
By 1966, Dickinson began working as a record producer for the famous Ardent Studios, in Memphis, Tennessee, which was founded by John Fry in 1959. The young and eager Dickinson produced and oversaw a series of blistering sessions involving bands like the Bitter Ind (The 31st of February), and the Wallabies. Members of the Wallabies—Alex Major (electric bass, rhythm guitar, harmonica, lead singer and songwriter), Bobby Maxwell (lead guitar, harmony, lead singer on some songs), Alan Palmore (rhythm guitar, harmony, lead singer on some songs and songwriter), and Glen Wilson (drums)—recorded Major's song "Up and Down Children", a marriage of garage rock and a twisted Merseybeat sound. In 2008 the first series of songs were released by Big Beat Records on a compilation album entitled Thank You Friends: The Ardent Records Story and in 2012 on the compilation album The Psychedelic Sound of Memphis.

== Career ==
In the late 1960s, Dickinson joined with fellow Memphis musicians Charlie Freeman (guitar), Michael Utley (keyboards), Tommy McClure (bass) and Sammy Creason (drums); this group became known as the Dixie Flyers and backed a variety of performers, including Bettye LaVette, Hank Ballard, James Carr, Albert Collins and The Tempters.

In 1970, the group began to back Atlantic Records' venerable stable of soul acts at the behest of the producer Jerry Wexler (who was introduced to the group by Booth) following the acrimonious dissolution of his relationship with the Muscle Shoals Rhythm Section. Based at Criteria Studios in Miami, Florida, they recorded Aretha Franklin's 1970 hit "Spirit in the Dark"; over the next year, the Flyers also contributed to recordings by Carmen McRae, Delaney & Bonnie, Jerry Jeff Walker, Dee Dee Warwick, Ronnie Hawkins, Sam & Dave, Dion, Brook Benton, Lulu, Sam the Sham, and Esther Phillips. Unable to acclimate to life in Miami and the variegated production styles of Wexler, Tom Dowd, and Arif Mardin, Dickinson heeded the advice of Duane Allman and left the group to pursue a solo career in 1971. The remaining Flyers backed Kris Kristofferson and Rita Coolidge for several years before ultimately disbanding in the mid-1970s.

Dickinson's first solo album, Dixie Fried, was released by Atlantic in 1972. In addition to the Carl Perkins-penned title song, it featured songs by Bob Dylan and Furry Lewis.

In the 1970s, he became known as a producer, recording Big Star's Third in 1974, and serving as co-producer with Alex Chilton of Chilton's 1979 album, Like Flies on Sherbert. He produced recordings for performers as diverse as Willy DeVille, Green on Red, Mojo Nixon, The Replacements, Tav Falco's Panther Burns, Toots and the Maytals, and Screamin' Jay Hawkins. He appeared in Beale Street Saturday Night, a 1977 aural documentary of Memphis's Beale Street, which featured performances by Sid Selvidge, Furry Lewis and Dickinson's band, Mud Boy and the Neutrons.

Dickinson contributed production and instrumentation to various recordings released on the underground Memphis Tennessee record label Barbarian Records.

As a session musician, he played tack piano with the Rolling Stones for their recording of "Wild Horses" at Muscle Shoals Sound Studio in December 1969; contributed to the Flamin' Groovies' album Teenage Head in 1971; worked with Ry Cooder on nearly a dozen records beginning in 1972; recorded a one-off single ("Red Headed Woman") with the Cramps in 1984. Dickinson played electric piano and pump organ on Bob Dylan's 1997 album Time Out of Mind. Also in 1997, Dickinson produced Ya Gotta Let Me Do My Thing by the Australian band Kim Salmon & the Surrealists. In 1998, he produced Mudhoney's Tomorrow Hit Today.

In May 1999, Dickinson participated in a one-time collaboration with Jules Shear, Harvey Brooks, Paul Q. Kolderie, Chuck Prophet, Sean Slade, and Winston Watson to record the album Raisins in the Sun, released by Rounder Records in 2001.

His sons, Luther and Cody, who played on his 2002 solo album Free Beer Tomorrow and the 2006 album Jungle Jim and the Voodoo Tiger, have achieved success on their own as the North Mississippi Allstars.

Dickinson also made a recording with Pete (Sonic Boom) Kember of Spacemen 3. "Indian Giver" was released in 2008 by Birdman Records under the name of Spectrum Meets Captain Memphis, with Captain Memphis, obviously, referring to Dickinson.

In 2003, Dickinson briefly appeared in The Road to Memphis, part of Martin Scorsese's television production The Blues.

Free Beer Tomorrow (2002) was an album of covers. It included “The Ballad of Billy and Oscar,” by renegade art critic Dave Hickey, and “Hungry Town,” written by Green on Red alumnus / former Dickinson protégé Chuck Prophet, along with Prophet’s main songwriting partner, klipschutz (pen name of Kurt Lipschutz). Prophet and klipschutz were amused but not disappointed that Dickinson changed some of the lyrics, according to an interview with Prophet. In the same interview, Prophet mentioned that his writing partner was credited on the disc as “klipshitz,” probably due to Dickinson’s poor handwriting.

In 2007 Dickinson played with the Memphis-based rock band Snake Eyes. The band, formed by the Memphis musician Greg Roberson (previously the drummer for Reigning Sound), also included Jeremy Scott (also from Reigning Sound), Adam Woodard, and John Paul Keith. The group disbanded in October 2008. Dickinson and Roberson went on to form another Memphis group, Ten High & the Trashed Romeos, with Jake and Toby Vest (of the Memphis band the Bulletproof Vests) and Adam Hill. The band recorded two albums, the first consisting of original compositions by Dickinson and the band, and the second consisting of cover versions of songs originally recorded by Memphis garage rock bands in the 1960s.

== Death ==
Dickinson died August 15, 2009, at Methodist Extended Care Hospital in Memphis, following triple-bypass heart surgery.

== Discography ==
=== Solo albums ===
- Dixie Fried (1972, Atlantic; CD issued by SepiaTone, 2002)
- A Thousand Footprints in the Sand (live) (1997, Last Call, France)
- Free Beer Tomorrow (2002, Artemis)
- Jungle Jim and the Voodoo Tiger (2006, Memphis Int'l)
- Fishing with Charlie (Spoken Word) (2006, Birdman)
- Killers from Space (2007, Memphis Int'l)
- Dinosaurs Run in Circles (2009, Memphis Int'l)
- I'm Just Dead, I'm Not Gone (2012, Memphis Int'l)

=== With Mudboy and the Neutrons ===
- Known Felons in Drag (1986, New Rose)
- Negro Streets at Dawn (1993, New Rose)
- They Walk Among Us (1995, Koch)

=== With Raisins in the Sun ===
- Raisins in the Sun (2001, Rounder)

=== As a compiler ===
- Beale Street Saturday Night (1979, Memphis Development)
- Delta Experimental Project Vol. I (1988, New Rose/Fan Club, France)
- Delta Experimental Project Vol. II (1990, New Rose/Fan Club, France)
- Delta Experimental Project Vol. III (2003, Birdman)

== Bibliography ==
- Dickinson, Jim (2017). I'm Just Dead, I'm Not Gone. Suarez, Ernest, ed. Jackson: University of Mississippi Press. ISBN 9781496810540. Well-written autobiography covering his first thirty years.
- Gordon, Robert (1995). It Came from Memphis. London: Secker & Warburg. ISBN 0-436-20145-3.

Awards
Preceded by Allen Toussaint	AMA Lifetime Achievement Award for Producer/Engineer; 2007	Succeeded by Tony Brown
