= National Register of Historic Places listings in Panola County, Mississippi =

Location of Panola County in Mississippi

This is a list of the National Register of Historic Places listings in Panola County, Mississippi.

This is intended to be a complete list of the properties and districts on the National Register of Historic Places in Panola County, Mississippi, United States. Latitude and longitude coordinates are provided for many National Register properties and districts; these locations may be seen together in a map.

There are 30 properties and districts listed on the National Register in the county.

This National Park Service list is complete through NPS recent listings posted October 2, 2026.

== Current listings ==
	Name on the Register	Image	Date listed	Location	City or town	Description
1	Austin/Saunders/Hawkins House		October 5, 2026 (#100013492)	212 Pointer Street; 34°30′49″N 89°56′11″W	Como	
2	Ballentine-Bryant House	Ballentine-Bryant House	April 9, 1984 (#84002287)	506 Butler St. 34°25′45″N 89°54′38″W	Sardis	
3	Ballentine-Seay House		April 9, 1984 (#84002289)	Pocahontas St. 34°25′45″N 89°55′01″W	Sardis	
4	Batesville Historic District		November 12, 2003 (#03000686)	Roughly along Panola Ave. and Boothe, Court, Church, Central, Kyle, Baker, and Lester Sts. 34°18′56″N 89°57′09″W	Batesville	
5	Batesville Mounds	Batesville Mounds	December 14, 1988 (#88002702)	Along Highway 35 North, west of Interstate 55; 34°20′53″N 89°55′23″W	Batesville	Formerly a restricted address, Batesville Mounds was opened as a public park in 2018
6	Como Commercial Historic District		July 10, 2008 (#08000675)	Roughly bounded by Elder Frank Ward St. on the west, N. Main St on the east, and Church Ave. on the north 34°30′39″N 89°56′33″W	Como	
7	Craig-Seay House		April 9, 1984 (#84002292)	Craig St. 34°30′56″N 89°56′21″W	Como	
8	Crenshaw House		April 9, 1984 (#84002295)	Mississippi Highway 310; 34°30′10″N 90°11′36″W	Crenshaw	
9	Fredonia Church		March 30, 1978 (#78001626)	6 miles (9.6 km) east of Como on Old Union Rd. 34°30′10″N 89°49′40″W	Como	
10	Fredrickson No. 2 (22-Pa-821)		July 28, 1988 (#88001139)	Address restricted	Batesville	
11	Hall-Henderson House		April 9, 1984 (#84002298)	Sycamore St. 34°26′09″N 89°54′54″W	Sardis	
12	Hall-Roberson House	Hall-Roberson House	April 9, 1984 (#84002300)	510 S. Main St. 34°25′33″N 89°54′47″W	Sardis	
13	Holly Grove Site		October 21, 1976 (#76001106)	Address restricted	Sledge	
14	Holy Innocents' Episcopal Church		November 5, 1987 (#87001936)	Junction of Main and Craig St. 34°30′51″N 89°56′31″W	Como	
15	Hufft House	Hufft House	April 9, 1984 (#84002302)	117 Pocahontas St. 34°26′15″N 89°55′10″W	Sardis	
16	Hunt Mound (22Pa980)		December 14, 1988 (#88002701)	Address restricted	Pope	
17	Johnson-Tate Cottage		April 9, 1984 (#84002305)	Stonewall St. 34°26′20″N 89°54′55″W	Sardis	
18	John Curtis Kyle House	John Curtis Kyle House	April 9, 1984 (#84002309)	109 McLaurin St. 34°26′00″N 89°54′52″W	Sardis	
19	Judge John William Kyle Law Office		July 24, 1980 (#80002299)	147 S. Main St. 34°26′11″N 89°54′52″W	Sardis	
20	Lee House	Lee House	April 9, 1984 (#84002312)	201 Booth St. 34°18′46″N 89°57′27″W	Batesville	
21	Nunnally-Carter Family Farm House		October 7, 2026 (#100013517)	4716 Old Panola Road; 34°22′54″N 89°58′07″W	Sardis vicinity	
22	Popular Price Store		April 9, 1984 (#84002316)	Railroad St. 34°30′44″N 89°56′29″W	Como	
23	Short's Hill	Short's Hill	October 16, 1980 (#80002300)	203 Childress St. 34°26′14″N 89°55′22″W	Sardis	
24	Tait-Taylor House		April 9, 1984 (#84002319)	Oak Ave. 34°30′35″N 89°56′20″W	Como	
25	Taylor-Falls House	Taylor-Falls House	April 9, 1984 (#84002321)	Pointer Ave. 34°30′50″N 89°56′14″W	Como	
26	Taylor-Mansker House		April 9, 1984 (#84002327)	Railroad St. 34°30′54″N 89°56′22″W	Como	
27	Taylor-Wall-Yancy House	Taylor-Wall-Yancy House	April 9, 1984 (#84002334)	114 Sycamore St. 34°25′52″N 89°54′51″W	Sardis	
28	Walton-Howry House	Walton-Howry House	April 9, 1984 (#84002339)	308 S. Main St. 34°25′56″N 89°54′57″W	Sardis	
29	Wardlaw-Swango House		April 9, 1984 (#84002341)	Railroad St. 34°30′49″N 89°56′26″W	Como	
30	The Well		December 17, 1982 (#82000579)	East of Sardis on Sardis-Union Rd. 34°27′32″N 89°51′23″W	Sardis	Coordinates in NRIS are off by approximately 0.6 miles (0.97 km)

== See also ==
- List of National Historic Landmarks in Mississippi
- National Register of Historic Places listings in Mississippi
