= Andrew Johnson (architect) =

Swedish–American architect

Andrew Johnson (February 18, 1844 – July 29, 1921) was a Swedish–American architect and contractor He designed 61 documented or attributed buildings in Panola County, Mississippi and at least 16 more in North Mississippi, Tennessee, and Arkansas. Several of his works are listed on the U.S. National Register of Historic Places.

Anders Jönsson was born in the parish of Ovansjö in the county of Gävleborg, Sweden. He was trained at Uppsala University where he received an award from King Charles XV of Sweden for his contest winning design He used the prize money to emigrate to America in 1865, where his building career lasted from 1870 to 1910.

After arriving in the United States, his name was changed to Andrew Johnson. He first settled in a Swedish-American community in Evanston, Illinois. About 1870, he moved to Sardis, Mississippi where he became associated with James B. Cook, an English-trained architect who had moved from London to Memphis, Tennessee in 1855. Johnson served as contractor building the Second Empire style Panola County Courthouse that Cook designed and was built in 1873 and as contractor on at least two other buildings. Johnson and Cook collaborated on at least two other buildings.

== Works ==
- Col. Chap Anderson House, 402 N. Jackson St. Kosciusko, MS, NRHP-listed
- Ballentine-Bryant House, 506 Butler St. Sardis, MS (with son), NRHP-listed
- Ballentine-Seay House, Pocahontas St. Sardis, MS, NRHP-listed
- Byhalia Historic District, Roughly, along Church, Chulahoma (MS 309) and Senter Sts. Byhalia, MS (with sons), NRHP-listed
- Byhalia United Methodist Church, College Ave. Byhalia, MS, NRHP-listed
- Craig-Seay House, Craig St. Como, MS, NRHP-listed
- Crenshaw House, MS 310 Crenshaw, MS, NRHP-listed
- Hall-Henderson House, Sycamore St. Sardis, MS, NRHP-listed
- Hall-Roberson House, 510 S. Main St. Sardis, MS, NRHP-listed
- Holy Innocents' Episcopal Church, Jct. of Main & Craig St. Como, MS, NRHP-listed
- Hufft House, 117 Pocahontas St. Sardis, MS, NRHP-listed
- Johnson-Tate Cottage, Stonewall St. Sardis, MS, NRHP-listed
- John Curtis Kyle House, 109 McLaurin St. Sardis, MS, NRHP-listed
- Lee House, 201 Booth St. Batesville, MS, NRHP-listed
- Popular Price Store, Railroad St. Como, MS, NRHP-listed
- Short's Hill, 203 Childress St. Sardis, MS, NRHP-listed
- St. John's Catholic Church (1872) in Como, Mississippi
- Tait-Taylor House, Oak Ave. Como, MS, NRHP-listed
- Taylor-Falls House, Pointer Ave. Como, MS, NRHP-listed
- Taylor-Mansker House, Railroad St. Como, MS, NRHP-listed
- Taylor-Wall-Yancy House, 114 Sycamore St. Sardis, MS, NRHP-listed
- Walton-Howry House, 308 S. Main St. Sardis, MS, NRHP-listed
- Wardlaw-Swango House, Railroad St. Como, MS, NRHP-listed
