= Senatobia High School =

Coordinates: 34.6232°N 89.9663°W

- 221 Warrior Drive, Senatobia, Mississippi; United States

Information
- Type: Public
- School district: Senatobia Municipal School District
- NCES District ID: 2803930
- NCES School ID: 280393000751
- Enrollment: 461 (2023–2024)
- Colors: blue and gold
- Mascot: Warriors
- Website: Official website

Senatobia High School (SHS) is a public high school at 221 Warrior Drive in Senatobia, Mississippi, United States. It is part of the Senatobia Municipal School District.

Its boundary (it is the sole comprehensive high school of its school district) includes Senatobia and some unincorporated areas.

== About ==
It is a Title 1 eligible school. In 2022, the school's students were 52% Black, 43% White, and 3.4% Hispanic. Blue and gold are the school colors, and the Warriors are the school mascot.

== History ==
C. B. Sisler was the school's principal in 1898. In 1900 T. P. Scott was the school's principal. In 1907 it was documented as serving white boys while Blackbourne College served the area's white girls.

The current school building at 221 Warrior Drive was built in 1938 as a Works Progress Administration project (FEAPWA Project #Miss. 1260) on the site of the former Senatobia Female College. The school's auditorium is Streamline Moderne-style, designed by architects Hull and Drummond, and constructed by Wessell Construction.

An analysis of the school's dropouts from 1955 to 1960 was published in 1962 by Tennessee Agricultural and Industrial State University.

The former campus location of Senatobia High School at 303 College Street is designated as part of a Mississippi Landmark since March 31, 1994; the listing is within the College Street Historic District under the name "Senatobia School Complex," which had also housed the middle school.

In 2015, the school received a preservation grant from the Community Heritage Preservation Grant program for a new roof.

== Sports ==
The Senatobia High School Warriors football team was state champion in 2004. The football team plays at Varner Field. From 2016 until 2022, Brooks Oakley coached the football team, and is an alumnus. Oakley left for South Panola High School and was followed by Carter Norris, another Senatobia alum.

== Alumni ==
- Hugh Freeze, football player
- C. Brinkley Morton, bishop

== See also ==
- List of Art Deco architecture in the United States
- List of high schools in Mississippi
- Magnolia Heights School, Senatobia, a private school
- National Register of Historic Places listings in Tate County, Mississippi
