= James B. Cook =

English-born American architect

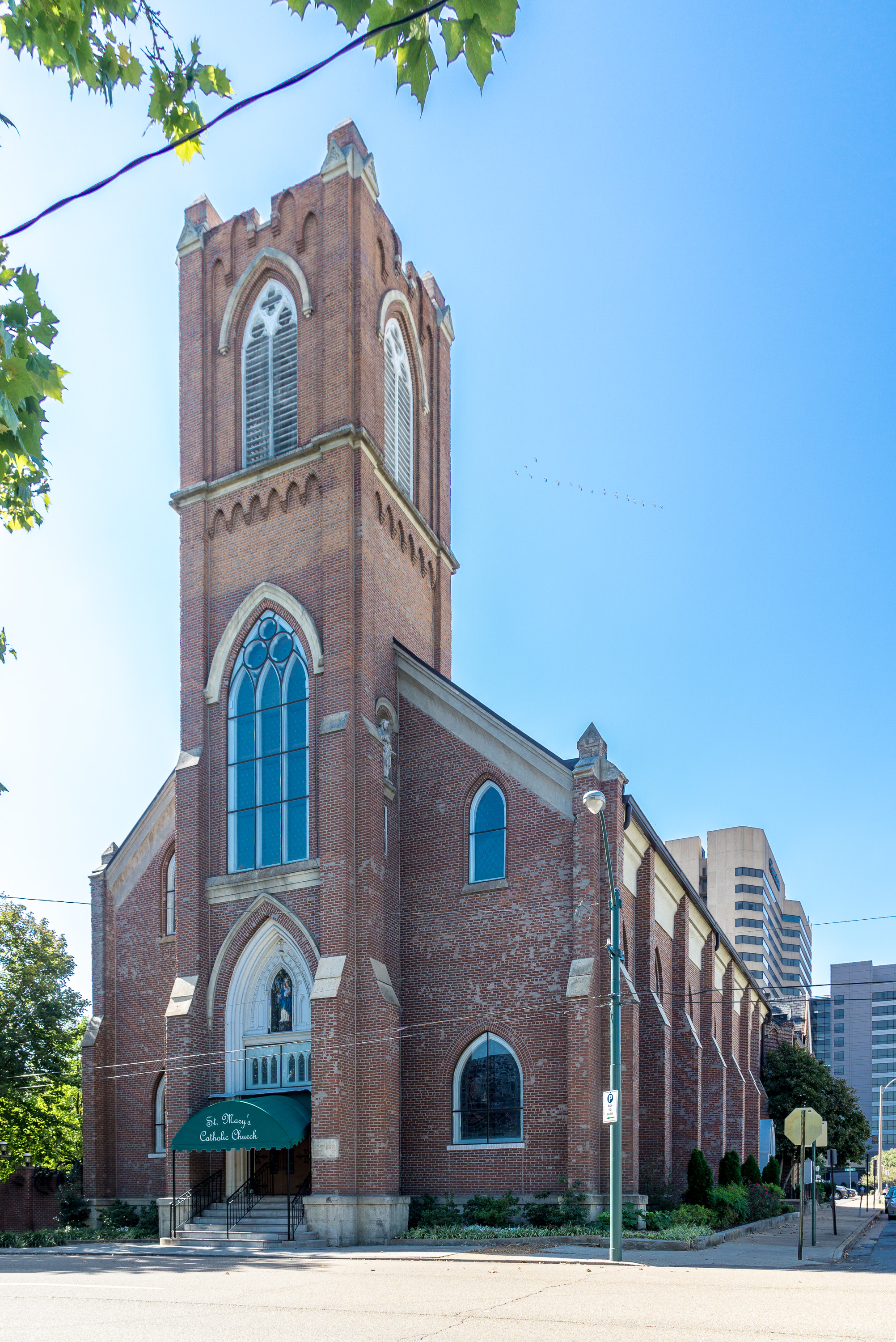
St. Mary's Catholic Church, 155 Market St., Memphis, TN.

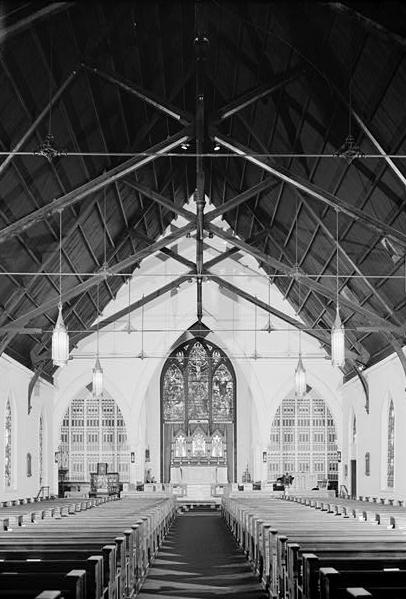
Calvary Episcopal Church and Parish House, Memphis (interior, 1974)

James B. Cook was an English-trained architect who worked in Memphis, Tennessee in the 1800s.

He was born in England and educated at King's College and Putney College. He served as a supervising architect on the construction of the Crystal Palace for London's Great Exhibition of 1851. He immigrated to the U.S. in 1855.

He designed submarines for the Confederate army in the American Civil War.

A number of his works are listed on the U.S. National Register of Historic Places.

- Calvary Episcopal Church and Parish House, (1843), Gothic Revival, 102 N. 2nd St. Memphis, TN, NRHP-listed
- Church of Our Savior, E. Eastport St. between Main and Fulton Sts. Iuka, MS, NRHP-listed
- Grace Episcopal Church, 555 Vance Ave. Memphis, TN, NRHP-listed
- Holy Innocents' Episcopal Church, Jct. of Main & Craig St. Como, MS, NRHP-listed
- Jail Building, Sardis, MS non extant thus not on NRHP
- Panola County Courthouse, Sardis, MS non extant thus not on NRHP
- St. Mary's Catholic Church, 155 Market St. Memphis, TN, NRHP-listed
- Tate County Courthouse, 201 S. Ward St. Senatobia, MS, NRHP-listed
- Trinity Church, Main St. Mason, TN, NRHP-listed

He was associated with Andrew Johnson, a contractor and architect in northern Mississippi.
