= College Street Historic District (Senatobia, Mississippi) =

- U.S. National Register of Historic Places
- U.S. Historic district
- Location within Mississippi
- Location: Roughly bound by North Center, College, North Front, North Panola, North Ward, and West Main Streets, Senatobia, Mississippi, U.S.
- Coordinates: 34.619722°N 89.966667°W
- Area: 13 acres (5.3 ha)
- Built: 1875–1949
- Architectural style: Colonial Revival, Bungalow/Craftsman, Streamline Moderne, and other
- MPS: Senatobia MPS
- NRHP reference No.: 94000206
- Added to NRHP: March 31, 1994

The College Street Historic District is an approximately 13 acres (5.3 ha) historic district in Senatobia, Mississippi, U.S. It is roughly bound by North Center Street, College Street, North Front Street, North Panola Street, North Ward Street, and West Main Street. It has been listed on the National Register of Historic Places since March 31, 1994.

The College Street Historic District is a collection of twenty-three largely residential principal buildings located along or adjacent to College Street in the city of Senatobia. The College Street Historic District is located to the northwest of the Downtown Senatobia Historic District, the core of Senatobia's central business district.

== List of notable buildings ==
- Senatobia Public Works building (c. 1925 – c. 1930), 105 College Street; originally designed as an agricultural store building.
- 303 College Street; this set of buildings is designated as a Mississippi Landmark under the name "Senatobia School Complex"; it includes the Senatobia High School auditorium (formerly known as Senatobia City School; built 1938), the Senatobia Middle School (c. 1959), and a 'classroom annex' (c. 1965) located in separate buildings.
- Spahn House (built c. 1910 – c. 1915), 401 College Street; now the Spahn House Bed and Breakfast
- Senatobia Presbyterian Church (built 1927), 431 West Main Street

== See also ==
- National Register of Historic Places listings in Tate County, Mississippi
