= Fredonia =

Fredonia may refer to:

== People ==
- Samuel L. Mitchill§Fredonia, coiner of the name Fredonia for the country, United States of America

== Places ==
=== Colombia ===
- Fredonia, Antioquia, a town and municipality

=== United States ===
- Fredonia, Alabama, a town
- Fredonia, Arizona, a town
- Fredonia (Biscoe), Arkansas, a city
- Fredonia, Indiana, an unincorporated community
- Fredonia, Iowa, a city
- Fredonia, Kansas, a city and county seat
- Fredonia, Kentucky, a city
- Fredonia Township, Michigan
- Fredonia, New York, a village
- Fredonia, North Dakota, a city
- Fredonia, Ohio, an unincorporated community
- Fredonia, Pennsylvania, a borough
- Fredonia, Gregg County, Texas, an unincorporated community
- Fredonia, Mason County, Texas, an unincorporated community
- Fredonia, Wisconsin, a village
- Fredonia (town), Wisconsin

== Schools ==
- State University of New York at Fredonia, a four-year public college
  - Fredonia Blue Devils, the athletic programs of SUNY Fredonia
- Fredonia High School (disambiguation)

== Historic places in the United States ==
- Fredonia Church, Como, Mississippi, on the National Register of Historic Places
- Fredonia (Spartanburg County, South Carolina), a house formerly on the National Register of Historic Places listings in Spartanburg County, South Carolina (burned)

== Other uses ==
- Republic of Fredonia, a short-lived state created in the Fredonian Rebellion in 1826–1827 by settlers in Texas trying to secede from Mexico
- USS Fredonia (1845), a U.S. Navy bark
- Fredonia (automobile), manufactured in 1904 in Youngstown, Ohio
- Fredonia (grape), a variety of table grape
- Fredonia schooner, a type of schooner

== See also ==
- Fredon Township, New Jersey
- Freedonia (disambiguation)
