= Tony Johnson (tight end) =

American football player (born 1972)

No. 86, 80
- Position: Tight end

Personal information
- Born: February 5, 1972 (age 54); Como, Mississippi, U.S.
- Listed height: 6 ft 5 in (1.96 m)
- Listed weight: 255 lb (116 kg)

Career information
- High school: North Panola (Sardis, Mississippi)
- College: Alabama, Stony Brook University, (MA), University of Alabama, (Ed.D.)
- NFL draft: 1996: 6th round, 197th overall pick

Career history
- Philadelphia Eagles (1996)*; New Orleans Saints (1996–1999); Detroit Lions (2000)*
- * Offseason or practice squad member only

Career NFL statistics
- Receptions: 9
- Receiving yards: 97
- Receiving touchdowns: 1
- Stats at Pro Football Reference

Tony Vincent Johnson (born February 5, 1972) is an American former professional football player who was a tight end for four seasons in the National Football League (NFL). He played for the New Orleans Saints from 1996 to 1999. He was selected by the Philadelphia Eagles in the sixth round of the 1996 NFL draft with the 197th overall pick, but did not make the team. He played college football for the Alabama Crimson Tide.
