= McGehee Plantation =

Historic house in Mississippi, United States

- U.S. National Register of Historic Places
- Location: 50 Ed Nelson Drive, Senatobia, Mississippi, U.S.
- Built: 1856
- Architectural style: Greek Revival
- NRHP reference No.: 07000648
- Added to NRHP: July 3, 2007

The McGehee Plantation is a historic site and former cotton plantation, located at 50 Ed Nelson Drive in Senatobia, Mississippi. The mansion has been listed on the National Register of Historic Places since July 3, 2007, for its architectural significance.

== History ==
The land belonged to the Chickasaw Nation until 1830. In 1854, it was acquired by planter Abner F. McGehee, the son of Hugh McGehee, and nephew of Edward McGehee. The Mississippi and Tennessee Railroad ran through the grounds, making it a desirable business opportunity.

The mansion, designed in the Greek Revival architectural style, was completed in 1856. The mansion was built with the forced labor of enslaved African Americans, who also picked cotton in the fields.

Author Stark Young grew up on the plantation, as his mother was a direct descendant of McGehee. His 1934 novel, So Red the Rose, was based on this plantation, thus the fictionalized version was set in Natchez, Mississippi.

== See also ==
- List of plantations in Mississippi
- National Register of Historic Places listings in Tate County, Mississippi
