= Cameron Lawrence =

Cameron Lawrence may refer to:

- Cameron Lawrence (American football) (born 1991), American football linebacker
- Cameron Lawrence (racing driver) (born 1992), American racing driver
