= Tate County Courthouse =

- U.S. National Register of Historic Places
- Mississippi Landmark
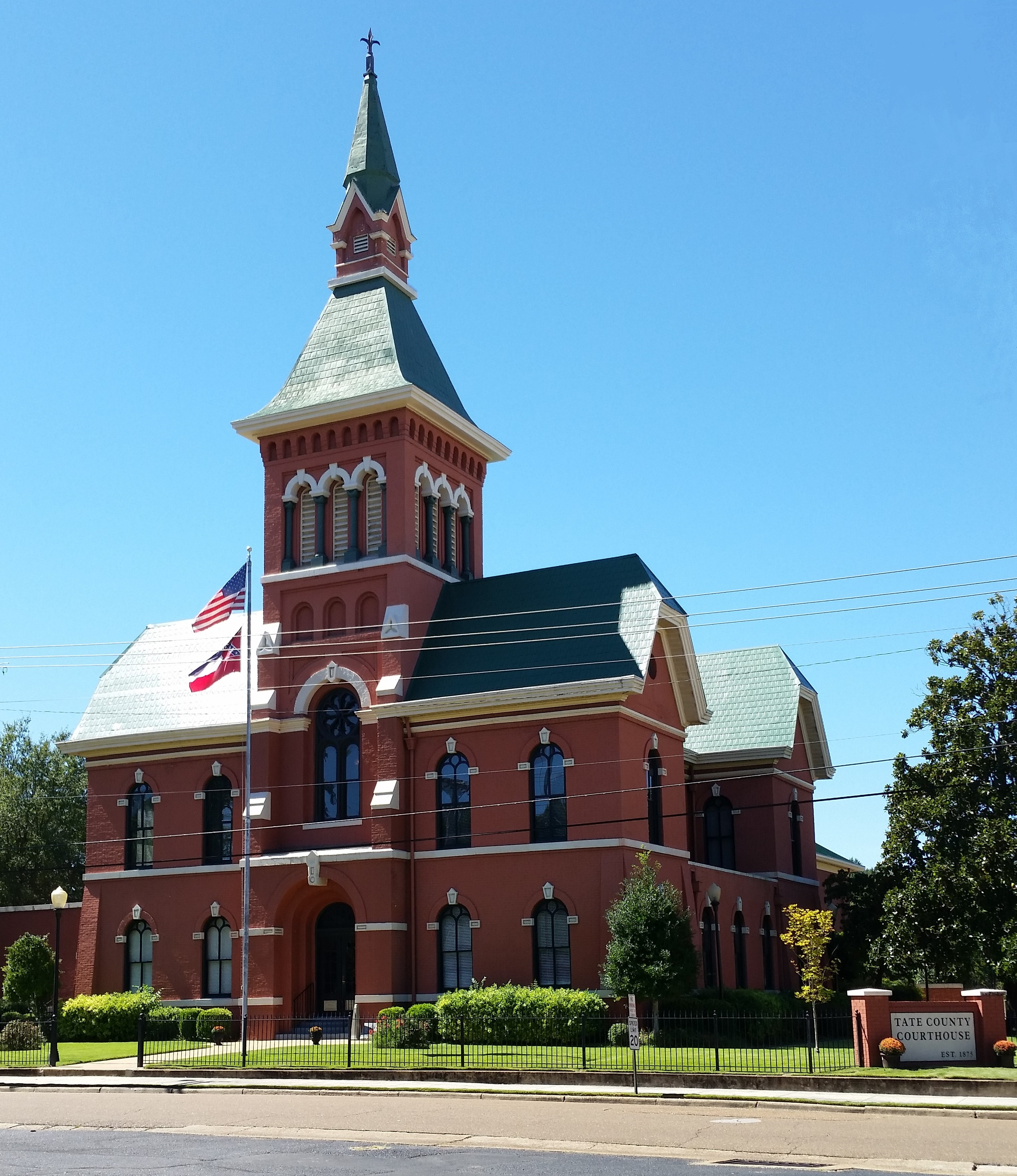

- Location within Mississippi
- Location: 201 South Ward Street, Senatobia, Tate County, Mississippi, U.S.
- Coordinates: 34°37′00″N 89°57′57″W
- Built: 1875
- Architect: James B. Cook, J. H. Cocke
- Architectural style: Romanesque
- NRHP reference No.: 94000200
- USMS No.: 137-SEN-0236-NR-ML

Significant dates
- Added to NRHP: March 30, 1994
- Designated USMS: April 24, 1984

Tate County Courthouse is a historic building constructed in 1875, located at 201 South Ward Street in Senatobia, the county seat of Tate County, Mississippi. The courthouse building operates as a heritage museum, the Tate County Heritage Museum. It is listed on the National Register of Historic Places since March 30, 1994; and a Mississippi Landmark since 1984.

The Romanesque style building was designed by architect James B. Cook in 1873, and constructed between 1875 and 1876 by builder J. H. Cocke. An annex structure was completed in summer 1999.

== See also ==
- National Register of Historic Places listings in Tate County, Mississippi
- List of courthouses in the United States
