= Panola County Courthouse =

Panola County Courthouse may refer to:

- Panola County Courthouse (Batesville, Mississippi)
- Panola County Courthouse (Sardis, Mississippi)
- Panola County Courthouse (Texas), in Carthage, a county courthouses in Texas
