= Freedonia (disambiguation) =

Freedonia is a name for any of several fictitious nations.

Freedonia may also refer to:

- Principality of Freedonia, a defunct micronation
- Freedonia, a side-project band by Christopher Cross
- "Freedonia" (The West Wing), a television episode

== See also ==
- Fredonia (disambiguation)
