= Cole Prosek =

American baseball player (born 2007)

Chicago White Sox
- Second baseman
- Born: June 14, 2007 (age 19); Neenah, Wisconsin, U.S.
- Bats: Left Throws: Right

Cole Arthur Prosek (born June 14, 2007) is an American professional baseball second baseman in the Chicago White Sox organization.

== Amateur career ==
Prosek attended Magnolia Heights School in Senatobia, Mississippi, where he played baseball. He committed to play college baseball at the University of Mississippi for the Ole Miss Rebels. He batted .462 with 16 home runs and 37 RBI as a junior in 2025. During the summer, he played in the Perfect Game All-American Classic at Petco Park and was named the game's MVP. As a senior in 2026, Prosek batted .595 with 18 home runs and 79 RBI and was named the Mississippi Gatorade Baseball Player of the Year. He pitched a complete game and hit a home run in the MAIS Class 4A Division I State Championship, helping lead Magnolia Heights to their eighth straight title. Following the end of his high school career, he was invited to attend the 2026 MLB Draft Combine at Chase Field.

== Professional career ==
Prosek was considered a top prospect for the 2026 Major League Baseball draft. He was selected by the Chicago White Sox with the 41st overall pick. He signed with the team for $3.25 million.
