= Woody English =

American baseball player (1906–1997)

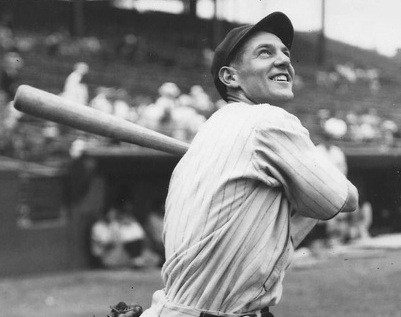
- English, circa 1929
- Shortstop / Third baseman
- Born: March 2, 1906; Fredonia, Ohio, U.S.
- Died: September 26, 1997 (aged 91); Newark, Ohio, U.S.
- Batted: Right Threw: Right

MLB debut
- April 26, 1927, for the Chicago Cubs

Last MLB appearance
- July 1, 1938, for the Brooklyn Dodgers

MLB statistics
- Batting average: .286
- Home runs: 32
- Runs batted in: 422
- Stats at Baseball Reference

Teams
- Chicago Cubs (1927–1936); Brooklyn Dodgers (1937–1938)

Career highlights and awards
- All-Star (1933)

Elwood George English (March 2, 1906 – September 26, 1997) was an American professional baseball shortstop and third baseman. He played twelve seasons in Major League Baseball (MLB) between 1927 and 1938 for the Chicago Cubs and Brooklyn Dodgers. His uncle Paul Carpenter also played professional baseball.

== Early life ==
English was born on March 2, 1906, on a farm in Licking County, Ohio. He went to Newark High School, where he played second base on the baseball team. In English's senior season, the team went undefeated. After high school, English worked for Pure Oil and Firestone Rubber. During breaks, he would play baseball with Pure Oil's local team. In 1924, English played for the semi-pro Zanesville Greys. The league that the Greys played in had other Major League players, including Al Schweitzer.

== Career ==
=== Minor leagues ===
In the following year of 1925, English signed a contract with the Toledo Mud Hens, a Double-A team, a part of the American Association, for $300 a month. Being the youngest player on his team, 18, English played 131 games at shortstop and batted .220 and a .946 fielding percentage. The following year played a team-high 162 games and batted a .301 average, a team-high 15 triples and a .948 fielding percentage.

=== Major leagues ===
After playing for the Mud Hens, English was purchased for $50,000 by the Chicago Cubs. He made his Major League debut on April 26, 1927, an 8-5 loss against the Cincinnati Reds. English went 0–2 with one strikeout. The Cubs finished the season in 4th place, 8.5 games behind the Pittsburgh Pirates.

=== Career statistics ===
In 1261 games over 12 seasons, English posted a .286 batting average (1356-for-4746) with 801 runs, 236 doubles, 52 triples, 32 home runs, 422 RBI, 57 stolen bases, 571 bases on balls, .366 on-base percentage and .378 slugging percentage. He finished his career with a .959 fielding percentage playing at shortstop, third and second base. In the 1929 and '32 World Series, he hit .184 (7-for-38) with 3 runs and 1 RBI.

==== Best season ====
- 1930 .335 BA, 14 HR, 59 RBI, 152 runs, 214 hits, 17 triples, 13 stolen bases, 100 walks, 156 games – all career highs.

== Highlights ==
- 1933 All-Star Game
- Twice led National League in games played (156, 1930–31)
- Finished fourth in National League MVP vote (1931), behind Frankie Frisch, Chuck Klein and Bill Terry
- Between 1952 and 1954 managed the Grand Rapids Chicks of the All-American Girls Professional Baseball League, leading his team to a Championship (1953) and two playoff appearances

== Post-baseball life ==
Following baseball, English decided to work for a factory in Chicago. During World War II, he worked on airplanes. He got married in 1948 to a woman named Katerine. English coached the Grand Rapids Chicks of the All-American Girls Professional Baseball League from 1952 until 1954 when the league folded. After coaching, he worked for State Farm Insurance until his retirement in 1971. On September 26, 1997, English died at Newark, Ohio, at the age of 91 and is buried in Fredonia Cemetery in Fredonia, Ohio.

== Notes ==
- Castle, George (September 1994). Kuenster, John (ed.). "Cubs' Glory Days in 1930 Recalled by Woody English". Baseball Digest. 53 (9). Evanston, Illinois: Lakeside Publishing Company: 83–87. ISSN 0005-609X.
