= Senatobia Municipal School District =

School district in Mississippi

Coordinates: 34.622438°N 89.963666°W

Location
- Senatobia, Mississippi United States

District information
- Type: School district
- Grades: K-12
- Superintendent: Chris D. Fleming
- School board: Dr. Brant Kairit (President), Carol Stigler (Secretary), Dwayne Casey, Jeffery Patton, Cheryl Pegues

Other information
- Website: www.senatobiaschools.com

The Senatobia Municipal School District is a public school district based in Senatobia, Mississippi, United States. As of July 2020, the district's superintendent is Chris D. Fleming.

It includes Senatobia and some unincorporated areas.

== Schools ==
- Senatobia Jr./Sr. High School (Grades 9-12)
  - 2005 National Blue Ribbon School
- Senatobia Middle School (Grades 6-8)
- Senatobia Elementary School (Grades Pre-K-5)

== Demographics ==
=== 2013-14 school year ===
There were a total of 1,834 students enrolled in the Senatobia Municipal School District during the 2013–2014 school year. The gender makeup of the district was 49% female and 51% male. The racial makeup of the district was 46.78% African American, 49.95% White, 2.67% Hispanic, and 0.60% other.

School	Enrollment	Gender Makeup		Racial Makeup			
School	Enrollment	Female	Male	African American	White	Hispanic	Other
Elementary	463	48.4%	51.6%	48.4%	48.2%	2.6%	0.9%
Middle	578	48.1%	51.9%	46.7%	49.5%	3.3%	0.5%
High	793	49.6%	50.4%	45.9%	51.3%	2.3%	0.5%

=== 2006-07 school year ===
There were a total of 1,804 students enrolled in the Senatobia Municipal School District during the 2006–2007 school year. The gender makeup of the district was 49% female and 51% male. The racial makeup of the district was 40.91% African American, 57.43% White, 1.33% Hispanic, and 0.33% Asian. 43.1% of the district's students were eligible to receive free lunch.

=== Previous school years ===
School Year	Enrollment	Gender Makeup		Racial Makeup				
School Year	Enrollment	Female	Male	Asian	African American	Hispanic	Native American	White
2005-06	1,864	49%	51%	0.38%	39.27%	0.91%	–	59.44%
2004-05	1,835	49%	51%	0.22%	36.95%	0.93%	–	61.91%
2003-04	1,738	48%	52%	0.17%	37.05%	0.81%	–	61.97%
2002-03	1,682	49%	51%	0.18%	36.62%	1.07%	0.06%	62.07%

== Accountability statistics ==
	2006-07	2005-06	2004-05	2003-04	2002-03
District Accreditation Status	Accredited	Accredited	Accredited	Accredited	Accredited
School Performance Classifications
Level 5 (Superior Performing) Schools	2	1	2	2	2
Level 4 (Exemplary) Schools	1	2	1	1	1
Level 3 (Successful) Schools	0	0	0	0	0
Level 2 (Under Performing) Schools	0	0	0	0	0
Level 1 (Low Performing) Schools	0	0	0	0	0
Not Assigned	0	0	0	0	0

== 2015 graduation cheering controversy ==
At Senatobia High School's May 21, 2015, graduation ceremony (held at Northwest Mississippi Community College), audience members were asked to hold their applause until the end of the ceremony. Four people cheered as their family member was awarded their diploma, and were subsequently escorted out of the ceremony. School officials then filed disturbing the peace charges against three of them (carrying a possible penalty of up to a $500 fine or 6 months in jail). One person could not be identified, and thus, wasn't charged. In interviews with WREG-TV, one of those accused, said she called out her daughter's name as she received her diploma, while another said he yelled "you did it baby".

Former Superintendent Jay Foster defended the charges, saying "The goal was to allow all graduates to have the privilege of hearing their name called". After the ceremony, Foster contacted Zabron Davis, Chief of Police for Northwest Mississippi Community College, and filed disturbing the peace charges. Those charged were served with arrest warrants about two weeks later. An online petition calling for the charges to be dropped had received over 12,000 signatures by June 7. On June 8, 2015, the school district dropped the charges.

== See also ==
- List of school districts in Mississippi
