= Crenshaw, Mississippi =

- Town
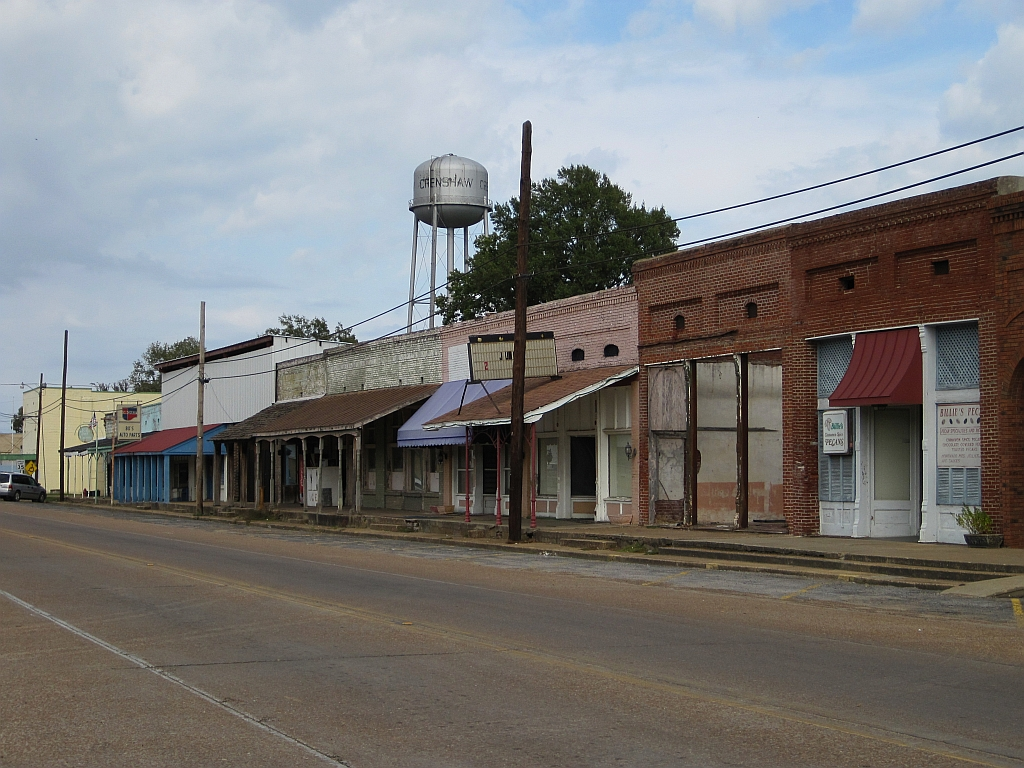
- Downtown Crenshaw

- Location of Crenshaw, Mississippi

- Location in the United States
- Coordinates: 34°30′08″N 90°11′45″W
- Country: United States
- State: Mississippi
- Counties: Panola, Quitman

Area
  - Total: 0.41 sq mi (1.06 km^{2})
  - Land: 0.41 sq mi (1.06 km^{2})
  - Water: 0 sq mi (0.00 km^{2})
- Elevation: 187 ft (57 m)

Population (2020)
  - Total: 638
  - Density: 1,552.3/sq mi (599.36/km^{2})
- Time zone: UTC-6 (Central (CST))
  - Summer (DST): UTC-5 (CDT)
- ZIP code: 38621
- Area code: 662
- FIPS code: 28-16460
- GNIS feature ID: 2406335

Crenshaw is a town in Panola and Quitman counties in the U.S. state of Mississippi, with a population of 638 at the 2020 census.

== History ==
Crenshaw was located on the Yazoo and Mississippi Valley Railroad. By the early 1900s, it had a post office, several stores, churches, schools and a combined oil mill/cotton gin. The bank was founded in 1905.

== Geography ==
Most of the town is in Panola County with a small portion on the west side in Quitman County. In the 2000 census, 697 of the town's 916 residents (76.1%) lived in Panola County and 219 (23.9%) in Quitman County.

According to the United States Census Bureau, the town has a total area of 0.4 square mile (1.1 km^{2}), all land.

== Demographics ==
Historical population
Census	Pop.	Note	%±
1910	358		—
1920	512		43.0%
1930	575		12.3%
1940	623		8.3%
1950	740		18.8%
1960	1,382		86.8%
1970	1,271		−8.0%
1980	1,019		−19.8%
1990	978		−4.0%
2000	916		−6.3%
2010	885		−3.4%
2020	638		−27.9%
U.S. Decennial Census

=== Racial and ethnic composition ===
Crenshaw town, Mississippi – Racial and ethnic composition Note: the US Census treats Hispanic/Latino as an ethnic category. This table excludes Latinos from the racial categories and assigns them to a separate category. Hispanics/Latinos may be of any race.
Race / Ethnicity (NH = Non-Hispanic)	Pop 2000	Pop 2010	Pop 2020	% 2000	% 2010	% 2020
White alone (NH)	253	191	137	27.62%	21.58%	21.47%
Black or African American alone (NH)	652	682	492	71.18%	77.06%	77.12%
Native American or Alaska Native alone (NH)	5	0	1	0.55%	0.00%	0.16%
Asian alone (NH)	1	0	0	0.11%	0.00%	0.00%
Native Hawaiian or Pacific Islander alone (NH)	0	0	0	0.00%	0.00%	0.00%
Other race alone (NH)	0	2	0	0.00%	0.23%	0.00%
Mixed race or Multiracial (NH)	0	3	6	0.00%	0.34%	0.94%
Hispanic or Latino (any race)	5	7	2	0.55%	0.79%	0.31%
Total	916	885	638	100.00%	100.00%	100.00%

=== 2020 census ===
As of the 2020 United States Census, there were 638 people, 351 households, and 239 families residing in the town.

=== 2010 census ===
As of the 2010 United States census, there were 885 people living in the town. 77.2% were African American, 21.6% White, 0.1% Native American, 0.8% from some other race and 0.3% from two or more races. 0.8% were Hispanic or Latino of any race.

=== 2000 census ===
As of the census of 2000, there were 916 people, 339 households, and 244 families living in the town. The population density was 2,213.0 inhabitants per square mile (854.4/km^{2}). There were 385 housing units at an average density of 930.1 per square mile (359.1/km^{2}). The racial makeup of the town was 71.51% African American, 27.84% White, 0.55% Native American and 0.11% Asian. Hispanic or Latino of any race were 0.55% of the population.

There were 339 households, out of which 33.9% had children under the age of 18 living with them, 42.2% were married couples living together, 25.1% had a female householder with no husband present, and 28.0% were non-families. 26.5% of all households were made up of individuals, and 11.2% had someone living alone who was 65 years of age or older. The average household size was 2.70 and the average family size was 3.23.

In the town, the population was spread out, with 30.6% under the age of 18, 9.7% from 18 to 24, 26.6% from 25 to 44, 20.3% from 45 to 64, and 12.8% who were 65 years of age or older. The median age was 32 years. For every 100 females, there were 89.3 males. For every 100 females age 18 and over, there were 81.7 males.

The median income for a household in the town was $20,781, and the median income for a family was $23,393. Males had a median income of $22,727 versus $17,768 for females. The per capita income for the town was $10,372. About 29.0% of families and 28.7% of the population were below the poverty line, including 33.8% of those under age 18 and 24.0% of those age 65 or over.

== Transportation ==
Amtrak’s City of New Orleans, which operates between New Orleans and Chicago, passes through the town on CN tracks, but makes no stop. The nearest station is located in Marks, 19 miles (31 km) to the south.

== Education ==
The Panola County portion of Crenshaw is served by the North Panola School District. Crenshaw Elementary School in Crenshaw, North Panola Junior High School in Como, and North Panola High School in Sardis serve the community. The Quitman County School District serves the portion of Crenshaw that lies in Quitman County.

== Notable people ==
- Gene Lambert, professional baseball player
- Marva Lee Pitchford-Jolly, ceramicist
