= Cameron Lawrence (American football) =

American football player (born 1991)

No. 53
- Position: Linebacker

Personal information
- Born: January 20, 1991 (age 35); Coldwater, Mississippi, U.S.
- Listed height: 6 ft 2 in (1.88 m)
- Listed weight: 240 lb (109 kg)

Career information
- High school: Magnolia Heights (Senatobia, Mississippi)
- College: Mississippi State
- NFL draft: 2013: undrafted

Career history
- Dallas Cowboys (2013–2014)

Awards and highlights
- Second-team All-SEC (2012)

Career NFL statistics
- Games played: 27
- Stats at Pro Football Reference

Cameron Aaron Lawrence (born January 20, 1991) is an American former professional football player who was a linebacker in the National Football League (NFL) for the Dallas Cowboys. He played college football for the Mississippi State Bulldogs.

== Early life ==
Lawrence attended Magnolia Heights High School, where he was a two-way player at quarterback, linebacker and defensive back. As a sophomore, he helped the school win a state title.

As a junior, he tallied 1,854 yards, 26 touchdowns, 138 tackles and 4 interceptions.

As a senior, he was selected to the All-state second-team at linebacker and the Mississippi Association of Private Schools All-star team. He contributed to the team having a 22-2 record in his final two years.

He also lettered in track (finished second in the 300-metre hurdles) and baseball (runner-up at state as a sophomore).

== College career ==
Lawrence accepted a football scholarship from Mississippi State University as an undersized player without a clear position. As a true freshman, he appeared in all 12 games, making 14 defensive tackles, while focusing on the kick coverage units. He played at linebacker, quarterback, wide receiver and safety.

As a sophomore, he played in the first 10 games before suffering a knee injury. He returned for the 2011 Gator Bowl. He finished the season with 31 tackles (2.5 for loss). He had 6 tackles against the University of Kentucky.

As a junior, he earned the starting position at Weakside linebacker. He led the team with 123 tackles (second in the SEC) and was selected to the Rivals.com All-SEC second team. He also recorded 6 tackles for loss, 2 sacks, 2 interceptions and 2 passes defensed. He had 14 tackles (3.5 for loss) against Auburn University. He made 12 tackles (0.5 for loss) and returned an interception 31 yards against the University of Alabama.

As a senior, he registered 120 tackles (third in the SEC), becoming the first MSU player since 1994 with 100-plus tackles in back-to-back seasons. He also recorded 10 tackles for loss, 4 sacks, 2 interceptions, 4 passes defensed, 2 forced fumbles and 2 fumble recoveries. He had 13 tackles against Texas A&M University. He made 15 tackles against Louisiana State University.

== Professional career ==
Lawrence was signed by the Dallas Cowboys as an undrafted free agent after the 2013 NFL draft. On September 1, he was signed to the practice squad. After releasing safety Will Allen, the team promoted him to the active roster on October 11, to play special teams against the Washington Redskins. He finished tied for second on the team with 12 special teams tackles after only playing in 11 games. Injuries in the linebacker corps forced him to play defensive snaps as a backup weakside linebacker during the last 3 games of the season.

In 2014, he registered 4 special teams tackles (tied for ninth on the team), 11 defensive tackles and a sack. He was waived injured on July 28, 2015.

== Personal life ==
Lawrence married Shelby Farmer in April 2016. His brother Addison was an offensive lineman at Mississippi State before being waived by the Baltimore Ravens in 2012.
