= Freedonia =

Fictional nation

Freedonia, Fredonia or Fredon is the name given to several fictional countries. The name was used for some aspects of the United States in the 19th century, and later popularized by the 1933 Marx Brothers film Duck Soup where it was the name of the fictional country in which the film was set. Over time, the word has come to have a more generic meaning, anything from a noun describing a plausible yet fictional country, to an adjective ("Freedonian") used to characterize a place like the Freedonia of Duck Soup. Because the Marx Brothers' film had so many qualities—autocracy, diminutiveness, and obscurity, to name but a few—a place can be described as "Freedonian" for having any one of these qualities.

== Usage ==
=== 19th century ===
==== As a name for the United States ====
Samuel Mitchill suggested that 'Fredonian' be used by citizens of the United States ("Fredon") after the American Revolution in place of the demonym "American", which was then being used as a pejorative term by the metropolitan English to refer to "their inferior and far-removed colonists". In Vol. VI, Part IV, of the Medical Repository, 1803, pp. 449–50, Mitchill, wrote the following under the heading of "Medical and Philosophical News":

Proposal to the American literati, and to all the citizens of the United States, to employ the following names and epithets for the country and nation to which they belong; which, at the distance of 27 years from the declaration and of 20 years from the acknowledgment of their independence, are to this day destitute of proper geographical and political denominations, whereby they may be aptly distinguished from the other regions and peoples of the earth:

Fredon, the aggregate noun for the whole territory of the United States.

Fredonia, a noun of same import, for rhetorical and poetical use.

Fredonian, a sonorous name for 'a citizen of the United States'.

Frede, a short and colloquial name for 'a citizen of the United States'.

Fredish, an adjective to denote the relations and concerns of the United States

Example. Fredon is probably better supplied with the materials of her own history than Britain, France, or any country in the world, and the reason is obvious, for the attention of the Fredonians was much sooner directed, after their settlement, to the collection and preservations of their facts and records than that of the Dutch and Irish. Hence it will happen that the events of Fredish history will be more minutely known and better understood than those of Russian, Turkish, or Arabic. And thereby the time will be noted carefully when a native of this land, on being asked who he is and whence he came, began to answer in one word that he is a Frede, instead of using the tedious circumlocution that he was "a citizen of the United States of America." And in the like manner notice will be taken of the association of Fredonia and Macedonia and Caledonia as a word equally potent and melodious in sound.

==== As a name for Liberia ====
'Fredonia' was one of the names proposed by the American Colonization Society for Liberia.

==== Republic of Fredonia ====
In December 1826, a group of Anglo-American settlers and filibusters led by Empresario Haden Edwards in what is now Texas, declared the "Republic of Fredonia" centered in the town of Nacogdoches. This was the first attempt by Anglo settlers in Texas to secede from Mexico and form an independent state. The republic was short-lived however, lasting only from December 21, 1826 – January 23, 1827, when Mexican soldiers and Anglo militia men from Stephen F. Austin's colony put the rebellion down.

==== Masonic Lodge ====
From about 1810 to 1834, a Lodge of Freemasons under the jurisdiction of The Grand Lodge of Masons in Massachusetts was in existence in the town of Northborough, Massachusetts. It was named Fredonia Lodge.

=== 1930s ===
In the Marx Brothers' film Duck Soup, the tiny fictitious country of Freedonia ("Land of the Brave, and Free") is suffering from severe financial problems; government leaders request a $20 million loan from wealthy Freedonian widow Mrs. Gloria Teasdale (Margaret Dumont) to keep the nation afloat. Mrs. Teasdale agrees to lend the money only on the condition that Rufus T. Firefly (Groucho Marx) be appointed leader of Freedonia. In the musical number that accompanies Firefly's appointment to office, Firefly informs the audience on how the government will be run, singing lyrics such as "The last man nearly ruined this place, he didn't know what to do with it / If you think this country's bad off now, just wait 'til I get through with it." Firefly insults and angers Ambassador Trentino (Louis Calhern) from the neighboring nation of Sylvania, which leads Freedonia into war.

When Duck Soup was released in 1933, the village of Fredonia, New York, complained about the possible negative impact the film might have on the town. The Marx Brothers replied "Change the name of your town. It is hurting our picture." The satirical depiction of Freedonia is said to have led Benito Mussolini to ban Duck Soup in Italy.

=== 1960s ===
In the 1960s, Woody Allen, working on Candid Camera, used Freedonia as a practical joke by asking passersby what they thought of the bid for independence for Freedonia.

=== 1970s ===
In the film Jabberwocky (1977), Freedonia is one of the kingdoms conquered by the King Bruno the Questionable.

=== 1980s ===
The American game publisher FASA's name was originally supposed to stand for "Freedonian Aeronautics and Space Administration". In their first publication (a set of starship deck plans for the game Traveller), the accompanying introduction was signed "Rufus T Firefly, Director".

=== 1990s ===
In the Sierra Entertainment PC game Quest for Glory II: Trial by Fire (1990), the character Ali Chica is a parody of Chico Marx. If a non-player character is asked about Ali Chica after his disappearance, the player is told that he went to Fredonia.

In the 1990s, the satirical magazine Spy pulled a practical joke on several members of the United States Congress. Impersonating a New York radio host (Henry Rose), the magazine successfully convinced several newcomers to Congress to comment on the "ethnic cleansing" in Freedonia, without their realizing that Freedonia was a fictional country. Nick Smith urged caution; James Talent supported action; Jay Inslee warned that inaction would be unacceptable. The story drew commentary elsewhere.

==== Principality of Freedonia ====
The Principality of Freedonia was a micronation based on libertarian principles. It was created as a "hypothetical project" by a group of teenagers in the United States in 1992. The project was formalized as a new country project in 1997, which included attempts in 2001 to lease territory in Somaliland. The attempt to lease land was rejected.

=== 2000s ===
Duck Soup is used as an in-joke amongst characters portrayed as knowledgeable about the film in a Season 3 (2001–2002) episode of The West Wing, while another episode in Season 6 (2004–2005) recalls the general plot details of Duck Soup. In "Enemies Foreign and Domestic", C.J. Cregg, Sam Seaborn, and Toby Ziegler are discussing the relevancy of the North Atlantic Treaty Organization (NATO) in a post-Soviet world. C.J., being briefed by Sam on a number of countries she has to mention as possible new candidates for NATO membership, wonders why Freedonia is being left out of the mix. She goes on to reference Groucho Marx by singing "Hooray for Captain Spaulding" (which was his character in Animal Crackers) under her breath. When upbraided by Toby for not taking the briefing seriously, she asks why her attempt at humor is less valid than Sam's or his. Toby responds that he's heard her joke before, implying that he has seen Duck Soup. Determined that her Marx Brothers references be respected, she ends the sequences of references by offering to pay Toby $500 if he will sing "Lydia the Tattooed Lady" (a song sung by J. Cheever Loophole (Groucho) in At the Circus). During Season 6 the question of the "situation in Freedonia" was asked of a candidate in a Senate debate, and after the candidate said he was studying it, there was no allowed time for the other candidates to challenge him about the existence of the country.

United Kingdom games "Democracy" (2005) and "Democracy 2" (2007) featured Freedonia as a playable country.

In the game Nancy Drew: The White Wolf of Icicle Creek (2007), the character Yanni Volkstaia is an Olympic skier from Fredonia.

In the Doctor Who episode "The Shakespeare Code" (2007), the Doctor claims his companion Martha Jones is from Freedonia. He also claims this in the Doctor Who novel Sting of the Zygons (2007). Although the usage may be intended simply as a plausible name for a country of which the listener (William Shakespeare in the former case) has not heard, it is specifically linked to Duck Soup in at least one official reference work.

=== 2010s ===
In the Australian animated series The Flamin' Thongs (2014), the leader of Freedonia declares war on Australia after Holden Thong's soccer ball lands in his birthday cake and destroys it.

In the film Despicable Me 3 (2017), Gru's brother Dru lives in Freedonia, and the place was shown to have a cheese festival.

== Use in general English ==
"Freedonia" is sometimes used in political editorials and news stories to illustrate a point about another, real country. Sometimes the point being made is that a particular country is so small or remote as to be unknown to its readers. Other times, the term may negatively connote that a real country is run by an autocratic leader who is out of step with his or her people. Still other times the author may simply use "Freedonia" to mean "a fictitious country for the purposes of illustration". Freedonia is the name of the locale where the fictitious lending zoo in Frank Asch's 2016 children's book The Lending Zoo takes place.

== See also ==
- Fredonian Rebellion
- Fredonia (disambiguation)
