= Taylor-Falls House =

Historic house in Mississippi, United States

- U.S. National Register of Historic Places
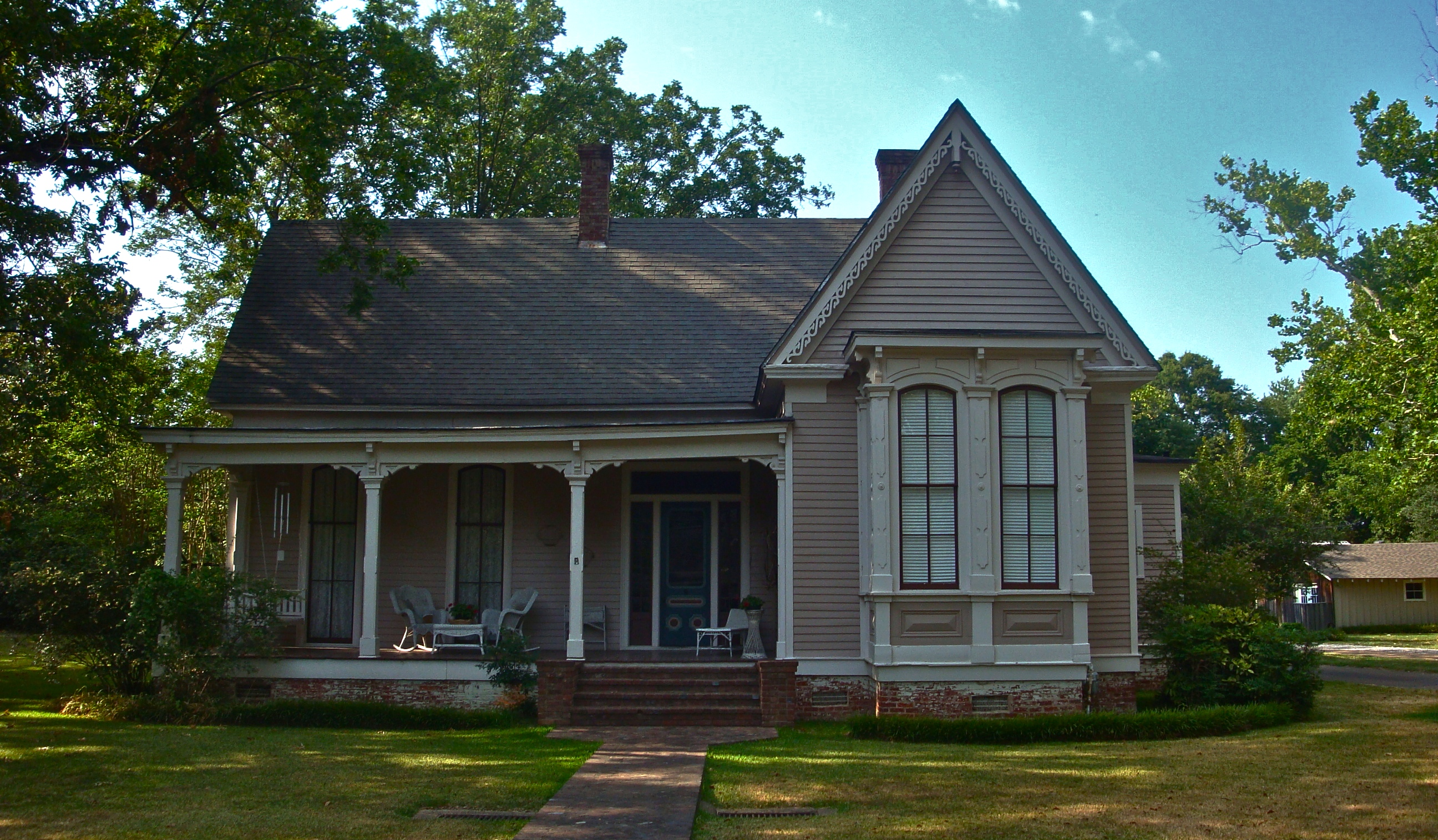
- Taylor-Falls House in 2012

- Location within Mississippi Location within the United States
- Location: Pointer Ave., Como, Mississippi
- Coordinates: 34°30′50″N 89°56′14″W
- Area: less than one acre
- Built: 1885
- Architect: Johnson, Andrew
- Architectural style: L-shaped cottage
- MPS: Johnson, Andrew, Architecture in North Mississippi TR
- NRHP reference No.: 84002321
- Added to NRHP: April 9, 1984

The Taylor-Falls House is a historic house in Como, Mississippi, in the United States. It was designed and built by Swedish-American architect Andrew Johnson in 1885. The house was listed on the National Register of Historic Places in 1984.

== Architecture ==
This house is a single story, "gable-roofed, picturesquely massed and irregularly fenestrated frame house."
