= Calvary Episcopal Church (Memphis, Tennessee) =

Historic church in Tennessee, United States

- Calvary Episcopal Church and Parish House
- U.S. National Register of Historic Places
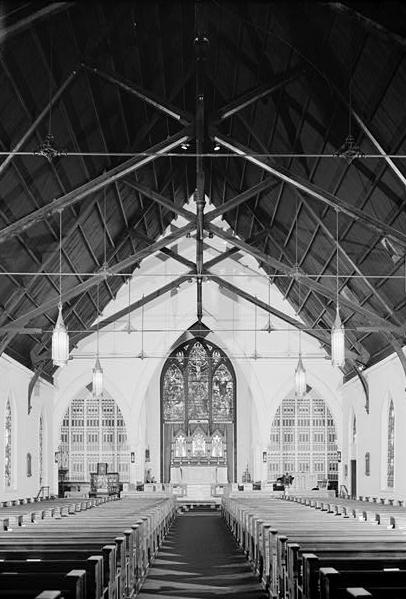
- Calvary Church interior, 1974.

- Location within Tennessee Location within the United States
- Location: 102 N. 2nd St. (at Adams Avenue), Memphis, Tennessee
- Coordinates: 35°8′50″N 90°3′0″W
- Built: 1843
- Architect: Alston, Philip; Cook, James B.
- Architectural style: Late Gothic Revival, Gothic Revival
- NRHP reference No.: 82004039
- Added to NRHP: April 27, 1982

Calvary Episcopal Church, located at 102 North Second Street at Adams Avenue, in Memphis, Tennessee, in the United States, is an historic Episcopal church, founded August 6, 1832 by the Rev. Thomas Wright. The nave (consecrated May 12, 1844) is the oldest public building in continuous use in the city of Memphis and was designed by Calvary's second Rector, The Rev. Philip Alston. There were several later additions: a tower in 1848, the chancel in 1881, the Parish Hall in 1903, and the Education Building in 1992. As Calvary Episcopal Church and Parish House, it was listed on the National Register of Historic Places in 1982.

== Parish Information ==
Calvary is an active parish in the Episcopal Diocese of West Tennessee.

Current clergy are:

Name	Role
The Rev. J. Scott Walters	Rector
The Rev. Amber Carswell,	Associate Rector
The Rev. Paul McLain,	Associate Rector
The Venerable Mimsy Jones	Archdeacon
The Rev. William Kolb	Assisting Priest

The education wing houses the Calvary Place Child Care Center, which serves working parents in downtown Memphis. Since 1928, the volunteer-run Waffle Shop has provided downtown Memphians with a simple weekday lunch during the season of Lent. The profits support outreach ministries of congregations throughout the city.

In 2023 a moving truck full of organ pipes was stolen when being transported back from Boston to the church after being restored. The pipes and the moving truck were eventually discovered after the police received an anonymous tip.

== See also ==
- List of Registered Historic Places in Tennessee
