= Holy Innocents' Episcopal Church (Como, Mississippi) =

Historic church in Mississippi, United States

- U.S. National Register of Historic Places
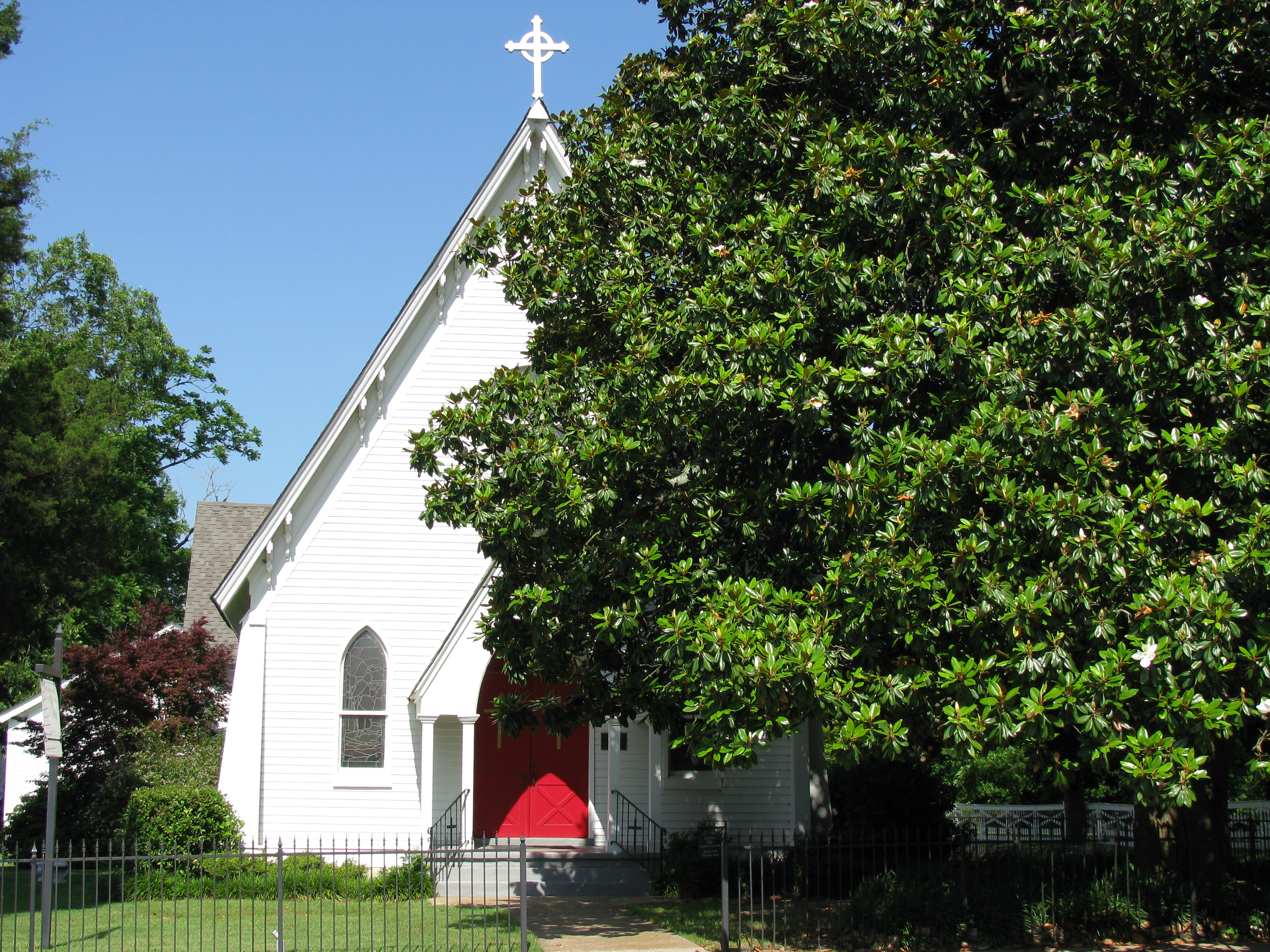
- Front facade in 2008

- Location within Mississippi Location within the United States
- Location: Jct. of Main & Craig St., Como, Mississippi
- Coordinates: 34°30′51″N 89°56′31″W
- Area: less than one acre
- Built: 1873
- Architect: James B. Cook; Andrew Johnson
- Architectural style: Gothic Revival
- NRHP reference No.: 87001936
- Added to NRHP: November 5, 1987

Holy Innocents' Episcopal Church is a historic church building at the junction of Main & Craig Street in Como, Mississippi.

The Carpenter Gothic building was constructed in 1873 and added to the National Register of Historic Places in 1987. It was designed by James B. Cook, an English architect residing in Memphis, Tennessee, at the time this church was built. Construction was done by Andrew Johnson a Swedish architect who went on to design and build 77 structures in the Sardis area. Twenty-one of his homes and buildings are on the National Register of Historic Places.
