= National Register of Historic Places listings in Tate County, Mississippi =

Location of Tate County in Mississippi

This is a list of the National Register of Historic Places listings in Tate County, Mississippi.

This is intended to be a complete list of the properties and districts on the National Register of Historic Places in Tate County, Mississippi, United States. Latitude and longitude coordinates are provided for many National Register properties and districts; these locations may be seen together in a map.

There are 10 properties and districts listed on the National Register in the county. Another 2 properties were once listed but have been removed.

This National Park Service list is complete through NPS recent listings posted October 16, 2026.

== Current listings ==
	Name on the Register	Image	Date listed	Location	City or town	Description
1	College Street Historic District		March 31, 1994 (#94000206)	Roughly along N. Center, College, N. Front, N. Panola, N. Ward and W. Main Sts. 34°37′11″N 89°58′00″W	Senatobia	
2	Downtown Senatobia Historic District	Downtown Senatobia Historic District	March 31, 1994 (#94000205)	Roughly along N. and S. Center, N. and S. Front, W. Main, W. Tate, and N. and S. Ward Sts. 34°37′07″N 89°57′56″W	Senatobia	
3	McGehee Plantation		July 3, 2007 (#07000648)	950 Ed Nelson Dr. 34°33′35″N 89°57′12″W	Senatobia	
4	North Panola Street Historic District		March 31, 1994 (#94000207)	101 S. Panola St. and 104, 106, and 108 N. Panola St. 34°37′07″N 89°58′09″W	Senatobia	
5	North Park Street Historic District		March 31, 1994 (#94000208)	113-209 N. Park St. 34°37′15″N 89°57′48″W	Senatobia	
6	South Panola Street Historic District		March 31, 1994 (#94000204)	200-401 S. Panola St. 34°36′56″N 89°58′06″W	Senatobia	
7	South Ward Street Historic District		March 31, 1994 (#94000199)	Roughly along Church, W. Gilmore, and S. Ward Sts. 34°36′50″N 89°57′58″W	Senatobia	
8	Southeast Senatobia Historic District		March 31, 1994 (#94000202)	Roughly along S. Park, S. Park (West), E. Gilmore, E. Tate, and S. Heard Sts. 34°37′00″N 89°57′40″W	Senatobia	
9	Tate County Agricultural High School Historic District		March 31, 1994 (#94000201)	510 N. Panola St. 34°37′32″N 89°58′09″W	Senatobia	
10	Tate County Courthouse	Tate County Courthouse	March 30, 1994 (#94000200)	201 S. Ward St. 34°37′00″N 89°57′57″W	Senatobia	

== Former listings ==
	Name on the Register	Image	Date listed	Date removed	Location	City or town	Description
1	Hickahala Creek Bridge		November 16, 1988 (#88002479)	March 15, 1996	Spans Hickahala Creek on CR; 34°57′16″N 89°51′39″W	Senatobia vicinity	Removed and relocated to the Cherokee Valley Golf Club in 1994.
2	Senatobia Christian Church		March 30, 1994 (#94000203)	November 8, 1996	407 W Tate St.	Senatobia	Destroyed by fire on August 6, 1996.

== See also ==
- List of National Historic Landmarks in Mississippi
- National Register of Historic Places listings in Mississippi
