= Church of Our Saviour (Iuka, Mississippi) =

Historic church in Mississippi, United States

- Church of Our Savior
- U.S. National Register of Historic Places
- U.S. Historic district
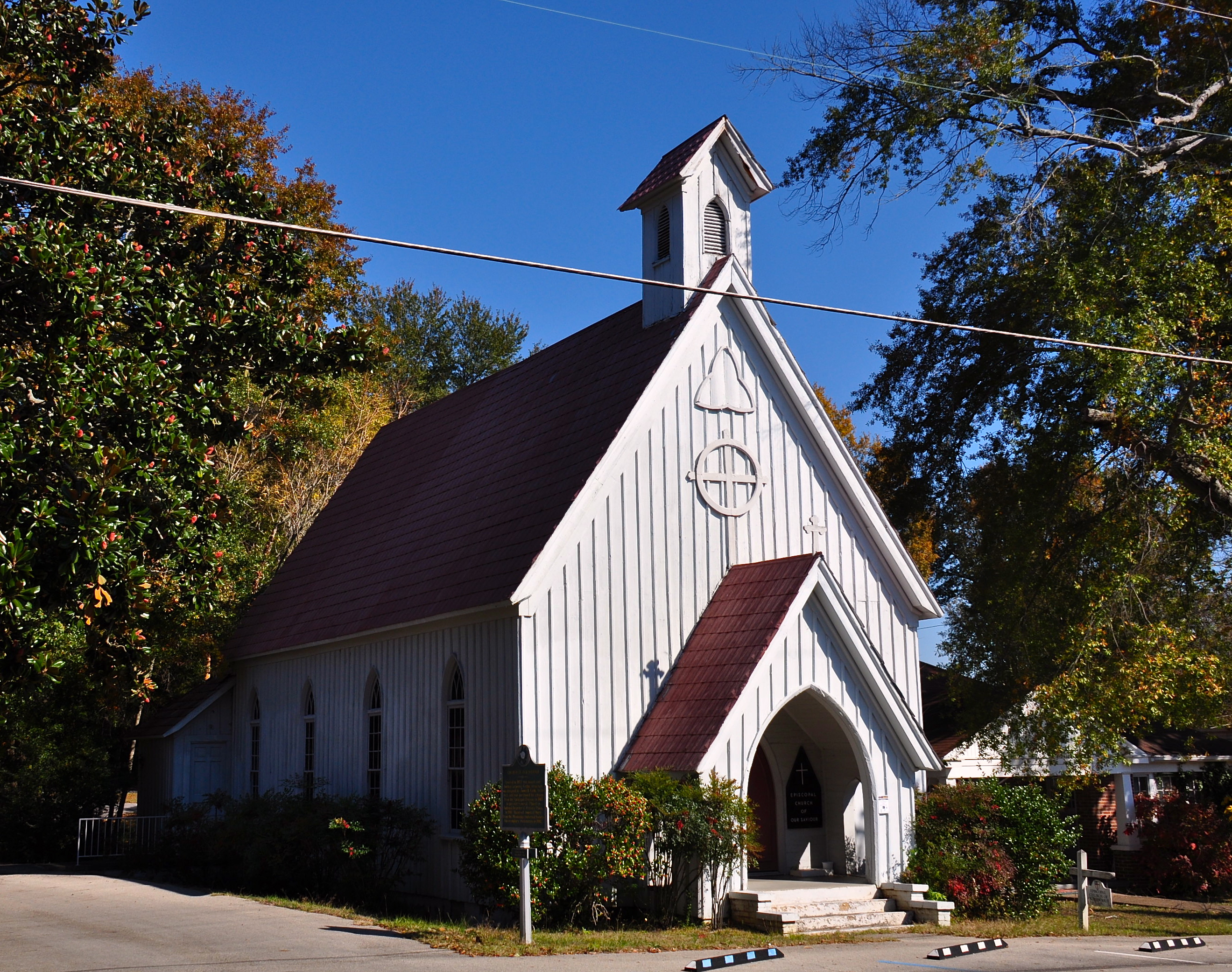
- The Church of Our Savior in November 2013.

- Location within Mississippi Location within the United States
- Location: Eastport Street, Iuka, Tishomingo County, Mississippi
- Coordinates: 34°48′43″N 88°11′23″W
- Area: less than one acre
- Built: 1873
- Architect: James B. Cook
- Architectural style: Carpenter Gothic
- MPS: Iuka MPS
- NRHP reference No.: 91000929
- Added to NRHP: 1992

The Church of Our Saviour is an historic Carpenter Gothic style Episcopal Church located on Eastport Street between Main and Fulton streets in Iuka, Mississippi Designed by architect James B. Cook, it was built in 1873. Its board and batten siding, steep roofs and lancet windows are typical of Carpenter Gothic churches. In order to prevent its removal, local citizens bought it from the Episcopal Diocese of Mississippi in 1985.

It was placed on the National Register of Historic Places in 1991 and was restored in 1992. It is a venue for weddings and other events.
