= St. Mary's Catholic Church (Memphis, Tennessee) =

Historic church in Tennessee, United States

- U.S. National Register of Historic Places
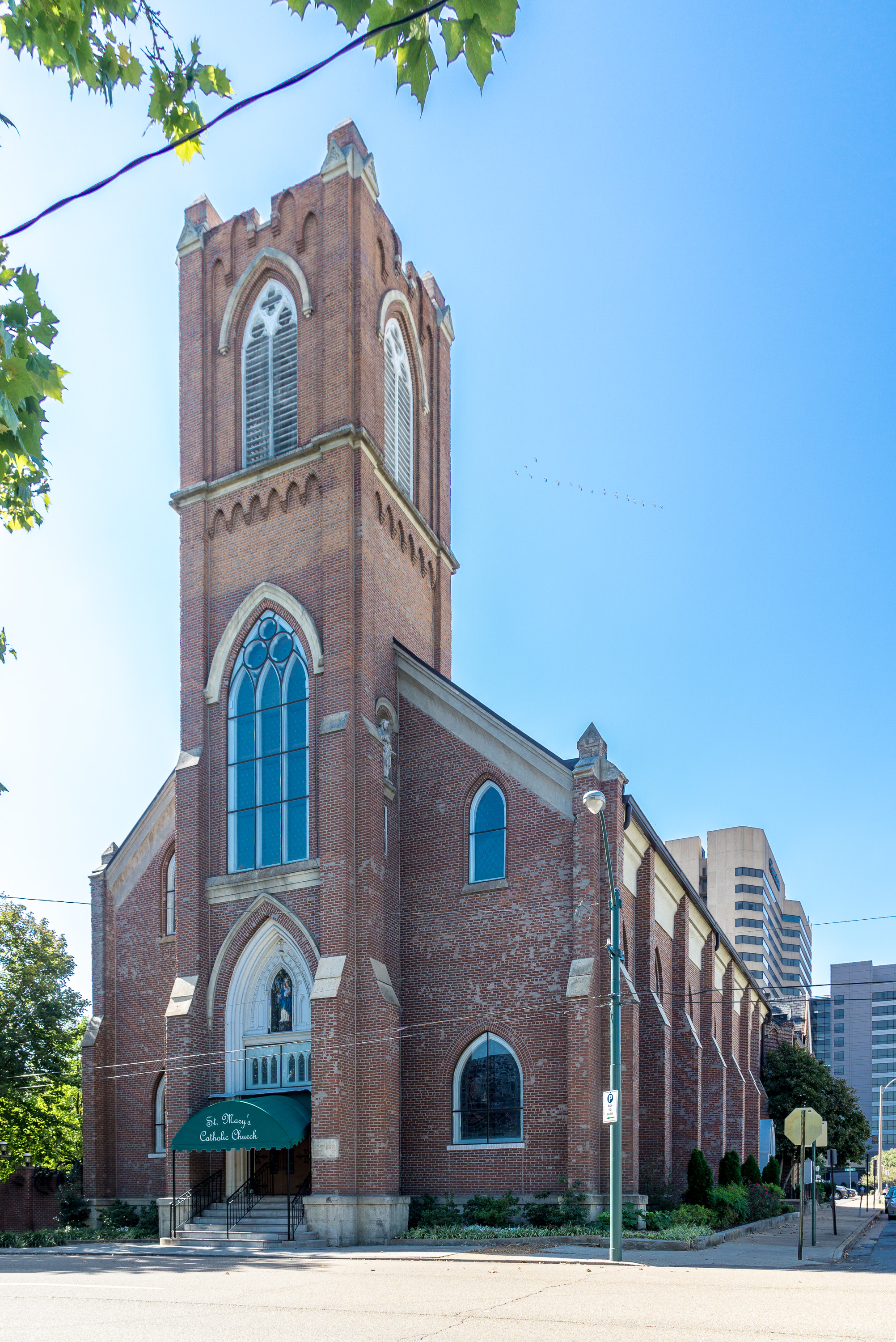

- Location within Tennessee Location within the United States
- Location: 155 Market St. Memphis, Shelby County, Tennessee
- Coordinates: 35°7′3″N 89°58′16″W
- Area: 2 acres (0.81 ha)
- Built: 1870
- Architect: James B. Cook
- Architectural style: Late Gothic Revival
- NRHP reference No.: 74001929
- Added to NRHP: August 7, 1974

St. Mary's Catholic Church, located in the city of Memphis, Tennessee, United States, is a historic Roman Catholic Church. The building is listed on the U.S. National Register of Historic Places, a status it gained in 1974.

== History ==
The church was designed by Memphis architect James B. Cook in the Gothic Revival style. It was dedicated in 1870.

== See also ==
- National Register of Historic Places listings in Shelby County, Tennessee
