= Mason, Tennessee =

- Town
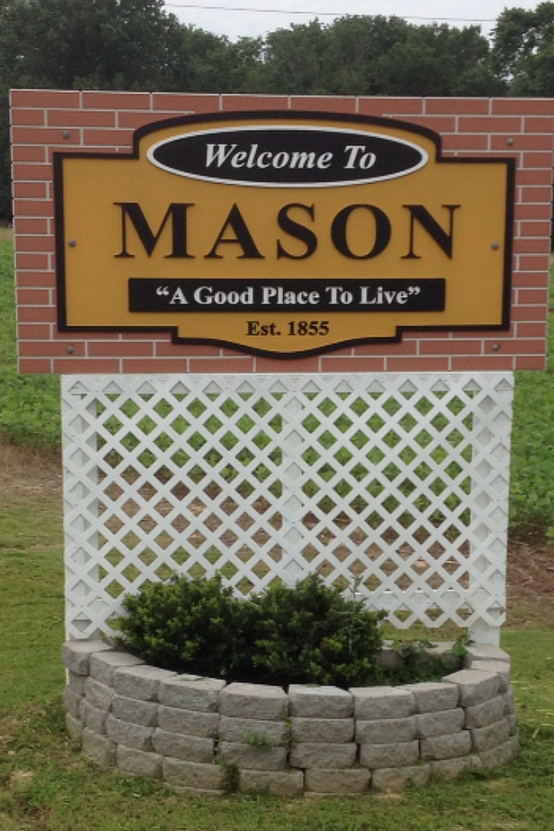
- Motto: "A Good Place To Live"
- Location of Mason in Tipton County, Tennessee.
- Coordinates: 35°24′37″N 89°32′29″W
- Country: United States
- State: Tennessee
- County: Tipton
- Established: 1855

Area
  - Total: 1.98 sq mi (5.13 km^{2})
  - Land: 1.98 sq mi (5.13 km^{2})
  - Water: 0 sq mi (0.00 km^{2})
- Elevation: 315 ft (96 m)

Population (2020)
  - Total: 1,337
  - Density: 674.8/sq mi (260.56/km^{2})
- Time zone: UTC-6 (Central (CST))
  - Summer (DST): UTC-5 (CDT)
- ZIP code: 38049
- Area code: 901
- FIPS code: 47-46420
- GNIS ID: 1292876
- Website: https://townofmasontn.org/

Mason is a town in Tipton County, Tennessee. As of the 2020 census, Mason had a population of 1,337. Mason is located along U.S. Route 70, and is home to a federal detention facility.

== History ==
The first rail service in Tipton County was established in December 1855, when the Memphis and Ohio Railroad completed the route from Memphis to Nashville, running through what is now the town of Mason.

Trinity Church in Mason, built in 1870, was designed by English architect James B. Cook and is listed on the National Register of Historic Places.

In 2022 the State Government of Tennessee fought to gain financial control over the town government. In May of that year the town and the state government had a deal so that the financial control remained with the town government.

== Geography ==
According to the United States Census Bureau, the town has a total area of 1.3 square miles (3.4 km^{2}), all land.

== Demographics ==
Historical population
Census	Pop.	Note	%±
1890	252		—
1900	448		77.8%
1910	391		−12.7%
1920	387		−1.0%
1930	340		−12.1%
1940	448		31.8%
1950	414		−7.6%
1960	407		−1.7%
1970	443		8.8%
1980	471		6.3%
1990	337		−28.5%
2000	1,089		223.1%
2010	1,609		47.8%
2020	1,337		−16.9%

=== Racial and ethnic composition ===
Mason town, Tennessee – Racial and ethnic composition Note: the US Census treats Hispanic/Latino as an ethnic category. This table excludes Latinos from the racial categories and assigns them to a separate category. Hispanics/Latinos may be of any race.
Race / Ethnicity (NH = Non-Hispanic)	Pop 2000	Pop 2010	Pop 2020	% 2000	% 2010	% 2020
White alone (NH)	423	430	350	38.84%	26.72%	26.18%
Black or African American alone (NH)	555	1,014	914	50.96%	63.02%	68.36%
Native American or Alaska Native alone (NH)	19	1	1	1.74%	0.06%	0.07%
Asian alone (NH)	8	3	2	0.73%	0.19%	0.15%
Native Hawaiian or Pacific Islander alone (NH)	0	0	2	0.00%	0.00%	0.15%
Other race alone (NH)	0	2	0	0.00%	0.12%	0.00%
Mixed race or Multiracial (NH)	27	15	24	2.48%	0.93%	1.80%
Hispanic or Latino (any race)	57	144	44	5.23%	8.95%	3.29%
Total	1,089	1,609	1,337	100.00%	100.00%	100.00%

=== 2020 census ===
As of the 2020 United States census, there were 1,337 people, 339 households, and 246 families residing in the town.

=== 2000 census ===
As of the census of 2000, there were 1,089 people, 210 households, and 153 families residing in the town. The population density was 848.8 inhabitants per square mile (327.7/km^{2}). There were 226 housing units at an average density of 176.2 per square mile (68.0/km^{2}). The racial makeup of the town was 40.96% White, 51.52% African American, 1.84% Native American, 0.73% Asian, 2.11% from other races, and 2.85% from two or more races. Hispanic or Latino of any race were 5.23% of the population.

There were 210 households, out of which 41.9% had children under the age of 18 living with them, 41.0% were married couples living together, 22.9% had a female householder with no husband present, and 26.7% were non-families. 23.8% of all households were made up of individuals, and 10.5% had someone living alone who was 65 years of age or older. The average household size was 2.68 and the average family size was 3.12.

In the town, the population was spread out, with 16.1% under the age of 18, 16.6% from 18 to 24, 49.2% from 25 to 44, 12.0% from 45 to 64, and 6.1% who were 65 years of age or older. The median age was 31 years. For every 100 females, there were 276.8 males. For every 100 females age 18 and over, there were 327.1 males.

The median income for a household in the town was $32,404, and the median income for a family was $40,139. Males had a median income of $31,827 versus $25,938 for females. The per capita income for the town was $15,643. About 9.5% of families and 13.4% of the population were below the poverty line, including 18.4% of those under age 18 and 26.8% of those age 65 or over.

== Notable people ==
- John W. Boyd (ca. 1852-1932) ex-slave, became an attorney in Mason; served repeatedly on the County Court and two terms in the General Assembly (1881–84)
- Harvey Hendrick (1897-1941), Major League Baseball former Baseball player and member of the New York Yankees first World Series championship team 1923
- Beebe Steven Lynk (1872–1948) professor of medical Latin botany and materia medica; born in Mason
- John Shelton Wilder (1921-2010), state senator and Lieutenant Governor of Tennessee, born in Mason
