= Trinity Church (Mason, Tennessee) =

- U.S. National Register of Historic Places
- Location within Tennessee Location within the United States
- Location: Main Street, Mason, Tennessee
- Coordinates: 35°24′45″N 89°32′04″W
- Area: 3 acres (1.2 ha)
- Built: 1870
- Architect: James B. Cook (church); Wells Awsumb (parish hall)
- Architectural style: Gothic Revival
- NRHP reference No.: 84003719
- Added to NRHP: March 15, 1984

Trinity Church is a historic church building in Mason, Tennessee, United States. The congregation was established by Reverend John Chilton in 1834. The original church building was completed in 1870, and designed by James B. Cook in the Gothic Revival architectural style. The connecting parish hall was designed by Wells Awsumb in 1964. The entire structure has been listed on the National Register of Historic Places since March 15, 1984. The church features carved walnut pews.
