= John W. Boyd (Tennessee politician) =

American politician

Tennessee House of Representatives
- In office 1881–1885

Personal details
- Born: John William Boyd uncertain Covington, Tennessee
- Died: March 10, 1932 (aged 79–80)
- Resting place: Magnolia Cemetery
- Party: Republican
- Parent(s): Jackson and Martha Boyd

John William Boyd (1841, or ca. 1852 - March 10, 1932) was an African-American ex-slave who became a lawyer. He served as a magistrate in Tipton County, Tennessee and served two terms in the Tennessee House of Representatives from 1881 to 1884. He was a Republican.

== Background ==
Most sources assign a birthdate to Boyd of approximately 1852. Loan documents from 1871 show him as 19 years old, and as being born in Covington, Tennessee. His older brother, [George] Armistead Boyd, was only 19 in 1865 when he joined the Union Army. However, John Boyd's gravestone shows a birthdate of 1841. His parents were Philip and Sophia Fields Boyd, who were slaves to Henry Sanford and his wife Jean Murray Feild [sic] Sanford (both of whose families had moved to West Tennessee from Virginia). He is believed to have been a cousin of William A. Feilds, another African-American Tennessee legislator of the Reconstruction era.

== Career and personal life ==
By the early 1870s Boyd was living in Mason, Tennessee and working as a clerk for local businessmen. At some point, he was admitted to the bar in Covington, presumably after reading law as was then the custom. He would continue to work as a lawyer for the rest of his life, still listing his profession as "attorney" on the 1930 census report.

On March 13, 1879, he married Martha C. "Mattie" Doggett, daughter of Andrew Doggett, a free man of color who had owned property before the Civil War. His brother Armistead married Nannie Doggett, Mattie’s twin sister; although they'd been baptized at Covington Presbyterian Church, John and Armistead were members of the United Methodist Church; the Daggett sisters were Episcopalians. John and Mattie would not leave any surviving children, though the 1910 census reported that Mattie (then 48) had given birth to one child.

== Politics and public office ==
Boyd was a delegate to the Republican state convention in May 1876, and was selected as a delegate from Tennessee's 9th congressional district to the 1876 Republican National Convention in Cincinnati. Boyd was first elected as a member of the county court in 1876 for a six-year term. (A magistrate or "squire" could issue warrants and hear minor criminal cases, perform marriages, and appoint guardians and administrators to help to settle estates. The magistrates also made up the legislative body that approved county expenses and passed county laws and ordinances.) He was re-elected in 1882 and 1888, but in 1894 he either did not run or was defeated. He was returned to the court on March 12, 1897 (apparently to finish an unexpired term) by a two-vote margin over a white Gold Democrat (Boyd was identified in the headline as a free silver man), and was again re-elected in August 1900 for his final six-year term, long after most African Americans in the South had ceased to win election to county or municipal positions. (His brother Armistead and cousin Willis Lewis Fields were both elected to the court in 1882 and re-elected in 1888, but neither won re-election in 1894.)

=== Assembly and Senate ===
Boyd Boyd was first elected to the Tennessee House of Representatives in 1880 to represent Tipton County for a two-year term. In the 42nd General Assembly he served on the standing committees on immigration, new counties and county lines, and tippling houses. He was re-elected in 1882, and moved to the committee on federal regulations. He worked without success to repeal Jim Crow laws but saw one of his own bills transformed into a new Jim Crow bill compelling racial segregation on passenger railroads.

In 1884, Boyd was nominated for the Tennessee Senate seat which represented Tipton and Fayette counties). His opponent was a Confederate Army veteran, Houston Letcher Blackwell, former law partner of Congressman Charles Bryson Simonton. Blackwell was certified the winner, but Boyd challenged the results even after Blackwell's sudden death. Boyd alleged that the ballot box from the heavily-Republican 4th District has been taken away by two Democratic election judges, who then claimed that it had been stolen from them; and that with the ballots contained in the stolen ballot box, he would have been the victor. The Senate rejected his claims, and seated the white Democrat who had been elected in a January special election to fill the vacancy. No African-American would serve in the Tennessee Senate until 1969. Tactics such as Boyd complained of were on the rise in the black belt counties of West Tennessee. By the 1886 and 1888 elections, what one historian described as "some force and a great deal of fraud" enabled white Democrats in that region to suppress the Republican vote, thus creating majorities in the state legislature which in years to come would yield laws such as the "Myers law," the "Lea law," the "Dortch law" and a poll tax.

== After the legislature ==
Boyd continued in practice for some years after his last term as magistrate ended in 1906. By then a widower, he died of heart failure March 10, 1932, and was buried in the segregated Magnolia Cemetery in Mason.

== See also ==
- African Americans in Tennessee
- African American officeholders from the end of the Civil War until before 1900
