= C. Brinkley Morton =

American Episcopal priest (1926–1994)

Charles Brinkley Morton (senior; January 6, 1926 – July 13, 1994) was second bishop of the Episcopal Diocese of San Diego.

== Biography ==
Charles Brinkley Morton was born on January 6, 1926, in Meridian, Mississippi. He attended Senatobia High School, graduating in 1943. He then graduated from Northwest Mississippi Junior College in 1944. From 1944 to 1946, Morton served in the U. S. Army in Europe. After returning to the United States, he attended the University of Mississippi and graduated with a law degree in 1949. Morton practiced law from 1949 to 1956. At the age of 21, Morton was elected to represent Tate County as a Democrat in the Mississippi House of Representatives in 1947, and served from 1948 to 1952. He was then elected to represent the 36th District in the Mississippi State Senate, and served from 1952 to 1956. He then attended the School of Theology at Sewanee: The University of the South, graduating in 1959. He served as Bishop of San Diego from 1982 to 1991, when he retired and returned to Memphis, Tennessee. He died on July 13, 1994, at his home in Memphis, Tennessee.

== See also ==
- List of bishops of the Episcopal Church in the United States of America
