= Fredonia, Ohio =

Unincorporated community in Ohio, U.S.

Coordinates: 40°09′07″N 82°31′12″W

Fredonia is an unincorporated community in Licking County, in the U.S. state of Ohio.

== History ==
Fredonia was laid out in 1829. A post office was established at Fredonia in 1837, and remained in operation until 1900.

== Notable people ==
- Woody English, (1906–1997) was a baseball player with the Chicago Cubs and the Brooklyn Dodgers.
