= Magnolia Heights School, Senatobia =

Segregation academy in Mississippi

Magnolia Heights School

Location
- Senatobia, Mississippi; United States; 34°36′13″N 89°58′15″W

Information
- Type: Mississippi private school
- Motto: "Molding tomorrow's leaders through excellence today"
- Established: August 1970
- Headmaster: Cliff Johnston
- Faculty: 48
- Enrollment: 712
- Campus: Rural
- Campus size: 32 acres (13 ha)
- Colors: Cardinal and Navy
- Mascot: Chiefs
- Website: www.MagnoliaHeights.com

Magnolia Heights School is a private school in Senatobia, Mississippi. The school was established in 1970 as a segregation academy.

== Foundations ==
Magnolia Heights School was founded by Nat G. Troutt, encouraged by a group of citizens who desired segregated education in the Tate County after desegregation. In the school's first session in 1970–71, 233 students attended with the first senior class graduating fifteen students on the front campus of the school. School enrollment in the 2015-16 year was 628. In grades 1–12, 5 of 584, or less than 1%, of students were black.

The school was part of a wave of segregation academies that opened after the court ordered desegregation of Mississippi public schools.

== Academics ==
In 2017, the school claimed a 100% graduation rate, with 100% offered scholarships.

== Notable alumni ==
- Cameron Lawrence, former NFL player
- Addison Lawrence, former football player for Mississippi State
- Cooper Pratt, MLB player for the Milwaukee Brewers
- Cole Prosek, American baseball player drafted by the Chicago White Sox
