= Byhalia United Methodist Church =

Historic church in Mississippi, United States

- U.S. National Register of Historic Places
- Location within Mississippi Location within the United States
- Location: College Ave., Byhalia, Mississippi
- Coordinates: 34°52′12″N 89°41′31″W
- Area: 1.1 acres (0.45 ha)
- Built: 1906
- Architect: Johnson, Andrew
- Architectural style: Late Gothic Revival
- MPS: Johnson, Andrew, Architecture in North Mississippi TR
- NRHP reference No.: 84002276
- Added to NRHP: April 9, 1984

Byhalia United Methodist Church is a historic Methodist church building on College Avenue in Byhalia, Mississippi.

The Late Gothic Revival style building was constructed in 1906. It was added to the National Register in 1984.

Byhalia United Methodist Church is currently led by Rev. Michael-John (M.J.) Pope. He is an ordained Elder in the United Methodist Church.
