= North Panola School District =

School district in Mississippi

Address
- 470 U.S. Highway 51 North Sardis, Mississippi, 38666; United States

District information
- Type: Public
- Grades: PreK–12
- NCES District ID: 2803210

Students and staff
- Students: 1,364
- Teachers: 95.56 (FTE)
- Staff: 142.17
- Student–teacher ratio: 14.27

Other information
- Website: northpanolaschools.org

North Panola High School

Location
- 500 Highway 51 North; Sardis, (Panola County), Mississippi 38666; United States; 40.395729°N 75.262672°W

Information
- Type: Public high school
- Principal: Andre Jones
- Staff: 26.34 (FTE)
- Enrollment: 359 (2023-24)
- Student to teacher ratio: 13.63
- Colors: Red, black and white
- Nickname: Cougars

The North Panola School District is a public school district based in Sardis, Mississippi, U.S.

In addition to Sardis, the district also serves the town of Como and the Panola County portion of Crenshaw as well as rural areas in northern Panola County.

== Schools ==
- North Panola High School (Sardis; Grades 9-12)
- North Panola Junior High School (Como, Grades 6-8)
- Crenshaw Elementary School (Crenshaw; Grades K-5)
- Como Elementary School (Como; Grades PK-5)
- Green Hill Intermediate (Sardis; Grades 3-5)

== Demographics ==
=== 2023-24 school year ===
There were a total of 1,364 students enrolled in the North Panola School District as of the 2023–2024 school year.The gender makeup of district was 50% female and 50% male. The racial makeup of the district was 95.4% African American, 2.8% White, 0.3% Hispanic, 0.1% Asian, 0.3% Native Hawaiian or other Pacific Islander, and 1.1% two or more races.

School Year	Enrollment	Gender Makeup		Racial Makeup				
School Year	Enrollment	Female	Male	Asian	African American	Hispanic	Native American	White
2005-06	1,850	49%	51%	0.11%	97.14%	0.32%	–	2.43%
2004-05	1,866	48%	52%	0.11%	96.73%	0.32%	–	2.84%
2003-04	1,751	49%	51%	0.11%	97.49%	0.06%	–	2.34%
2002-03	1,818	49%	51%	0.11%	97.08%	0.17%	–	2.64%

== Accountability statistics ==
	2006-07	2005-06	2004-05	2003-04	2002-03
District Accreditation Status	Probation	Accredited	Advised	Accredited	Accredited
School Performance Classifications
Level 5 (Superior Performing) Schools	0	0	0	0	0
Level 4 (Exemplary) Schools	0	0	0	1	0
Level 3 (Successful) Schools	0	1	1	1	3
Level 2 (Under Performing) Schools	2	4	4	3	1
Level 1 (Low Performing) Schools	2	0	0	0	1
Not Assigned	0	0	0	0	0

== See also ==
- List of school districts in Mississippi
