= Batesville Mounds =

- U.S. National Register of Historic Places
- Mississippi Landmark
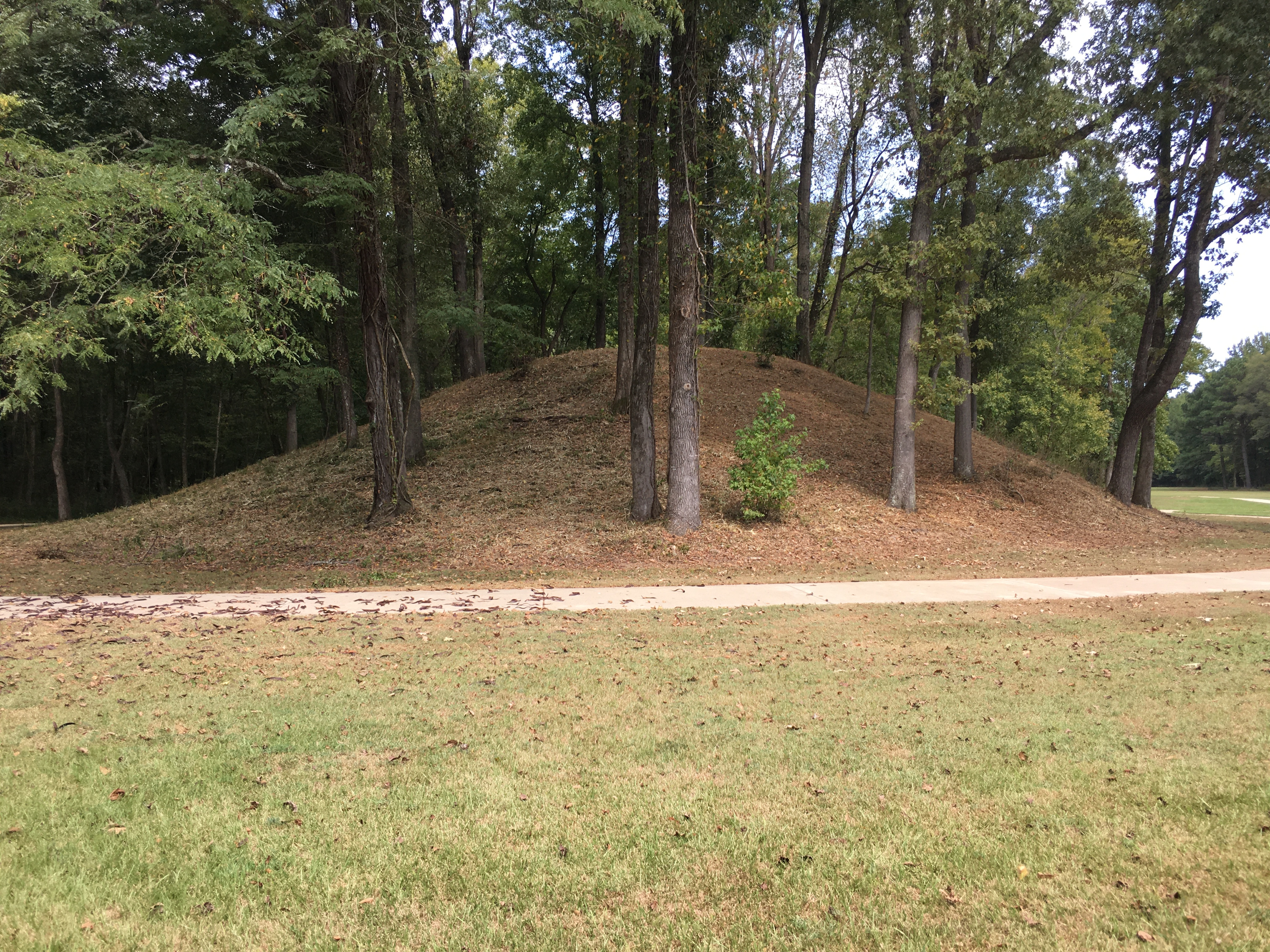
- Mound C at Batesville Mounds 22-Pa-500

- Location within Mississippi Location within the United States
- Nearest city: Batesville, Mississippi
- Coordinates: 34°20′51″N 89°55′25″W
- NRHP reference No.: 88002702

Significant dates
- Added to NRHP: December 14, 1988
- Designated USMS: March 23, 1989

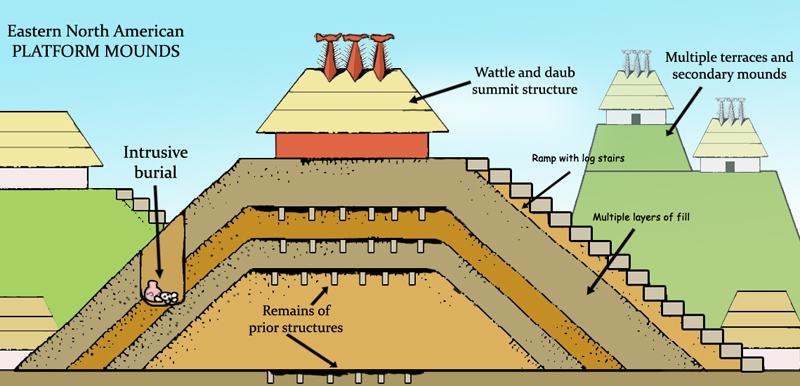
A mound diagram of a platform mound showing the multiple layers and structures such as temples or mortuaries, ramps with log stairs, and prior structures under later layers, multiple terraces, and intrusive burials

The "Batesville Mounds" (22-Pa-500) in Panola County, Mississippi are the conical archeological remains of a culture of indigenous people who flourished in North America. The mounds appear to have served as both habitation and burial sites. They were added to the National Register of Historic Places in 1988.

== Mound builders ==
For centuries, hypotheses have existed about the origins of the mounds ranged from the theory of central Mexico's indigenous peoples building the mounds, to the work of foreign refugees escaping one disaster or another, or to the work of ancient lost tribes. It was the Smithsonian Institution that conducted 13 years of research, ending in 1894, that verified north American indigenous people constructed the mounds.

The mound builders were a variety of pre-Columbian cultures who inhabited the areas of the Great Lakes, the Ohio River Valley, and the Mississippi River valley. Rather than the wigwam of much of the plains peoples, or the pueblo culture of the American southwest, the mound builders created giant earthwork communities. Thousands of mounds have been discovered throughout the continent. Researchers found that the builders had an organized social structure, and charted the cosmos.

== Discovery ==
Mounds A, B, C, D and E were discovered by Calvin Smith Brown in 1926. Believed to have been populated during the Woodland period common era, the mounds were examined and studied again in 1949, by archaeologist William G. Haag. In the ensuing decades, Mound E had ceased to exist. Speculation at the time was that the mound had been destroyed as a result of crop harvesting. The Mississippi Department of Archives and History designated the Bateville mounds as an official Mississippi Landmark on March 23, 1989. Archeological excavations have suggested these specific mounds date to the Early to Middle Woodland period (500-1000 A.D).

== Tourism ==
In January 2018, the city of Batesville opened the site as a public park. Only B and C of the original mounds still exist.
