= Fredonia Church =

Historic church in Mississippi, United States

Coordinates: 34°30′10″N 89°49′40″W

- U.S. National Register of Historic Places
- Location within Mississippi Location within the United States
- Location: 6 mi. (9.6 km) east of Como on Old Union Rd.
- Nearest city: Como, Mississippi
- Area: 6 acres (2.4 ha)
- Built: 1848
- Architectural style: Greek Revival temple form
- NRHP reference No.: 78001626
- Added to NRHP: March 30, 1978

Fredonia Church is a historic church in Como, Mississippi.

The Greek Revival style building was constructed in 1848 and added to the National Register of Historic Places in 1978.
