= Panola County Courthouse (Sardis, Mississippi) =

Coordinates: 34.434209°N 89.918603°W

The Panola County Courthouse in Sardis, Mississippi is one of two county courthouses in Panola County, Mississippi; the other is the Panola County Courthouse (Batesville, Mississippi). Sardis became the second county seat in 1866 and the courthouse was built in 1873. In 1902 a second courthouse was built in Sardis, with L. M. Weathers the architect and M. T. Lewman & Co. the contractor. A third courthouse in Sardis was built by contractor McCain & Associates in 1974 according to a design by Pritchard & Nickles.
