= Fredonia High School =

Fredonia High School may refer to any of the following:

- Fredonia High School (New York) in Fredonia, New York
- Fredonia High School (Arizona) in Fredonia, Arizona
- Fredonia High School (Kansas) in Fredonia, Kansas
