= Downtown Senatobia Historic District =

- U.S. National Register of Historic Places
- U.S. Historic district
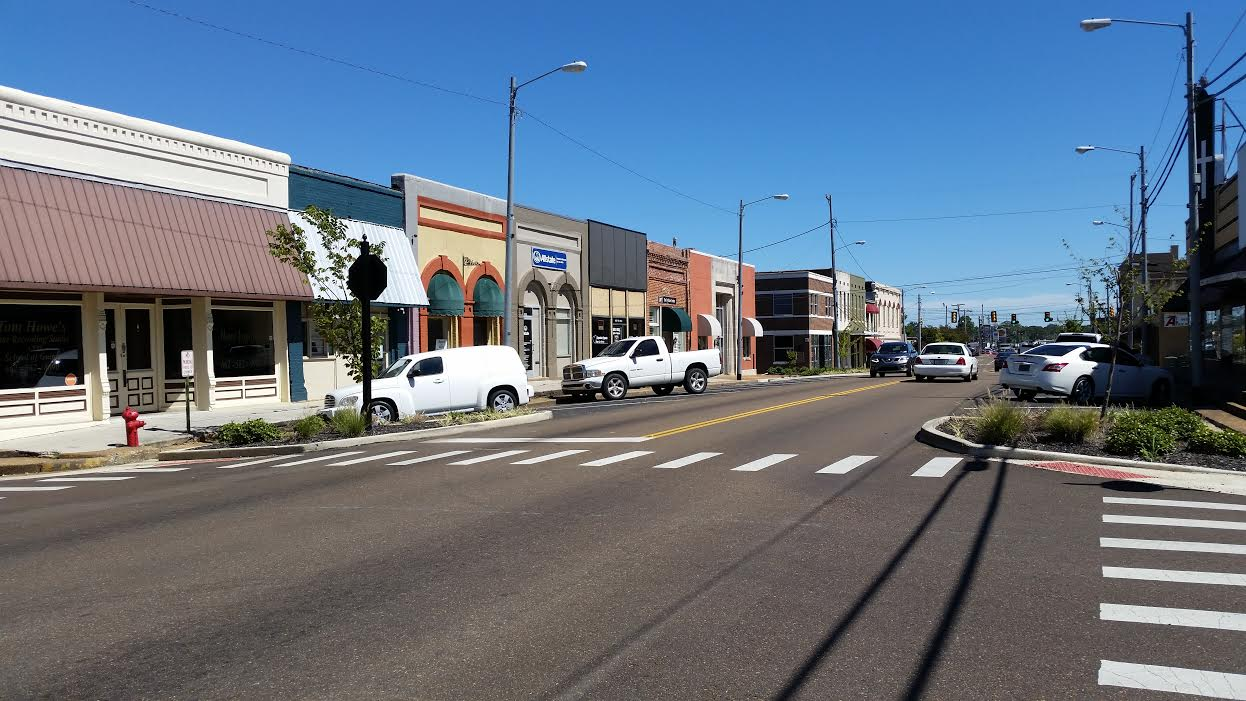
- Location: Roughly along N. and S. Center, N. and S. Front, W. Main, W. Tate, and N. and S. Ward Streets, Senatobia, Mississippi, U.S.
- Coordinates: 34.618611°N 89.965556°W
- Area: 7-acre (2.8 ha)
- Built: 1875–1949
- Architectural style: Italianate, Colonial Revival, and other
- NRHP reference No.: 94000205
- Added to NRHP: March 31, 1994

The Downtown Senatobia Historic District is a roughly 7-acre (2.8 ha) historic district in Senatobia, Mississippi, U.S.A. It is roughly bound by North and South Center Streets, North and South Front Streets, West Main Street, West Tate Street, and North and South Ward Streets. It is listed on the National Register of Historic Places since March 31, 1994.

The district includes most of the traditional central business district area in the city of Senatobia, and 61 principal buildings that make it up. The downtown developed in 1856 after the opening of the Mississippi and Tennessee Railroad. Senatobia became the county seat in 1873 for the newly formed county.

== See also ==
- National Register of Historic Places listings in Tate County, Mississippi
