= Lee House (Batesville, Mississippi) =

Historic house in Mississippi, United States

- U.S. National Register of Historic Places
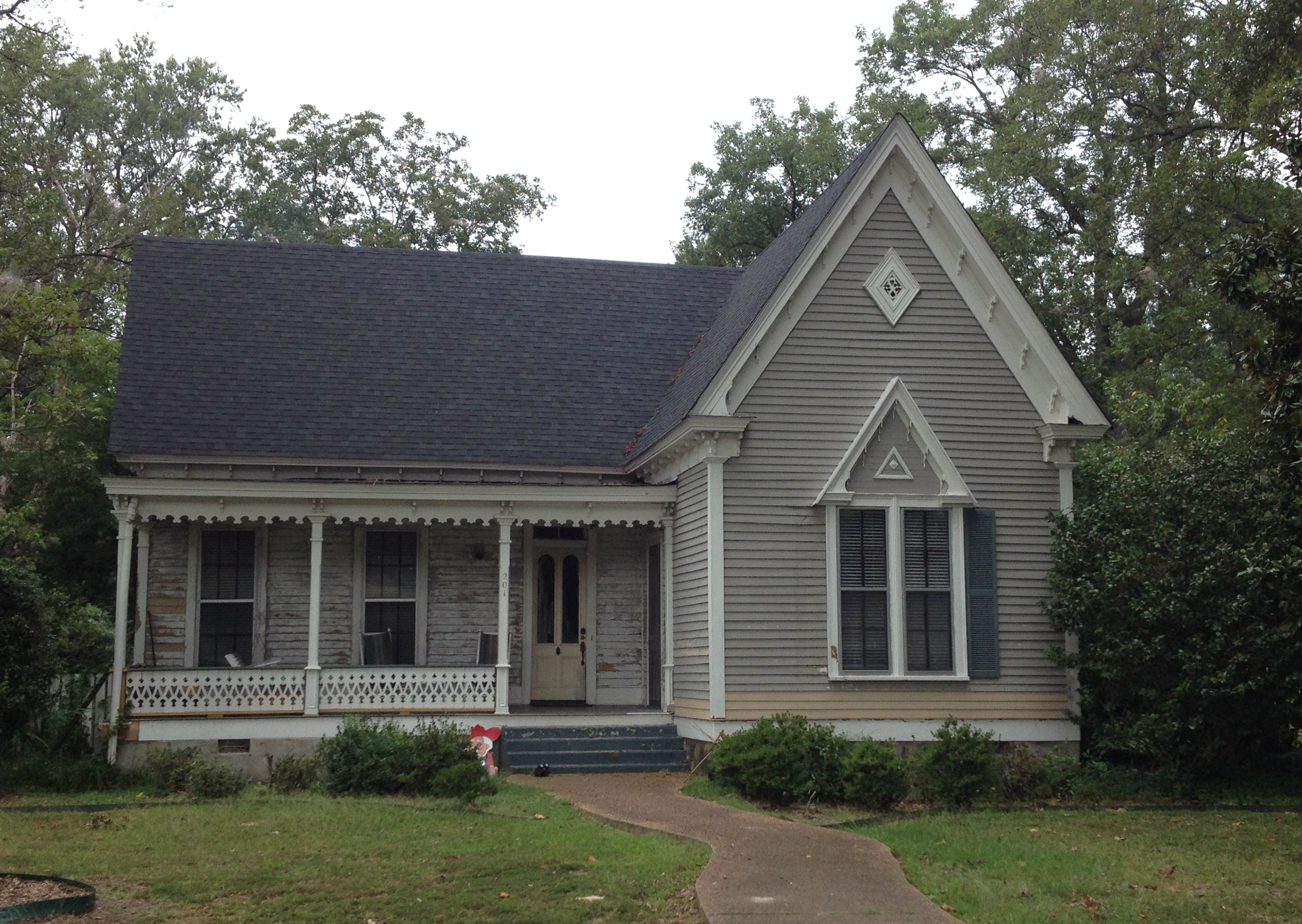

- Location within Mississippi Location within the United States
- Interactive map showing the location of Lee House
- Location: 201 Booth St., Batesville, Mississippi
- Coordinates: 34°18′46″N 89°57′27″W
- Built: 1888
- Architect: Johnson, Andrew
- Architectural style: L-shaped cottage
- MPS: Johnson, Andrew, Architecture in North Mississippi TR
- NRHP reference No.: 84002312
- Added to NRHP: April 9, 1984

Lee House in Batesville, Mississippi was built in 1888. It was listed on the National Register of Historic Places in 1984.

It was deemed significant as it is "the only Andrew Johnson residence in Batesville and is an excellent example of his ornamented L-shape cottage style."

It is a one-story ornamented cottage with a three-bay gallery with an intricate balustrade. It has irregular massing and fenestration, and a steep roof which is emphasized by a projecting pavilion. Paired and single brackets are used to support a cornice, and single brackets support the shallow eaves of the main roofline.
