= Sardis, Mississippi =

Town in the United States

- Town
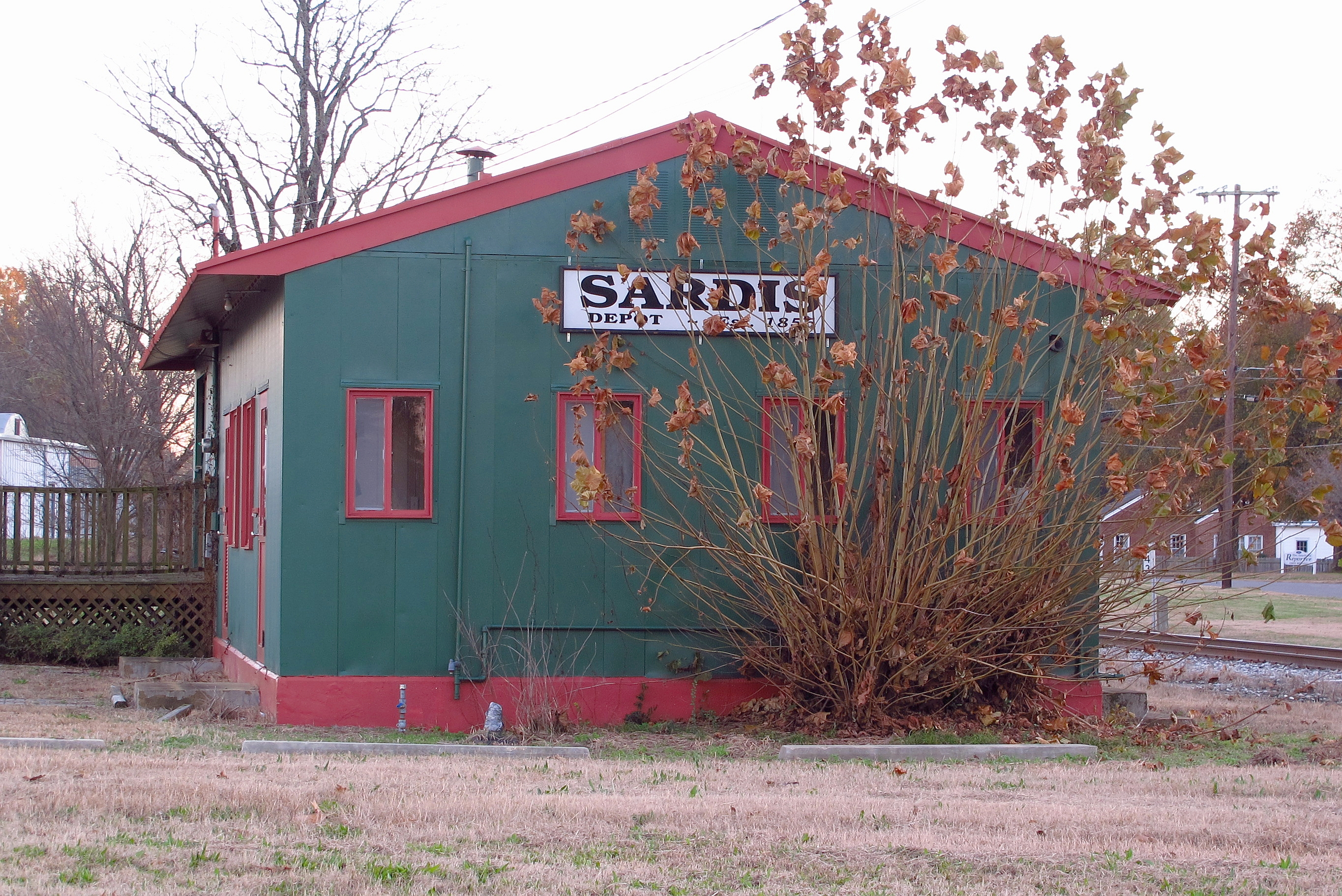
- Train depot in Sardis

- Location of Sardis, Mississippi

- Location within Mississippi Location within the United States
- Coordinates: 34°26′08″N 89°54′41″W
- Country: United States
- State: Mississippi
- County: Panola

Area
  - Total: 2.00 sq mi (5.18 km^{2})
  - Land: 2.00 sq mi (5.18 km^{2})
  - Water: 0 sq mi (0.00 km^{2})
- Elevation: 361 ft (110 m)

Population (2020)
  - Total: 1,748
  - Density: 874.3/sq mi (337.58/km^{2})
- Time zone: UTC-6 (Central (CST))
  - Summer (DST): UTC-5 (CDT)
- ZIP code: 38666
- Area code: 662
- FIPS code: 28-65560
- GNIS feature ID: 2407290
- Website: cityofsardisms.com

Sardis is a town in Panola County, Mississippi, United States. As of the 2020 census, the town population was 1,748. Sardis is one of two county seats for Panola County; the other is Batesville, on the south side of the Tallahatchie River.

== Geography ==
According to the United States Census Bureau, the town has a total area of 2.0 square miles (5.2 km^{2}), all land.

== Demographics ==
Historical population
Census	Pop.	Note	%±
1880	986		—
1890	1,044		5.9%
1900	1,002		−4.0%
1910	1,406		40.3%
1920	1,352		−3.8%
1930	1,298		−4.0%
1940	2,022		55.8%
1950	1,913		−5.4%
1960	2,098		9.7%
1970	2,391		14.0%
1980	2,278		−4.7%
1990	2,128		−6.6%
2000	2,038		−4.2%
2010	1,703		−16.4%
2020	1,748		2.6%
U.S. Decennial Census

=== Racial and ethnic composition ===
Sardis town, Mississippi – Racial and ethnic composition Note: the US Census treats Hispanic/Latino as an ethnic category. This table excludes Latinos from the racial categories and assigns them to a separate category. Hispanics/Latinos may be of any race.
Race / Ethnicity (NH = Non-Hispanic)	Pop 2000	Pop 2010	Pop 2020	% 2000	% 2010	% 2020
White alone (NH)	851	604	526	41.76%	35.47%	30.09%
Black or African American alone (NH)	1,141	1,060	1,155	55.99%	62.24%	66.08%
Native American or Alaska Native alone (NH)	1	5	2	0.05%	0.29%	0.11%
Asian alone (NH)	8	5	0	0.39%	0.29%	0.00%
Native Hawaiian or Pacific Islander alone (NH)	0	0	1	0.00%	0.00%	0.06%
Other race alone (NH)	0	1	7	0.00%	0.06%	0.40%
Mixed race or Multiracial (NH)	7	16	32	0.34%	0.94%	1.83%
Hispanic or Latino (any race)	30	12	25	1.47%	0.70%	1.43%
Total	2,038	1,703	1,748	100.00%	100.00%	100.00%

=== 2020 census ===
As of the 2020 census, Sardis had a population of 1,748. The median age was 42.3 years. 24.1% of residents were under the age of 18 and 21.8% of residents were 65 years of age or older. For every 100 females there were 89.0 males, and for every 100 females age 18 and over there were 86.2 males age 18 and over.

0.0% of residents lived in urban areas, while 100.0% lived in rural areas.

There were 701 households in Sardis, of which 30.2% had children under the age of 18 living in them. Of all households, 25.2% were married-couple households, 26.8% were households with a male householder and no spouse or partner present, and 41.5% were households with a female householder and no spouse or partner present. About 36.4% of all households were made up of individuals and 15.7% had someone living alone who was 65 years of age or older.

There were 778 housing units, of which 9.9% were vacant. The homeowner vacancy rate was 1.4% and the rental vacancy rate was 5.1%.

Racial composition as of the 2020 census
Race	Number	Percent
White	533	30.5%
Black or African American	1,162	66.5%
American Indian and Alaska Native	5	0.3%
Asian	0	0.0%
Native Hawaiian and Other Pacific Islander	1	0.1%
Some other race	13	0.7%
Two or more races	34	1.9%

=== 2000 census ===
As of the census of 2000, there were 2,038 people, 790 households, and 493 families residing in the town. The population density was 1,028.0 inhabitants per square mile (396.9/km^{2}). There were 862 housing units at an average density of 434.8 per square mile (167.9/km^{2}). The racial makeup of the town was 41.90% White, 56.43% African American, 0.05% Native American, 0.39% Asian, 0.54% from other races, and 0.69% from two or more races. Hispanic or Latino of any race were 1.47% of the population.

There were 790 households, out of which 25.1% had children under the age of 18 living with them, 36.1% were married couples living together, 23.2% had a female householder with no husband present, and 37.5% were non-families. 33.4% of all households were made up of individuals, and 18.6% had someone living alone who was 65 years of age or older. The average household size was 2.50 and the average family size was 3.24.

In the town, the population was spread out, with 26.1% under the age of 18, 9.2% from 18 to 24, 21.2% from 25 to 44, 22.3% from 45 to 64, and 21.2% who were 65 years of age or older. The median age was 39 years. For every 100 females, there were 77.5 males. For every 100 females age 18 and over, there were 72.1 males.

The median income for a household in the town was $23,042, and the median income for a family was $32,933. Males had a median income of $24,783 versus $18,750 for females. The per capita income for the town was $15,195. About 18.4% of families and 24.2% of the population were below the poverty line, including 32.2% of those under age 18 and 24.1% of those age 65 or over.

== Education ==
The Town of Sardis is served by the North Panola School District. North Panola Junior High School in Como and North Panola High School in Sardis serve the community. The Quitman County School District serves the portion of Crenshaw that lies in Quitman County.

== Notable people ==
- Sanders Bohlke, folk singer
- Cedric Burnett, member of the Mississippi House of Representatives
- Charles P. Hall − Lieutenant general of the United States Army, who served in both World Wars.
- KJ Jefferson − Former quarterback for the Arkansas Razorbacks football and UCF Knights football teams.
- Germany Kent − media personality. First person inducted into North Panola School District Hall of Fame.
- John C. Kyle − Democratic politician from the US state of Mississippi during the late 19th century.
- Nolan Mettetal − Mississippi state legislator
- Ronnie Musgrove − politician, 62nd Governor of Mississippi
- Josiah T. Settle, former member of the Mississippi House of Representatives
- Hubert Anthony Shands, author
