= Como, Mississippi =

- Town
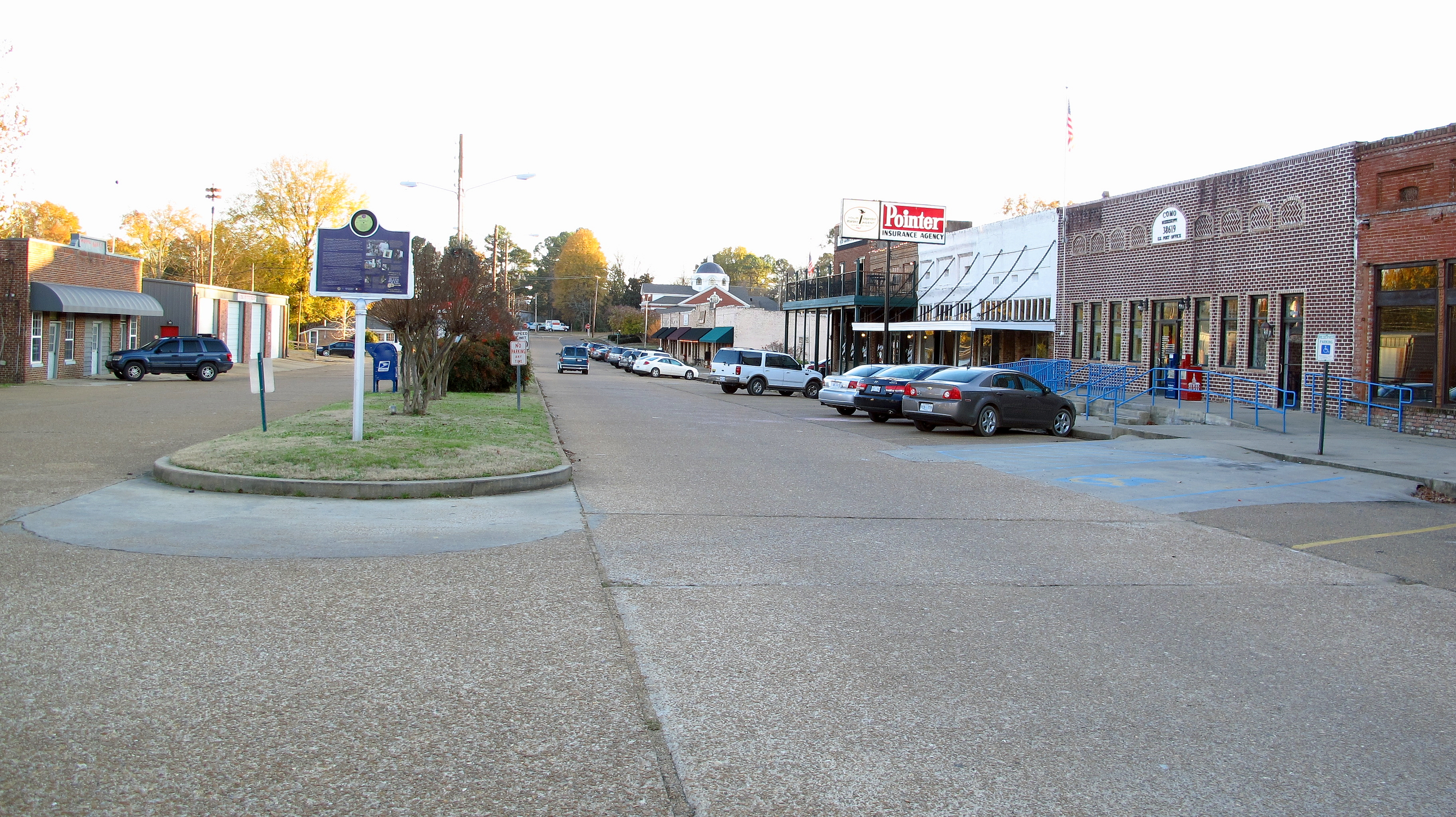
- Main Street in Como

- Location of Como, Mississippi

- Location within Mississippi Location within the United States
- Coordinates: 34°30′48″N 89°56′21″W
- Country: United States
- State: Mississippi
- County: Panola

Area
  - Total: 1.90 sq mi (4.92 km^{2})
  - Land: 1.89 sq mi (4.89 km^{2})
  - Water: 0.0077 sq mi (0.02 km^{2})
- Elevation: 364 ft (111 m)

Population (2020)
  - Total: 1,118
  - Density: 591.9/sq mi (228.53/km^{2})
- Time zone: UTC-6 (Central (CST))
  - Summer (DST): UTC-5 (CDT)
- ZIP code: 38619
- Area code: 662
- FIPS code: 28-15500
- GNIS feature ID: 2406302
- Website: townofcomo.municipalimpact.com

Como is a small resort town in Panola County, Mississippi, United States, which borders the Mississippi Delta and is in the northern part of the state, known as hill country. As of the 2020 census, Como had a population of 1,118. Its popular downtown scene is a lively hub of bars and restaurants, including the famous Como Steakhouse. The entire downtown is listed on the National Historic Register.

== History ==
Como is known for its rich blues history, with a number of blues artists hailing from the area, including Grammy-nominated musician RL Boyce.

== Geography ==
According to the United States Census Bureau, the town has a total area of 1.9 square miles (4.9 km^{2}), of which 1.9 square miles (4.9 km^{2}) is land and 0.53% is water.

It is 45 miles (72 km) south of Memphis, Tennessee.

== Demographics ==
Historical population
Census	Pop.	Note	%±
1880	149		—
1890	178		19.5%
1900	475		166.9%
1910	905		90.5%
1920	818		−9.6%
1930	851		4.0%
1940	819		−3.8%
1950	703		−14.2%
1960	789		12.2%
1970	1,003		27.1%
1980	1,378		37.4%
1990	1,387		0.7%
2000	1,310		−5.6%
2010	1,279		−2.4%
2020	1,118		−12.6%
U.S. Decennial Census

=== Racial and ethnic composition ===
Como town, Mississippi – Racial and ethnic composition Note: the US Census treats Hispanic/Latino as an ethnic category. This table excludes Latinos from the racial categories and assigns them to a separate category. Hispanics/Latinos may be of any race.
Race / Ethnicity (NH = Non-Hispanic)	Pop 2000	Pop 2010	Pop 2020	% 2000	% 2010	% 2020
White alone (NH)	346	340	306	26.41%	26.58%	27.37%
Black or African American alone (NH)	940	930	777	71.76%	72.71%	69.50%
Native American or Alaska Native alone (NH)	0	0	2	0.00%	0.00%	0.18%
Asian alone (NH)	0	0	3	0.00%	0.00%	0.27%
Native Hawaiian or Pacific Islander alone (NH)	0	0	0	0.00%	0.00%	0.00%
Other race alone (NH)	0	0	0	0.00%	0.00%	0.00%
Mixed race or Multiracial (NH)	9	6	21	0.69%	0.47%	1.88%
Hispanic or Latino (any race)	15	3	9	1.15%	0.23%	0.81%
Total	1,310	1,279	1,118	100.00%	100.00%	100.00%

=== 2020 census ===
As of the 2020 United States census, there were 1,118 people, 590 households, and 284 families residing in the town.

=== 2000 census ===
As of the census of 2000, there were 1,310 people, 461 households, and 352 families residing in the town. The population density was 692.1 inhabitants per square mile (267.2/km^{2}). There were 506 housing units at an average density of 267.3 per square mile (103.2/km^{2}). The racial makeup of the town was 71.83% African American, 26.79% White, 0.08% Native American, 0.61% from other races, and 0.69% from two or more races. Hispanic or Latino of any race were 1.15% of the population.

There were 461 households, out of which 34.5% had children under the age of 18 living with them, 39.7% were married couples living together, 31.0% had a female householder with no husband present, and 23.6% were non-families. 22.1% of all households were made up of individuals, and 11.9% had someone living alone who was 65 years of age or older. The average household size was 2.84 and the average family size was 3.30.

In the town, the population was spread out, with 30.1% under the age of 18, 9.8% from 18 to 24, 24.5% from 25 to 44, 20.6% from 45 to 64, and 15.0% who were 65 years of age or older. The median age was 34 years. For every 100 females, there were 81.2 males. For every 100 females age 18 and over, there were 74.8 males.

The median income for a household in the town was $22,344, and the median income for a family was $25,000. Males had a median income of $28,333 versus $18,977 for females. The per capita income for the town was $12,278. About 31.3% of families and 37.5% of the population were below the poverty line, including 57.2% of those under age 18 and 29.6% of those age 65 or over.

== Education ==
The Town of Como is served by the North Panola School District. Como Elementary School in Como, North Panola Junior High School in Como, and North Panola High School in Sardis serve the community.

== Infrastructure ==
The United States Postal Service operates the Como Post Office.

== Notable people ==
- R.L. Boyce (1955–2023), blues musician, was born lived and died in Como.
- Floyd Chance, double bass player and session musician
- Jessie Mae Hemphill (1923–2006), Hill Country blues musician
- Joe Henderson (1937–1964), R&B and gospel singer who was born in Como.
- Rosa Lee Hill, blues musician
- Albert R. Howe, member of the United States House of Representatives from 1873 to 1875
- Alvin Ray Jackson, professional football player
- Tony Johnson, former National Football League tight end
- Tommy Joe Martins (b. 1986), racecar driver, was born in Como.
- Jimbo Mathus (b. 1967), musician, has lived in Como since 2007.
- Mississippi Fred McDowell (1904–1972), Hill country blues musician
- L. H. Musgrove (1832–1868) was an outlaw born in Como and moved to the American West.
- Miriam Greene Paslay (1869–1932), professor of Latin and Greek at Mississippi Industrial Institute & College (1891–1920)
- Luther Perkins (1928–1968), guitarist who played for singer Johnny Cash
- Michael Shaheen (1940–2007), mayor of Como from 1970 to 1973.
- Napoleon Strickland (1919–2001), Hill country blues musician
- Othar Turner (1907–2003), Hill country blues musician
- Stark Young (1881–1963) novelist was born and grew up in Como.
