= Senatobia, Mississippi =

- City
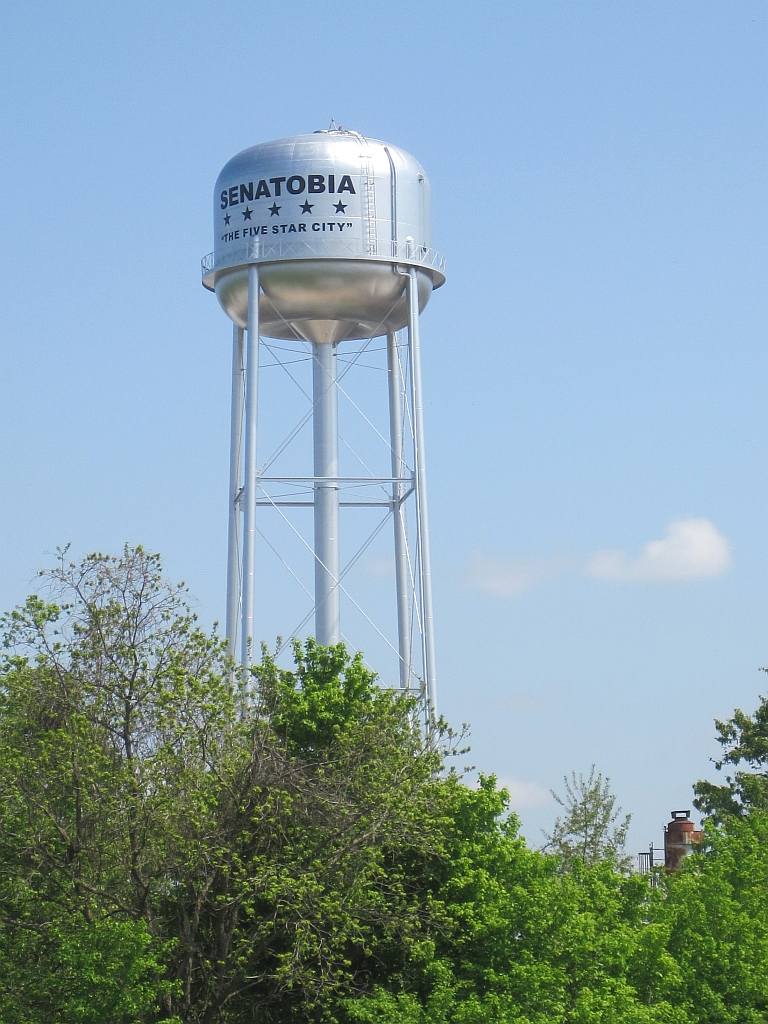
- Senatobia's water tower

- Flag Logo
- Motto: The Five Star City
- Location of Senatobia, Mississippi

- Location in the United States
- Coordinates: 34°36′59″N 89°59′10″W
- Country: United States
- State: Mississippi
- County: Tate
- Chartered: 1860

Government
  - Mayor: Greg Graves

Area
  - Total: 15.64 sq mi (40.51 km^{2})
  - Land: 15.56 sq mi (40.30 km^{2})
  - Water: 0.081 sq mi (0.21 km^{2})
- Elevation: 279 ft (85 m)

Population (2020)
  - Total: 8,354
  - Density: 537.0/sq mi (207.32/km^{2})
- Time zone: UTC-6 (Central (CST))
  - Summer (DST): UTC-5 (CDT)
- ZIP code: 38668
- Area code: 662
- FIPS code: 28-66440
- GNIS feature ID: 2405443
- Website: cityofsenatobiams.gov

Senatobia is a city in and the county seat of Tate County, Mississippi, United States; it is the 16th-largest municipality in the Memphis metropolitan area. As of the 2020 census, Senatobia had a population of 8,354. It is home to Northwest Mississippi Community College, a state community college providing two-year academic and technical degree programs. Also located in Senatobia is the Baddour Center, a residential-care facility for intellectually disabled adults.

== History ==
On April 13, 1834, early settler James Peters purchased two sections of land from the Chickasaw Nation for the price of $1.25 per acre. This land was later developed as the town of Senatobia. The community took its name from Senatobia Creek.

The Downtown Senatobia Historic District, the core of Senatobia's central business district, developed in 1856 after the opening of the Tennessee and Mississippi Railroad. Two nearby settlements, Tatumsville and Tatesville, were both abandoned, with those populations moving to Senatobia in favor of easier transportation.

Senatobia received its charter as a municipality in 1860. During the Civil War, the town's business section was burned twice by federal troops. Tate County was organized in 1873, during the Reconstruction era, with Senatobia becoming the county seat in 1873 for the newly formed county.

In June 2026, a one-year-old child, Kohen Wiley, was shot dead by a police officer firing at a fleeing car at a Walmart in Senatobia. In September, the police chief was fired by the city's board of alderman after revelations that he had used racial slurs in text conversations with a colleague.

== Geography ==
According to the United States Census Bureau, the city has a total area of 10.8 square miles (28 km^{2}), of which 0.04 sq mi (0.10 km^{2}) (0.28%) is covered by water.

=== Climate ===
Climate data for Senatobia, Mississippi (1991–2020)
Month	Jan	Feb	Mar	Apr	May	Jun	Jul	Aug	Sep	Oct	Nov	Dec	Year
Mean daily maximum °F (°C)	51.6 (10.9)	55.1 (12.8)	64.1 (17.8)	73.4 (23.0)	81.0 (27.2)	88.9 (31.6)	91.3 (32.9)	91.6 (33.1)	85.9 (29.9)	75.2 (24.0)	63.6 (17.6)	53.6 (12.0)	72.9 (22.7)
Daily mean °F (°C)	41.2 (5.1)	44.5 (6.9)	53.1 (11.7)	62.1 (16.7)	70.5 (21.4)	78.1 (25.6)	81.3 (27.4)	80.6 (27.0)	74.1 (23.4)	62.3 (16.8)	51.9 (11.1)	43.5 (6.4)	61.9 (16.6)
Mean daily minimum °F (°C)	30.8 (−0.7)	34.0 (1.1)	42.0 (5.6)	50.8 (10.4)	60.0 (15.6)	67.4 (19.7)	71.2 (21.8)	69.7 (20.9)	62.4 (16.9)	49.5 (9.7)	40.1 (4.5)	33.4 (0.8)	50.9 (10.5)
Average precipitation inches (mm)	4.67 (119)	4.99 (127)	5.51 (140)	6.05 (154)	5.85 (149)	4.75 (121)	4.86 (123)	3.49 (89)	3.14 (80)	4.55 (116)	4.15 (105)	5.88 (149)	57.89 (1,472)
Average snowfall inches (cm)	0.1 (0.25)	0.2 (0.51)	0.0 (0.0)	0.0 (0.0)	0.0 (0.0)	0.0 (0.0)	0.0 (0.0)	0.0 (0.0)	0.0 (0.0)	0.0 (0.0)	0.0 (0.0)	0.1 (0.25)	0.4 (1.01)
Source: NOAA

== Demographics ==
Historical population
Census	Pop.	Note	%±
1880	935		—
1890	1,077		15.2%
1900	1,156		7.3%
1910	1,275		10.3%
1920	1,126		−11.7%
1930	1,264		12.3%
1940	1,757		39.0%
1950	2,108		20.0%
1960	3,259		54.6%
1970	4,247		30.3%
1980	5,013		18.0%
1990	4,772		−4.8%
2000	6,682		40.0%
2010	8,165		22.2%
2020	8,354		2.3%
U.S. Decennial Census

=== Racial and ethnic composition ===
Senatobia city, Mississippi – Racial and ethnic composition Note: the US Census treats Hispanic/Latino as an ethnic category. This table excludes Latinos from the racial categories and assigns them to a separate category. Hispanics/Latinos may be of any race.
Race / Ethnicity (NH = Non-Hispanic)	Pop 2000	Pop 2010	Pop 2020	% 2000	% 2010	% 2020
White alone (NH)	4,513	4,989	4,467	67.54%	61.10%	53.47%
Black or African American alone (NH)	2,035	2,855	3,367	30.45%	34.97%	40.30%
Native American or Alaska Native alone (NH)	6	16	10	0.09%	0.20%	0.12%
Asian alone (NH)	13	24	31	0.19%	0.29%	0.37%
Native Hawaiian or Pacific Islander alone (NH)	10	1	0	0.15%	0.01%	0.00%
Other race alone (NH)	5	7	40	0.07%	0.09%	0.48%
Mixed race or Multiracial (NH)	43	81	215	0.64%	0.99%	2.57%
Hispanic or Latino (any race)	57	192	224	0.85%	2.35%	2.68%
Total	6,682	8,165	8,354	100.00%	100.00%	100.00%

=== 2020 census ===
As of the 2020 census, Senatobia had a population of 8,354. The median age was 29.8 years; 23.4% of residents were under 18 and 13.3% were 65 or older. For every 100 females, there were 91.5 males, and for every 100 females 18 and over, there were 89.6 males 18 and over.

About 81.6% of residents lived in urban areas, while 18.4% lived in rural areas.

Of the 2,692 households in Senatobia, 37.2% had children under 18 living in them, 38.7% were married-couple households, 16.4% were households with a male householder and no spouse or partner present, and 39.2% were households with a female householder and no spouse or partner present. About 27.7% of all households were made up of individuals, and 12.3% had someone living alone who was 65 or older.

The city had 2,880 housing units, of which 6.5% were vacant. The homeowner vacancy rate was 0.8% and the rental vacancy rate was 9.0%.

=== 2010 census ===
As of the census of 2010, 8,165 people, 2,554 households, and 1,826 families resided in the city. The population density was 621.7 inhabitants per square mile (240.0/km^{2}). The 2,239 housing units had an average density of 208.3 per square mile (80.4/km^{2}). The racial makeup of the city was 61.1% White, 35.0% African American, 2.4% Hispanic or Latino of any race, and 1.6% in other racial or ethnic categories.

=== 2000 census ===
As of the 2000 census, 6,682 people, 2,137 households, and 1,498 families resided in the city. The racial makeup was 68.03% White, 30.51% African American, 0.12% Native American, 0.22% Asian, 0.15% Pacific Islander, 0.24% from other races, and 0.72% from two or more races. Hispanics or Latinos of any race were 0.85% of the population.

Of the 2,137 households, 38.3% had children under 18 living with them, 47.4% were married couples living together, 19.4% had a female householder with no husband present, and 29.9% were not families. About 26.6% of all households were made up of individuals, and 12.5% had someone living alone who was 65 or older. The average household size was 2.60, and the average family size was 3.15.

In the city, the age distribution was 24.8% under 18, 20.1% from 18 to 24, 26.0% from 25 to 44, 17.1% from 45 to 64, and 11.9% who were 65 or older. The median age was 29 years. For every 100 females, there were 89.1 males. For every 100 females 18 and over, there were 85.4 males.

The median income in the city for a household was $33,698 and for a family was $43,088. Males had a median income of $34,022 versus $22,000 for females. The per capita income for the city was $16,434. About 13.0% of families and 17.7% of the population were below the poverty line, including 21.3% of those under 18 and 18.5% of those 65 or over.

== Education ==
All of Senatobia is within the Senatobia Municipal School District.

The city has a private school, Magnolia Heights School.

== Notable people ==
- JoJo Billingsley (1952–2010), rock-and-roll vocalist
- Aron Burton (1938–2016), blues bass guitarist
- William J. East (1854–1933), Mississippi state legislator, mayor of Senatobia (1887–1888)
- Steve Hale (born 1954), Mississippi state senator, mayor of Senatobia (1993–2001)
- James "Kamala" Harris (1950–2020), wrestler
- Sid Hemphill (1876-1963), bandleader
- Robert Earl Jones (1910–2006), an American actor, with conflicted stories about his hometown
- O. B. McClinton (1940–1987), country and rhythm-and-blues singer/songwriter
- Jacob Buehler Snider (1886–1966), 23rd lieutenant governor of Mississippi, mayor of Senatobia (1925–1928)
- Dan A. Sullivan, member of the Arkansas House of Representatives from Jonesboro, Arkansas
- Elise Varner Winter (1926–2021), former first lady of Mississippi
