= Chulahoma: The Songs of Junior Kimbrough =

Chulahoma

EP by The Black Keys
- Released: May 2, 2006
- Recorded: July 2005
- Genre: Blues rock; hill country blues
- Length: 27:39
- Label: Fat Possum
- Producer: The Black Keys

The Black Keys chronology
Rubber Factory (2004)	Chulahoma (2006)	Live in Austin, TX (2006)

Professional ratings
Review scores
Source	Rating
AllMusic	3.5/5 stars
Uncut	4.5/5 stars

Chulahoma: The Songs of Junior Kimbrough is an EP by American rock duo the Black Keys. Essentially a tribute album, it is a collection of the band's cover versions of songs by Fat Possum Records bluesman Junior Kimbrough, who died in 1998. The title is a Choctaw word for red fox and is a reference to Chulahoma, Mississippi, location of "Junior's Place", a juke joint bought by Kimbrough around 1992 and operated after his death by his sons until it burned down on April 6, 2000.

The Black Keys had already covered Kimbrough on their 2002 debut album, with "Do the Rump", and on their second record Thickfreakness, with "Everywhere I Go". In 2005, they contributed a "My Mind is Ramblin'" cover to the Sunday Nights: The Songs of Junior Kimbrough tribute compilation, which also features Iggy Pop & the Stooges and Spiritualized. A different rendition of "My Mind Is Ramblin'" appears on Chulahoma. Chulahoma was recorded in the basement of 54 Metlin Rd in Akron, Ohio, and was the band's last record with Fat Possum Records, as they subsequently signed to Nonesuch Records.

The CD of the album includes a letter from Dan Auerbach in which he describes his first encounter with Kimbrough's music and how it inspired him to drop out of college and become a musician. In the letter, Auerbach expressed a wish to meet Kimbrough one day, but Kimbrough died before Auerbach had the opportunity. The album includes a seventh track, a 33-second phone message from Kimbrough's widow, in which she thanks the band for creating the EP, adding that the Black Keys are the only band that "really plays like Junior", and that she felt very proud that her husband had inspired them.

== Track listing ==
All tracks are written by Junior Kimbrough.

No.	Title	Length
1.	"Keep Your Hands Off Her"	3:06
2.	"Have Mercy on Me"	4:42
3.	"Work Me"	4:15
4.	"Meet Me in the City"	3:38
5.	"Nobody but You"	5:21
6.	"My Mind Is Ramblin'"	6:45
7.	"Junior's Widow"	0:32

Bonus track
No.	Title	Length
8.	"Junior's Instrumental"	2:24

== Personnel ==
- Dan Auerbach – vocals, electric guitar, bass, slide guitar, organ, baritone guitar
- Patrick Carney – drums & percussion
