= God Knows I Tried =

Studio album by Junior Kimbrough
- Released: 1998
- Genre: Blues
- Label: Fat Possum/Epitaph

Junior Kimbrough chronology
Most Things Haven't Worked Out (1997)	God Knows I Tried (1998)	Meet Me in the City (1999)

God Knows I Tried is an album by the American blues musician Junior Kimbrough, released in 1998. It was his first posthumous album. Buddy Guy covered "I Gotta Try You Girl" on his Sweet Tea album.

== Production ==
The album includes tracks that were left off Kimbrough's three Fat Possum albums, and were recorded between 1992 and 1997. A few songs were recorded at Kimbrough's juke joint in Chulahoma, Mississippi. Kimbrough first recorded "Tramp" in 1968, as a single for Philwood Records.

== Critical reception ==
Professional ratings
Review scores
Source	Rating
AllMusic	3/5 stars
The Commercial Appeal	4/4 stars
The Encyclopedia of Popular Music	4/5 stars
The Penguin Guide to Blues Recordings	2.5/4 stars

The Plain Dealer wrote that "the music here is powerful and, on 'Tramp' and the slashing instrumental 'All Night Long', moving ... The urgency with which Kimbrough plays is undeniable, but how much thought he gave to the shape of these tunes is a question that likely will go unanswered." Miami New Times called Kimbrough "an undisputed master," writing that he "sounded primitive and modern all at the same time."

AllMusic wrote: "Kimbrough single-handedly invented his own blues style, a mixture of hard-edged instrumentation, conversational, ghost-touched vocals, and, unique to the North Mississippi hill country, the looping, hypnotic guitar riffs which he plays through mild, fluid distortion, giving the whole a pulsing, dream-like quality." The Chicago Sun-Times deemed the album one of 1998's 10 best blues releases.

== Track listing ==
No.	Title	Length
1.	"You're Gonna Find Your Mistake"
2.	"How Do You Feel"
3.	"I Gotta Try You Girl"
4.	"I'm in Love with You"
5.	"I Cried Last Night"
6.	"Keep on Braggin'"
7.	"Tramp"
8.	"All Night Long (Instrumental)"
