= Belfour =

Belfour is an English surname. It can alternatively be spelled as Belfor.

Notable people with the name include:

- Ed Belfour (born 1965), Canadian ice hockey goaltender
- Hugo John Belfour (1802–1827), English poet and cleric
- John Belfour (1768–1842), English orientalist and writer
- Robert Belfour (1940–2015), American blues musician
