= What's Wrong with You =

Studio album by Robert Belfour
- Released: 2000
- Studio: Money Shot
- Genre: Blues
- Label: Fat Possum
- Producers: Matthew Johnson, Bruce Watson

Robert Belfour chronology
The Spirit Lives On (1994)	What's Wrong with You (2000)	Pushin' My Luck (2003)

What's Wrong with You is an album by the American musician Robert Belfour, released in 2000. He was 60 when the album was released. Belfour supported the album by participating in the Fat Possum Juke Joint Caravan tour.

== Production ==
Belfour signed with Fat Possum after a fan spent years asking if Belfour's phone number could be relayed to the label. "Black Mattie" and "Done Got Old" were written by Junior Kimbrough, Belfour's former neighbor. Belfour used a drummer on only two tracks.

== Critical reception ==
Professional ratings
Review scores
Source	Rating
AllMusic	4/5 stars
The Commercial Appeal	3.5/5 stars
The Penguin Guide to Blues Recordings	4/4 stars
The Philadelphia Inquirer	3.5/4 stars
Winnipeg Sun	4/4 stars

Billboard wrote that Belfour's "insistent, fluid guitar work and keening singing may remind the listener of John Lee Hooker at times, but his strong, original songs ... and a hypnotic style that betrays his North Mississippi roots, establish him firmly in a class by himself." The Winston-Salem Journal determined that "it is impossible not to hear John Lee Hooker, Fred McDowell and Charlie Patton in Belfour's vocal phrasing and his delightfully eclectic guitar playing." The Commercial Appeal called the album "a tour-de-force of startling fortitude and timeless character that will have you envisioning Belfour contemporaries R. L. Burnside and the late Junior Kimbrough."

The Village Voice stated that, "with a voice cracking with the rage of the oppressed and cuckolded, 60-yearold Belfour is a silent sufferer who'd rather wallow than fight." The Chicago Tribune noted that, "even as fickle characters deceive, confuse and betray him, the singer maintains a melancholy dignity, his stoic voice exuding compassion even as the world he knows collapses around him." The News-Gazette deemed What's Wrong with You "easily one of finest pure Mississippi blues albums to emerge in years, if not decades." Knight Ridder considered it the second best blues album of 2000.

== Track listing ==
No.	Title	Length
1.	"My Baby's Gone"
2.	"Black Mattie"
3.	"What's Wrong with You"
4.	"Done Got Old"
5.	"Treat Me Right"
6.	"Walkin' the Floor"
7.	"Norene"
8.	"Holding My Pillow"
9.	"Bad Luck"
