= Meet Me in the City =

Meet Me in the City may refer to:

- "Meet Me in the City", a song by Bruce Springsteen on his 2015 album The Ties That Bind: The River Collection
- "Meet Me in the City", a song by Gomez on their 2004 album Split the Difference
- "Meet Me in the City", a song by Junior Kimbrough on his 1992 album All Night Long
