= Live in Austin, TX (The Black Keys album) =

Live album (official bootleg) by The Black Keys
- Released: May 5, 2006
- Recorded: October 24, 2003
- Genres: Garage rock; blues rock
- Length: 48:17
- Label: Jumper Productions
- Producers: Sal Ortiz-Steels; Adam Agardy; Christopher Tolle

The Black Keys chronology
Chulahoma: The Songs of Junior Kimbrough (2006)	Live in Austin, TX (2006)	Magic Potion (2006)

Live In Austin, TX is the first live album by American rock duo The Black Keys. It was published as an electronic for podcast by Austin, Texas based Jumper Productions. This is derived from the 10,000 piece limited Thickfreakness In Austin music DVD-video released by the same company on September 7, 2004. Unlike the edited version available on the DVD, this audio version is full-length. The concert was recorded on October 24, 2003 at Austin's Emo's as part of the Thickfreakness U.S. tour. Near the end of "Them Eyes" a young woman from the audience suddenly climbed on stage and started to dance near the performers. Quickly after the song's ending, guitarist Dan Auerbach switched roles from guitarist to lighthearted bouncer; he asked her off the stage with a quip "Hey girl, you play bass? What's up?".

== Track listing ==
No.	Title	Length
1.	"Hard Row"	3:36
2.	"Thickfreakness"	3:38
3.	"Busted"	3:10
4.	"Them Eyes"	3:20
5.	"The Breaks"	3:39
6.	"Set You Free"	3:02
7.	"Do the Rump"	4:02
8.	"I'll Be Your Man"	4:02
9.	"Have Love Will Travel"	3:17
10.	"No Trust"	3:42
11.	"No Fun (The Stooges cover)"	3:44
12.	"Everywhere I Go" (Encore)	4:56
13.	"Heavy Soul" (Encore)	4:16

== Personnel ==
- Dan Auerbach: guitar, vocals
- Patrick Carney: drums

== Production ==
- Sal Ortiz-Steels: producer
- Adam Agardy: Director of Photography
