= Chulahoma =

Chulahoma may refer to:

- the town of Chulahoma, Mississippi
- Chulahoma: The Songs of Junior Kimbrough, an EP by The Black Keys
