= Live in Austin, TX =

Live in Austin, TX may refer to:

- Live in Austin, TX (The Black Keys album)
- Live in Austin, TX (ProjeKct Three album)
