= 'Till I Get My Way / Girl Is on My Mind =

"'Till I Get My Way/Girl Is on My Mind"

Single by The Black Keys

from the album Rubber Factory
- Released: November 22, 2004
- Recorded: Akron, Ohio
- Genre: Garage rock, blues rock
- Length: 5:59
- Label: Fat Possum Records, Epitaph Records
- Songwriters: Dan Auerbach, Patrick Carney
- Producer: The Black Keys

The Black Keys singles chronology
"10 A.M. Automatic" (2004)	"'Till I Get My Way" / "Girl Is on My Mind" (2004)	"Your Touch" (2006)

"'Till I Get My Way/Girl Is on My Mind" is a double A-side single by American rock band The Black Keys. It features the songs "'Till I Get My Way" and "Girl Is on My Mind" from their third studio album Rubber Factory. It was released on November 22, 2004. "Girl Is on My Mind" was written by the group after the members repeatedly listened to the song "Shot Down" by fellow garage rock band The Sonics.

In December 2004, the singles "Till I Get My Way/Is on My Mind" peaked at No. 62 in UK Charts.

== Critical reception ==
Corey Irwin of Ultimate Classic Rock chose "Girl Is on My Mind" as the best song from the album Rubber Factory. Irwin felt that, "like the best Black Keys", the song "could have been released 40 years prior to its recording", comparing it to the music of Jimi Hendrix and The Doors. Complex Magazine considered it to be the 11th best song by the Black Keys, and writing that it was inspired by The Sonics track called "Shot Down".

The editor for Grammy website deemed it as a raw song with "sexy crawl, controlled-demolition drums, an abundant lo-fi buzz".

== Cultural references ==
"Girl Is on My Mind" was used in a Sony Ericsson advertisement, which starred tennis players Ana Ivanovic and Daniela Hantuchová. The commercial helped make the band more well-known. A commercial for Victoria's Secret also featured "Girl Is On My Mind". The 2006 British film Cashback and the Australian Not Suitable for Children both feature "Girl is On My Mind".

== Track listing ==
All songs were written by Dan Auerbach and Patrick Carney.

1. "'Till I Get My Way" (2:31)
2. "Girl Is on My Mind" (3:28)
3. "Flash of Silver" (previously unreleased)

== Personnel ==
- Dan Auerbach – guitars, vocals
- Patrick Carney – drums

== Charts ==
Chart (2004)	Peak position
UK Singles Chart	62
