= Sad Days, Lonely Nights =

- Digital and vinyl cover

Live album by Junior Kimbrough
- Released: 1994
- Recorded: April 1993
- Genre: Blues
- Length: 65:30
- Label: Fat Possum

Junior Kimbrough chronology
All Night Long (1992)	Sad Days, Lonely Nights (1994)	Do the Rump (1997)

Professional ratings
Review scores
Source	Rating
AllMusic	4/5 stars
The Penguin Guide to Blues Recordings	4/4 stars

Sad Days, Lonely Nights is an album by Junior Kimbrough, released in 1994. It was recorded live in Kimbrough's club, without an audience.

== Track listing ==
1. "Sad Days, Lonely Nights" – 4:22
2. "Lonesome in My Home" – 4:34
3. "Lord, Have Mercy on Me" – 9:54
4. "Crawling King Snake" – 4:50
5. "My Mind Is Rambling" – 6:21
6. "Leaving in the Morning" – 7:19 (HBO series Boardwalk Empire song for lead and trail)
7. "Old Black Mattie" – 6:40
8. "I'm in Love" – 5:04
9. "Pull Your Clothes Off" – 4:28
10. "I'm Gonna Have to Leave Here" – 6:35
11. "Sad Days, Lonely Nights" – 5:33
