= Popular Manipulations =

Studio album by The Districts
- Released: August 11, 2017
- Length: 38:17
- Label: Fat Possum
- Producer: John Congleton

The Districts chronology
A Flourish and a Spoil (2015)	Popular Manipulations (2017)	You Know I'm Not Going Anywhere (2020)

Professional ratings
Aggregate scores
Source	Rating
AnyDecentMusic?	7.1/10
Metacritic	76/100
Review scores
Source	Rating
AllMusic	4/5 stars

Popular Manipulations is the third studio album by American band The Districts. It was released in August 2017 under Fat Possum Records. It was recorded partially by Keith Abrams at Headroom Studios in Philadelphia and by John Congleton.

== Track listing ==
No.	Title	Length
1.	"If Before I Wake"	2:56
2.	"Violet"	4:10
3.	"Ordinary Day"	4:44
4.	"Salt"	4:05
5.	"Why Would I Wanna Be"	2:26
6.	"Point"	2:53
7.	"Airplane"	3:43
8.	"Fat Kiddo"	2:47
9.	"Capable"	3:10
10.	"Rattling of the Heart"	4:10
11.	"Will You Please Be Quiet, Please?"	3:13

== Charts ==
Chart (2017)	Peak position
US Heatseekers Albums (Billboard)	10
US Independent Albums (Billboard)	20
US Vinyl Albums (Billboard)	16
