= Most Things Haven't Worked Out =

Studio album by Junior Kimbrough
- Released: 1997
- Genre: Blues
- Label: Fat Possum
- Producer: Bruce Watson, Matthew Johnson

Junior Kimbrough chronology
Do the Rump! (1997)	Most Things Haven't Worked Out (1997)	God Knows I Tried (1998)

Most Things Haven't Worked Out is an album by the American musician Junior Kimbrough, released in 1997. It was his third album for Fat Possum Records and the last before his 1998 death.

== Production ==
All of the album's songs were written by Kimbrough, who generally did not cover the material of other musicians. He elected to keep his mistakes and missed notes on the tracks. Three of the tracks were recorded at his Mississippi juke joint. John Hermann helped produce a few of the songs. Kenny Brown served as the second guitarist. The title track is an instrumental.

== Critical reception ==
Professional ratings
Review scores
Source	Rating
AllMusic	4/5 stars
Boston Herald	3.5/4 stars
Robert Christgau	(1-star Honorable Mention)
The Commercial Appeal	3.5/4 stars
DownBeat	4/5 stars
MusicHound Blues: The Essential Album Guide	3.5/5 stars
The Penguin Guide to Blues Recordings	4/4 stars
Winnipeg Sun	3.5/5 stars

The Village Voice wrote: "Lurking beneath an ostensibly primitive surface are suggestions of jazz-inflected bluesmen like Robert Jr. Lockwood." Guitar Player determined that "there's a deeply hypnotic quality to Junior Kimbrough's old-as-all-of-time slow blues, perfected over a lifetime of playing jukes around Holly Springs, Mississippi." The St. Louis Post-Dispatch said that "Kimbrough plays the blues to mesmerize, with elements that give trance, ambient/techno and dub its entrainment and rock and roll its visceral claw and kick."

The Washington Post noted that "Kimbrough has a soft spot for love songs and slowly grinding dance grooves." The Boston Herald concluded that "what sounds primitive at first gains unexpected power through repetition and deceptively sophisticated shifts of texture, tone and rhythm." Robert Christgau praised "Lonesome Road".

The Penguin Guide to Blues Recordings considered Most Things Haven't Worked Out to be Kimbrough's best album.

== Track listing ==
No.	Title	Length
1.	"Lonesome Road"
2.	"I'm in Love"
3.	"Everywhere I Go"
4.	"Burn in Hell"
5.	"Most Things Haven't Worked Out"
6.	"Leave Her Alone"
7.	"I Love Ya Baby"
8.	"I'm Leaving You Baby"
