= 10 A.M. Automatic =

Single by the Black Keys

from the album Rubber Factory
- Released: August 30, 2004
- Recorded: Akron, Ohio
- Genre: Garage rock, blues rock
- Length: 2:59
- Label: Epitaph Records, Fat Possum Records
- Songwriters: Dan Auerbach, Patrick Carney
- Producer: The Black Keys

The Black Keys singles chronology
"Have Love Will Travel" (2003)	"10 A.M. Automatic" (2004)	"'Till I Get My Way/Girl Is On My Mind" (2004)

"10 A.M. Automatic" is a single by the Black Keys. It is from their album Rubber Factory and was released in 2004.

== Track listing ==
All songs written by Dan Auerbach and Patrick Carney, unless noted otherwise.

7"
A "10 A.M. Automatic"
B "Summertime Blues" (Eddie Cochran)

CD

1. "10 A.M. Automatic"
2. "Stack Shot Billy"
3. "Summertime Blues" (Eddie Cochran)

== Cultural references ==
"10 A.M. Automatic" was used in the video game MLB 06: The Show, as well as in American television series The O.C.. The Go-Getter, a 2007 comedy film, used the song, along with "Keep Me", also from Rubber Factory. The film Live Free or Die also used the song and an American Express commercial, featuring snowboarder/skateboarder Shaun White featured the song. It is also featured in the show The D-List with Dan Needles and Drew Olson on 540 ESPN Radio in Milwaukee.

== Music video ==
The music video for "10 A.M. Automatic" begins with a rabbi (played by Jon Glaser) on a chair preaching to an elderly audience. Suddenly, The Black Keys walk in from a side entrance. The man stops talking and the band begin to play. During their performance, the audience looks largely unappreciative, and an old woman stands up and walks to Dan Auerbach, only to be handled by security guards. When the band finishes playing their song, an awkward silence for more than ten seconds occurs, then he picks up the book and continues reading. The video was directed by David Cross. Paste Magazine ranked it number 24 on their list of the 50 Best Music Videos of the Decade 2000–2009).

== Chart performance ==
Chart (2007)	Peak position
UK Singles Chart	66
