= Bigger and Blackerer =

2010 comedy album and DVD by David Cross

Live album by David Cross
- Released: May 25, 2010
- Genre: Stand-up comedy
- Length: 1:02:35
- Label: Sub Pop

David Cross chronology
It's Not Funny (2004)	Bigger and Blackerer (2010)	...America...Great... (2016)

Professional ratings
Review scores
Source	Rating
Allmusic	link
Pitchfork Media	(5.6/10)
The A.V. Club	B+

Bigger and Blackerer is a 2010 album and DVD by American stand-up comedian David Cross. The album's title plays on Chris Rock's comedy album, Bigger & Blacker, and the cover plays off of the popular art form of painting on black velvet, such as Velvet Elvis (and is reminiscent of the Ray Charles album Ray Charles Greatest Hits). Cross taped and recorded the album during two shows at the Wilbur Theatre in Boston.

== Track listing ==
Bigger and Blackerer does not follow the non-sequitur track titling of Cross' previous albums, Shut Up You Fucking Baby! and It's Not Funny.

1. "Opening Song (The Sultan's Revenge)" – 4:18
2. "If You Care" – 1:44
3. "That One Show About Drugs And Stuff" – 6:13
4. "Me And Drugs" – 8:29
5. "Black Stuff" – 2:48
6. "...Or Worse" – 4:41
7. "Where We Are Now Back In Sept. '09" – 9:06
8. "Silly Religious Crazies" – 5:59
9. "Really Silly Religious Crazies. I Mean, Double, Triple Crazy!!" – 3:40
10. "Random Goofabouts" – 9:07
11. "I Can't Get Beer In Me..." – 2:40
12. "Lesson Learned" – 3:50

== Reception ==
The A.V. Club gave the album a B+. Pitchfork Media gave the album a 5.6.
