= You Know I'm Not Going Anywhere =

Studio album by The Districts
- Released: March 13, 2020
- Length: 43:55
- Label: Fat Possum Records

The Districts chronology
Popular Manipulations (2017)	You Know I'm Not Going Anywhere (2020)

Singles from You Know I'm Not Going Anywhere
- 1. "Cheap Regrets" Released: March 6, 2020

Professional ratings
Aggregate scores
Source	Rating
Metacritic	73/100
Review scores
Source	Rating
AllMusic	3.5/5 stars
DIY	3.5/5 stars
Exclaim!	7/10
The Line of Best Fit	8/10
MusicOMH	4/5 stars
NME	4/5 stars

You Know I'm Not Going Anywhere is the fourth studio album by American band The Districts. It was released on March 13, 2020 under Fat Possum Records.

== Critical reception ==
You Know I'm Not Going Anywhere was met with generally favorable reviews from critics. At Metacritic, which assigns a weighted average rating out of 100 to reviews from mainstream publications, this release received an average score of 74, based on 10 reviews.

== Track listing ==
You Know I'm Not Going Anywhere track listing
No.	Title	Length
1.	"My Only Ghost"	3:08
2.	"Hey Jo"	3:55
3.	"Cheap Regrets"	4:42
4.	"Velour and Velcro"	3:10
5.	"Changing"	4:00
6.	"Descend"	3:28
7.	"The Clouds"	4:01
8.	"Dancer"	3:52
9.	"Sidecar"	4:28
10.	"And the Horses All Go Swimming"	4:43
11.	"4th of July"	4:28
Total length:		43:55
