= If You See Me =

If You See Me may refer to:

- "If You See Me" (song), a song by The Black Keys from Thickfreakness
- If You See Me (EP), a 1997 EP by Tara MacLean
