= It's Not Funny =

2004 comedy album by David Cross

Studio album by David Cross
- Released: November 14, 2004
- Recorded: 2004
- Genre: Stand-up comedy
- Length: 73:06
- Label: Sub Pop/Stand Up! Records

David Cross chronology
Shut Up You Fucking Baby! (2002)	It's Not Funny (2004)	Bigger and Blackerer (2010)

Professional ratings
Review scores
Source	Rating
AllMusic	3/5 stars
Now	NNNN
Paste	3.5/5 stars
Pitchfork	(6.5/10)

It's Not Funny is David Cross' 2004 stand-up comedy album, released on Sub Pop Records.

The track titles, like those on Cross' previous record Shut Up You Fucking Baby!, have no relevance to the bits Cross does on the album and are instead there to make fun of material performed by other comedians, either on the whole or targeted at specific comedians. Cross has said the album's title references children being laughed at by their friends while trying to tell them something important, only to reply, "Come on guys, it's not funny." The album was released on CD by indie-rock label Sub Pop, and on vinyl by comedy label Stand Up! Records, which issued a limited LP edition of 500 for this release, as they had for Shut Up You Fucking Baby!. Like the CD, it also contains a hidden track that plays from the label out to a locked groove. This edition is a single LP, unlike its predecessor.

== Track listing ==
1. Certain Leaders in Government Look or Act like Certain Pop Culture References! – 4:51
2. Women, Please Rinse Off Your Vagina and Anus! – 5:10
3. I've Taken a Popular Contemporary Pop Song and Changed the Lyrics to Comment on the Proliferation of Starbucks in My Neighborhood! – 3:16
4. A Rapid Series of Comical Noises! – 3:57
5. Although Indigent, Rural Families Have Little to Say in the Matter, Third Rate Public Education Has Kept Them Ignorant and Thus, Great Sources of Ridicule! – 2:48
6. My Child is Enthralling, Especially When It Says Something Unexpectedly Precocious Even Though It Doesn't Understand What It Just Said! – 8:38
7. My Immigrant Mom Talks Funny! – 13:37
8. When It Comes to Jews, Behavior One Might Perceive as Obnoxious and Annoying I Present as 'Quirky' but It's Okay to Joke About It Because I, Myself, Am Jewish! – 6:01
9. Pandering to the Locals! – 7:13
10. Even Though I Am in the Closet, That Won't Prevent Me from Getting Cheap Laughs at the Expense of Homosexuals! – 2:37
11. Weathermen Have Become, for the Most Part, Obsolete! – 2:53
12. When All is Said and Done, I am Lonely and Miserable and Barely Able to Mask My Contempt for the Audience as I Trot Out the Same Sorry Act I've Been Doing Since the Mid-Eighties! – 12:51
  - Contains a hidden track after a period of silence with an additional comedy routine about then-former Creed vocalist Scott Stapp, and awkwardly meeting him on Celebrity Poker Showdown (he says in track 2 he would "rather hear the death rattle of [his] only child" than listen to Creed.)
