= Rubber Factory =

Studio album by the Black Keys
- Released: September 7, 2004
- Recorded: January – May 2004
- Studio: Sentient Sound (Akron, Ohio)
- Genres: Blues rock; garage rock
- Length: 41:43
- Label: Fat Possum
- Producer: The Black Keys

The Black Keys chronology
Thickfreakness (2003)	Rubber Factory (2004)	Chulahoma: The Songs of Junior Kimbrough (2006)

Singles from Rubber Factory
- 1. "10 A.M. Automatic" Released: August 23, 2004; 2. "'Till I Get My Way" Released: November 22, 2004; 3. "Girl Is On My Mind" Released: November 22, 2004

Rubber Factory is the third studio album by American rock duo the Black Keys. It was self-produced by the band and was released on September 7, 2004, on Fat Possum Records. The album was recorded in an abandoned tire factory in the group's hometown of Akron, Ohio. Rubber Factory received positive reviews and was the band's first album to chart on the Billboard 200 in the United States, reaching number 143.

== Recording and production ==
The Black Keys recorded their first two studio albums in drummer Patrick Carney's basement. The building was sold by its landlord, forcing them to find a new location for their third album. They decided to set up a makeshift studio in a dilapidated factory in their hometown of Akron, Ohio. Built by General Tire to manufacture rubber tires, the factory stood on the corner of S Seiberling Street and Little Cuyahoga River in the East Akron neighborhood. General Tire closed the factory in 1982, though space in the building was being leased out. The band rented the entire second floor of the building for $500 per month, and dubbed their workspace "Sentient Sound".

Carney said of the experience:

We were looking for a place and we saw the "for rent" sign and it's just this giant building and the first floor is where all the big storage rooms are, the big kind of cavernous rooms, and then the second floor is where they had all the offices and laboratories, and that's where we rented our space... we just kind of rented one room, but there was no one around us in that corner of the building so we had cables running out the door and across the hallway and into other rooms and stuff and it was basically just like this kind of deserted old building and we had free reign [sic] of it.

Carney called the factory "not really ideal in any way. It's too far away. It's on the second story. It's hot as hell. You can't open the windows. The acoustics are horrible." For recording, the group used a mixing console that Carney purchased on eBay from a former sound technician for Canadian rock band Loverboy. Frequent malfunctions with the console stretched the sessions nearly five months; the group ultimately left the console behind in the factory after completing Rubber Factory. The album was recorded on recycled tape provided by the band's record label Fat Possum from its studios in Mississippi.

In 2009, Carney said the factory was to be removed, and it was demolished in 2010. The vacant lot in which the factory used to stand appears on the cover of the band's 2011 single "Lonely Boy".

== Packaging ==
The sleeve artwork for Rubber Factory was designed by the group's creative director, Michael Carney, the brother of Patrick Carney. The artwork is a collage of local features, mainly from the desolate east side of Akron: abandoned storefronts, tire piles, the Goodyear Blimp, and even the Cathedral of Tomorrow's unfinished tower restaurant depicted as a smoke stack on the front of the album.

== Promotion ==
The song "When the Lights Go Out" was used in the film Black Snake Moan. The song "10 A.M. Automatic" was used in an American Express commercial, in the movie Live Free or Die, in the soundtrack for MLB '06: The Show, and in the movie The Go-Getter; this motion picture also features "Keep Me". Their version of "Grown So Ugly" can be heard during the party scene in the movie Cloverfield. "Girl Is on My Mind" was used on a commercial for Sony Ericsson mobile phones, as well as a Victoria's Secret commercial. "Stack Shot Billy" was performed on Late Show with David Letterman.

== Reception ==
Professional ratings
Aggregate scores
Source	Rating
Metacritic	81/100
Review scores
Source	Rating
AllMusic	4.5/5 stars
Boston Herald	3.5/4 stars
Entertainment Weekly	A
The Independent	4/5 stars
Mojo	4/5 stars
NME	7/10
Pitchfork	8.3/10
Q	3/5 stars
Rolling Stone	3/5 stars
Spin	B

Rubber Factory was met with critical acclaim. According to review aggregator website Metacritic, the album received an average critic score of 81 out of 100. James Hunter of The Washington Post said that the album "capitalizes richly on whatever it exactly was that caused the rock- and-roll commentariat to adopt [the band] in the first place as college-dropout makers of new indie-rock blues". In an enthusiastic article, David Browne of Entertainment Weekly gave the album an "A" and wrote six variations of a review for the album. He called it a "lo-fi version of classic-rock boogie—done by utterly earnest indie-rock nerds, and done the right way" and said that "the Keys had bested not only themselves but just about everyone else in rock this year". In a three-star review, Christian Hoard of Rolling Stone described the album as "high-impact scuzz-blues that aims for prime Hendrix and almost gets there, thanks mostly to Dan Auerbach's thick-ass guitar lines", but said that it was missing fully formed songs. Jonathan Zwickel of Pitchfork gave the record an 8.3/10, writing that, "There's more of an album feel to Rubber Factory, a conscious song-by-song progression rather than the visceral, overwhelming vibe that forged their debut, The Big Come Up, into a seething wrecking ball."

The album was the group's first to chart on the Billboard 200, reaching number 143. After the commercial success of their 2011 studio album El Camino, Rubber Factory re-entered the chart in May 2012, peaking at number 131.

== Track listing ==
All tracks are written by Dan Auerbach and Patrick Carney except where noted.

No.	Title	Length
1.	"When the Lights Go Out"	3:23
2.	"10 A.M. Automatic"	2:59
3.	"Just Couldn't Tie Me Down"	2:57
4.	"All Hands Against His Own"	3:16
5.	"The Desperate Man"	3:54
6.	"Girl Is on My Mind"	3:28
7.	"The Lengths"	4:54
8.	"Grown So Ugly" (Robert Pete Williams)	2:27
9.	"Stack Shot Billy"	3:21
10.	"Act Nice and Gentle" (Ray Davies)	2:41
11.	"Aeroplane Blues"	2:50
12.	"Keep Me"	2:52
13.	"Till I Get My Way"	2:31

Japanese bonus track
No.	Title	Length
14.	"Summertime Blues" (Eddie Cochran)	2:34

== Personnel ==
The Black Keys

- Dan Auerbach – guitars, fiddle, lap steel, vocals, hand claps
- Patrick Carney – drums, percussion, hand claps

Technical

- Patrick Carney – recording
- The Black Keys – production, mixing
- Greg Calbi – mastering

== Charts ==
Chart (2004–2005)	Peak position
Australian Albums (ARIA)	18
French Albums (SNEP)	123
Scottish Albums (Official Charts)	59
UK Albums (Official Charts)	62
UK Independent Albums (Official Charts)	11
US Billboard 200	131
US Heatseekers Albums (Billboard)	5
US Independent Albums (Billboard)	11
