= The Districts =

American rock band

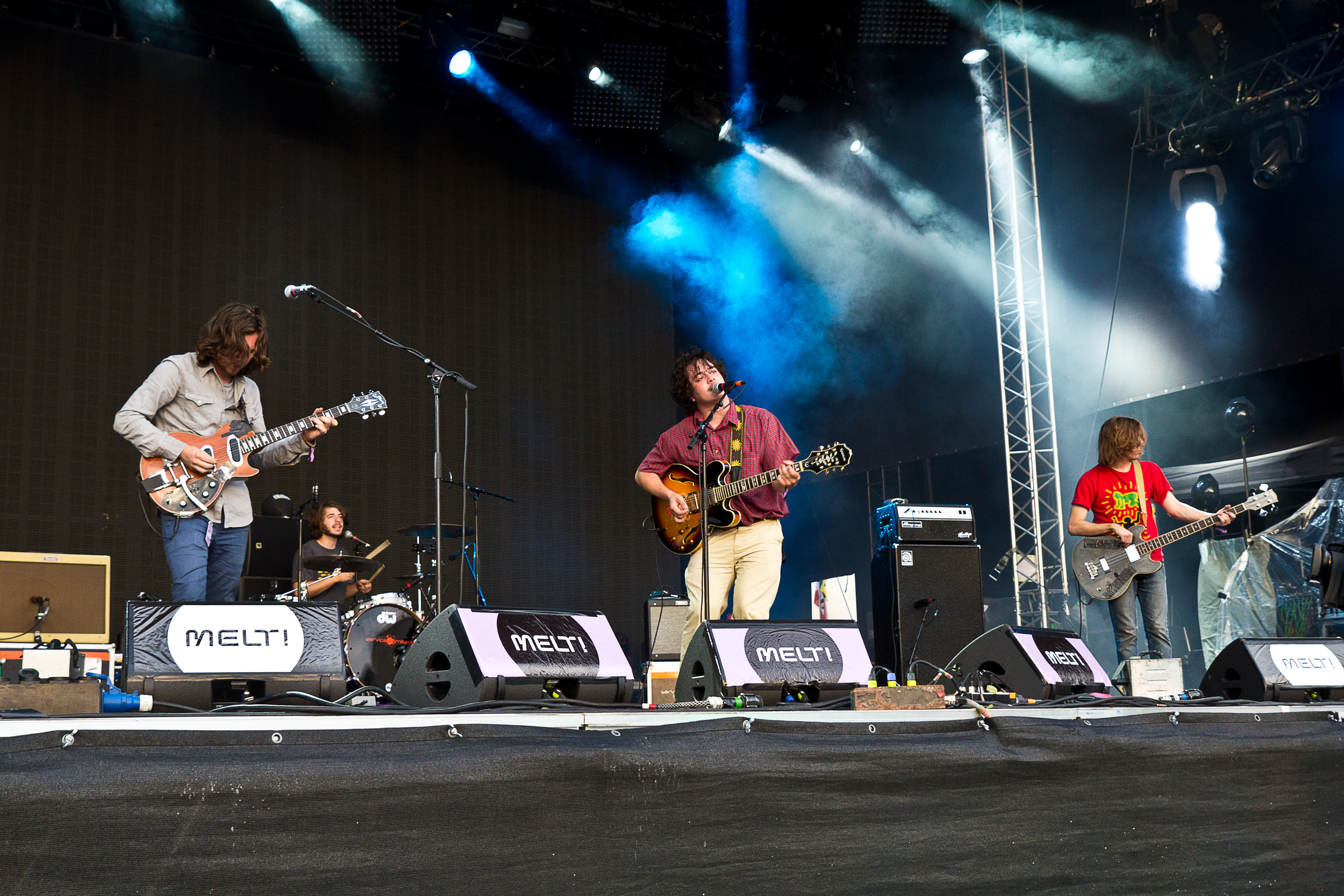
- The Districts at Melt! Festival in 2015

Background information
- Origin: Lititz, Pennsylvania
- Genres: Indie rock; garage rock; folk rock; roots rock; alternative rock
- Years active: 2009–2022
- Label: Fat Possum
- Members: Rob Grote; Braden Lawrence; Pat Cassidy
- Past members: Mark Larson; Josh Sunseri; Connor Jacobus; Alex Held
- Website: www.thedistrictsband.com

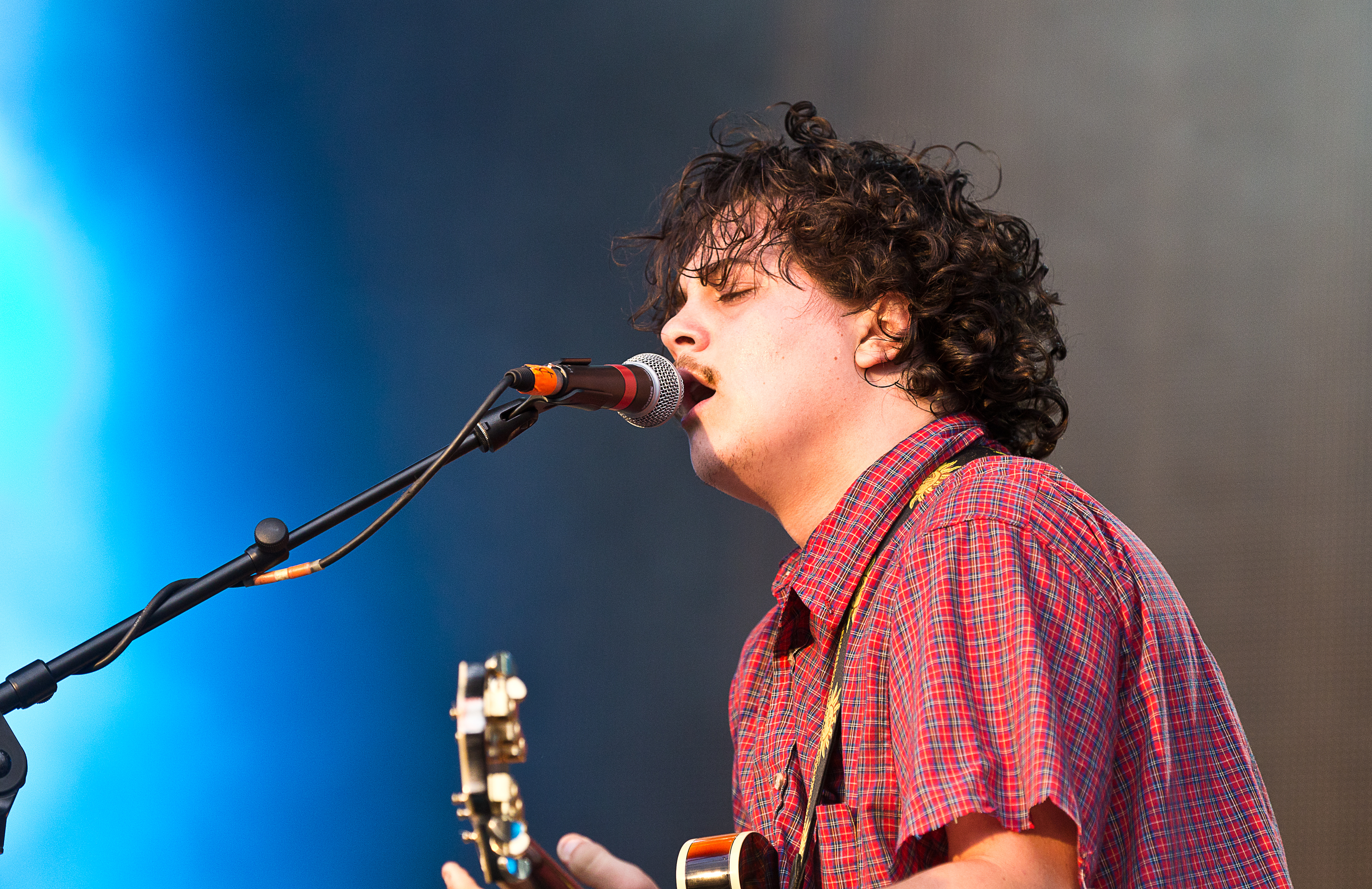
Rob Grote

The Districts was an American rock band originally from Lititz, Pennsylvania. The group formed in 2009 while members Rob Grote, Mark Larson, Connor Jacobus, and Braden Lawrence were all still in high school.

== History ==
The Districts were formed in 2009 by four high schoolers from Lititz, a borough in Lancaster County, Pennsylvania. The group self-released two EPs and a full-length album, Telephone, over the course of 2011 and 2012. Late in 2013, after a stint in viral success from a live studio session, The Districts signed with Fat Possum Records, and released an EP in early 2014 consisting of three remastered tracks from their previous releases and two new songs. By 2014 the group had relocated from Lititz to Philadelphia. In February 2015, the group's second full-length album, A Flourish and a Spoil, produced by John Congleton, also appeared on the Fat Possum label. This album peaked at #7 on the Billboard Heatseekers chart and #28 on the Top Independent Albums chart. In August 2017, the band released their third full-length album, Popular Manipulations, once again under the Fat Possum label. In March 2019, the band released their fourth full-length album, You Know I'm Not Going Anywhere and in March 2022 they released their last full-length album, Great American Painting. Both of the albums were under Fat Possum Label.

After the release and tour of Great American Painting all members of the band went their separate ways. Lead vocalist Rob Grote continued his career under the name Super Infinity. Rhythm guitarist Pat Cassidy also pursued a solo path. Drummer Braden Lawrence initially launched a solo project and released one album. In 2025, he formed a duo called Beaming with musician Derek Ted.

In October 2025, the band announced on social media that their first EP, Kitchen Songs, was returning to Spotify and Bandcamp.

== Members ==
Current

- Rob Grote - vocals, guitar
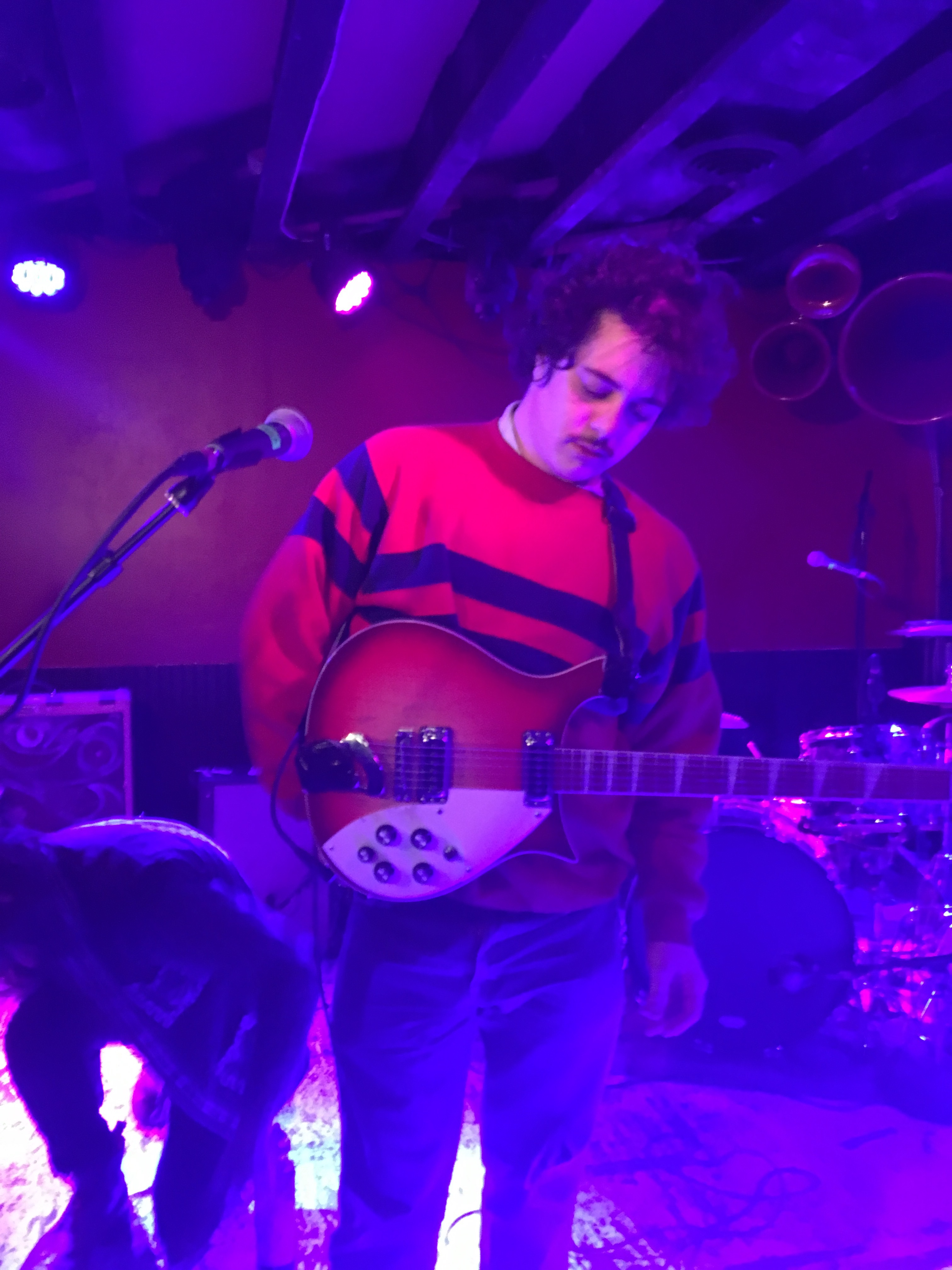
  Rob Grote at DC9 Nightclub
- Braden Lawrence - drums, bass
- Pat Cassidy - rhythm guitar
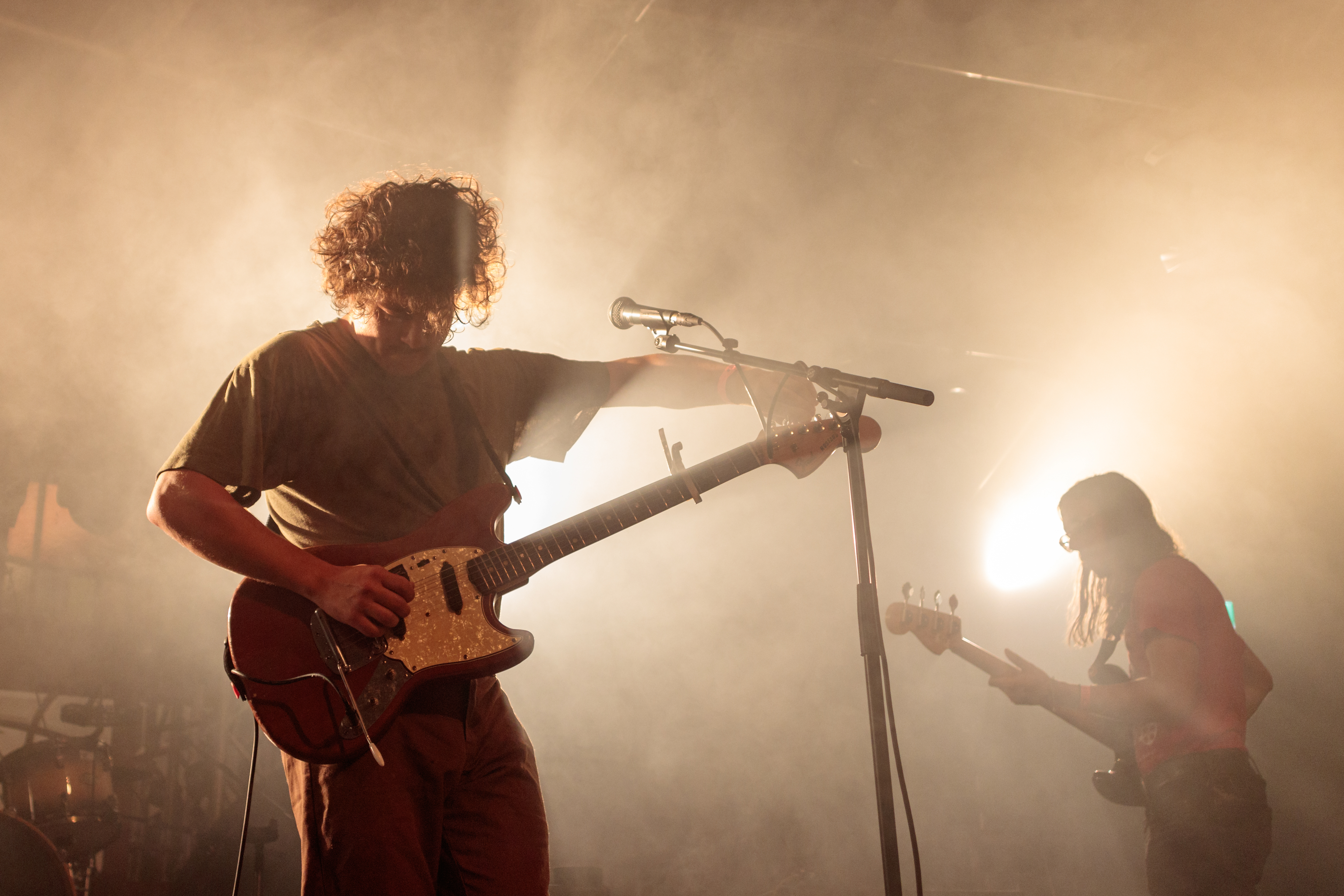
Rob Grote

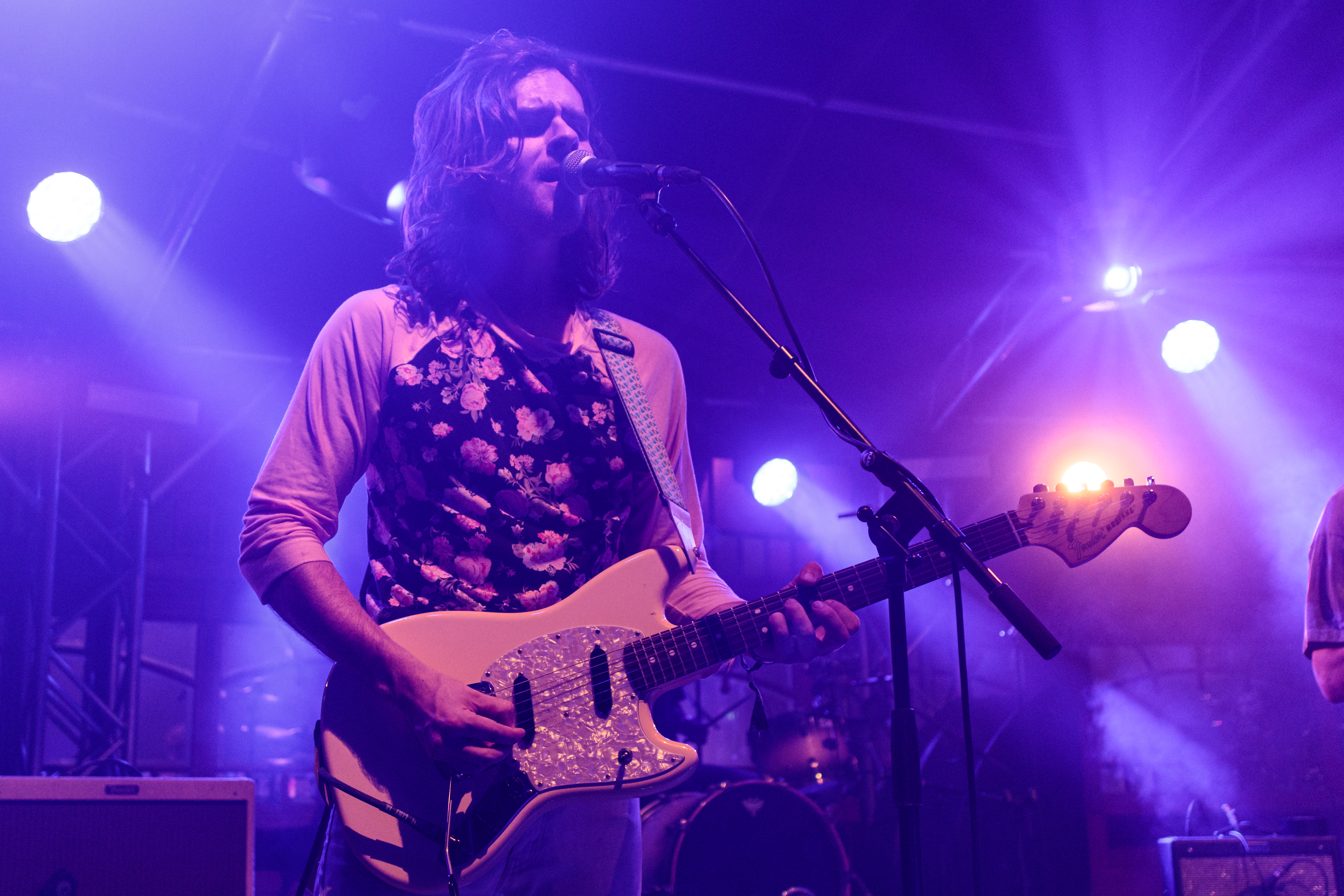
Pat Cassidy

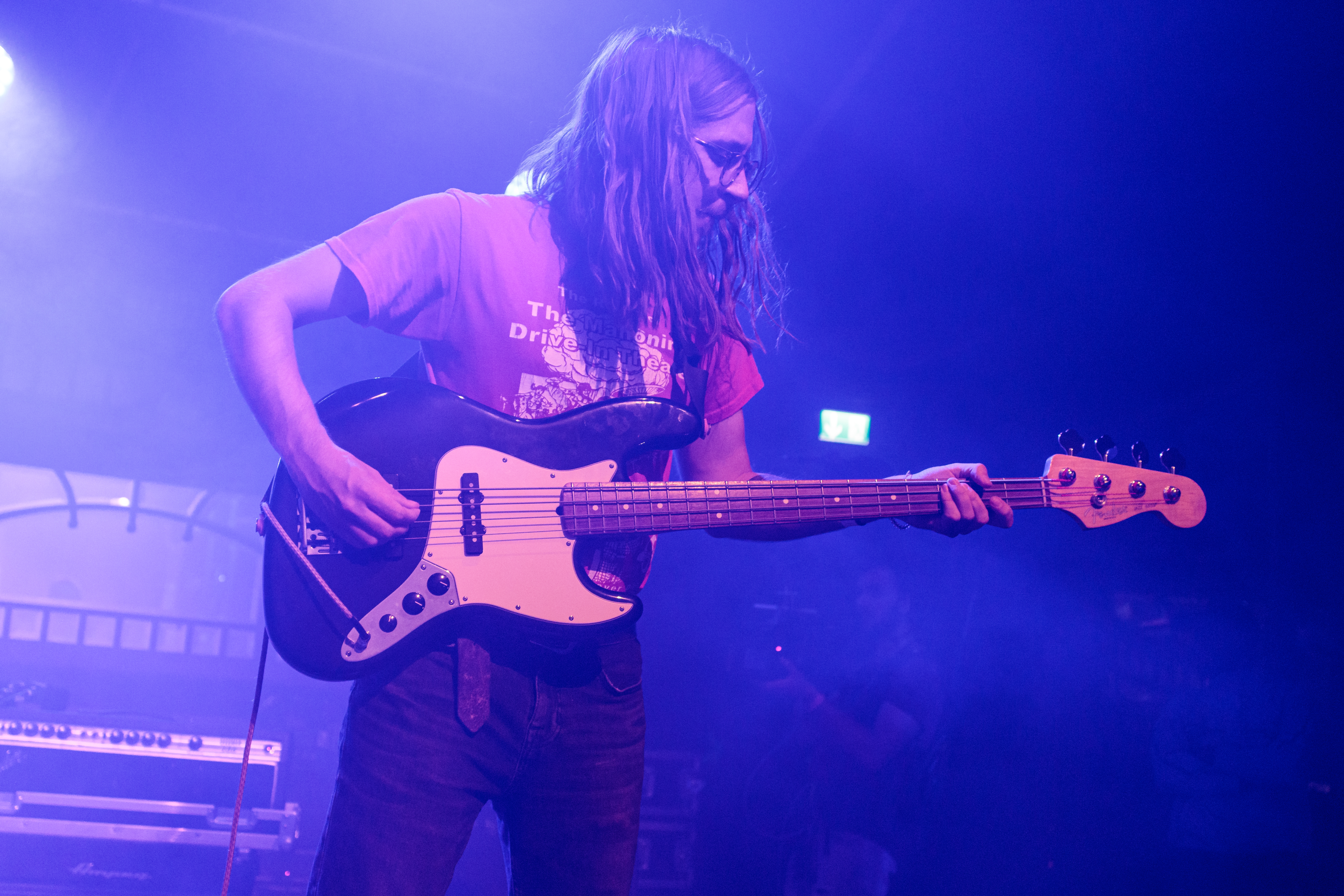
Connor Jacobus

Former

- Mark Larson - guitar
- Josh Sunseri
- Connor Jacobus - bass
- Alex Held - Drums

== Discography ==
Albums

- Telephone (2012)
- A Flourish and a Spoil (2015)
- Popular Manipulations (2017)
- You Know I'm Not Going Anywhere (2020)
- Great American Painting (2022)

EPs

- Kitchen Songs (2011)
- While You Were in Honesdale (2012)
- The Districts (2014)
