= I Drink for a Reason =

2009 book by David Cross

- Author: David Cross
- Language: English
- Genre: Comedy
- Publisher: Grand Central Publishing
- Publication date: August 31, 2009
- Publication place: United States
- Media type: Hardcover, audiobook
- Pages: 256
- ISBN: 978-0-446-57948-3

I Drink for a Reason is a 2009 book by American actor and comedian David Cross. The book features memoirs, satirical fictional memoirs and material from Cross that originally appeared in other publications.

== Audiobook ==
An audiobook of the book was read by Cross featuring guest appearances by H. Jon Benjamin and Kristen Schaal and the bands Les Savy Fav and Yo La Tengo. Cross would frequently digress from the book to comment directly to the listener, often to chide them for buying an audio book over the written version.

== Reception ==
Publishers Weekly wrote: "Though he admits inviting the charge of elitism with some of his material, Cross avoids condescending to his demographic while knocking out a steady stream of laugh-out-loud quips." Nigel Duara of The State Journal-Register wrote that the book "doesn't hold up nearly as well" as Cross's on-stage comedy and that it "isn't so much a profanity-laden polemic as a series of decently aimed critiques that reserves its sharpest criticism for hipster culture." Evan Sawdey of PopMatters gave the book a 5/10 and wrote: "What’s unfortunate is that Cross' thoughtful, considered standup routines do not prepare you for the wildly uneven, remarkably slapdash effort that is I Drink for a Reason, a hit-or-miss collection of jokes from someone we expect far, far better from."
