= David Cross =

American stand-up comedian and actor (born 1964)

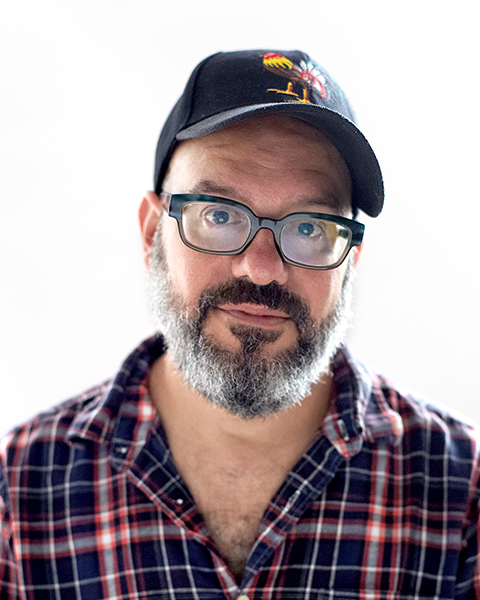
- Cross in 2012
- Born: April 4, 1964 (age 62); Roswell, Georgia, U.S.
- Notable work: Mr. Show; Arrested Development; The Increasingly Poor Decisions of Todd Margaret; Freak Show; Alvin and the Chipmunks; Kung Fu Panda; Megamind; Grand Theft Auto: San Andreas
- Spouse: Amber Tamblyn (m. 2012)
- Children: 1
- Relatives: Russ Tamblyn (father-in-law)

Comedy career
- Years active: 1982–present
- Genres: Political satire; Alternative comedy; Black comedy; Blue comedy; Sketch comedy

David Cross (born April 4, 1964) is an American stand-up comedian, actor, writer, and television producer. Cross is best known for his stand-up performances, the HBO sketch comedy series Mr. Show with Bob and David (1995–1998), his role as Ian Hawke in the first three Alvin and the Chipmunks movies, and his role as Tobias Fünke in the Fox/Netflix sitcom Arrested Development (2003–2006, 2013–2019). He has been described as "one of the defining figures of cult Gen X comedy".

Cross created, wrote, executive produced, and starred in The Increasingly Poor Decisions of Todd Margaret (2010–2016); developed and had a prominent role in Freak Show (2006); appeared on Modern Family (2011–2012); and portrayed Ian Hawke in Alvin and the Chipmunks (2007), Alvin and the Chipmunks: The Squeakquel (2009), and Alvin and the Chipmunks: Chipwrecked (2011). Cross has also done voice work for the sitcom Oliver Beene (2003–2004), and has had lead voice-over roles in Curious George (2006), Battle for Terra (2007), the Kung Fu Panda film franchise (2008–2016), Megamind (2010), and Next Gen (2018).

In 1993, he won a Primetime Emmy Award for Outstanding Writing for a Variety Series for his work on The Ben Stiller Show. For Mr. Show with Bob and David, he gained three Primetime Emmy Award nominations, and for Arrested Development, Cross was nominated for a Satellite Award for Best Supporting Actor – Television Series, and, along with his cast, for three Screen Actors Guild Award for Outstanding Performance by an Ensemble in a Comedy Series. For his stand-up specials, he was nominated for several Grammy Awards.

== Early life ==
Cross was born in Roswell, Georgia, to Jewish parents, Barry and Susi Cross. His father is an immigrant from Leeds, England. He is the oldest of three children and has two younger sisters.

Six months after his birth, Cross's family moved to Florida. After additional moves to New York and Connecticut, the family re-settled in Roswell, where Cross remained for nearly a decade. Cross attended Crestwood High School in Dunwoody, Georgia before transferring to Northside High School.

The family had little money. Cross recalled that they were evicted from their home and that he spent some time living in motels and at friends' homes in his youth. Cross's father left the family when Cross was 10 years old; the two have not spoken since Cross was 19, though they both primarily resided in New York City until Cross sold his home there in 2011.

== Career ==
=== Stand-up ===
Cross began performing stand-up comedy around the age of 17. The day after he graduated from Northside High School in Atlanta, Cross relocated to New York City. Lacking a plan, he drifted, working briefly for a lawn care company on Long Island. Later, he enrolled at Emerson College in Boston. He would drop out after a semester, but during his time there, Cross joined This is Pathetic, a college sketch group, where he met John Ennis. Aspiring toward an acting career, the two took a road trip to Los Angeles in the summer of 1985, although this did not significantly further their acting careers. In Boston, Cross began to perform stand-up more regularly. From the mid-1980s to the early 1990s, Boston had a booming comedy scene, although Cross did not fit the types of acts being booked most of the time. He recalls that it was "a loud, dumb, pandering, racist, homophobic-type scene".

In 1990, a new comedy scene began to emerge at the comedy club chain Catch a Rising Star. Alongside Janeane Garofalo, Louis C.K., and other comics, Cross appeared regularly several nights a week. Cross formed the sketch comedy group "Cross Comedy" with 12 other performers, and they put on a new show every week. They were known for playing tricks on the audience, such as introducing fake comics or planting fake hecklers. Cross became increasingly focused on his comedy work.

Cross later performed at the alternative comedy club Un-Cabaret in Los Angeles, where radio artist Joe Frank heard him, and hired him to appear in Frank's 1994 radio programs, "A Hearing" and "The Last Run" (in 1997 combined to become "The OJ Chronicles"), where Cross appears as OJ's valet. Cross also starred in the Joe Frank program "Jam", produced in 1999, and worked with Frank on radio shows for KCRW's Unfictional: "A Conversation" (2013) and "Downfall" (2015).

Cross's stand-up comedy blends political commentary and satire. In 1999, he performed a one-hour comedy special, The Pride Is Back, on HBO. In 2003, he released his first tour film, Let America Laugh, and was named No. 85 on Comedy Central's list of the 100 greatest stand-ups of all time. He has released five comedy albums: 2002's Shut Up You Fucking Baby!, 2004's It's Not Funny, 2010's Bigger and Blackerer, 2016's Making America Great Again/...America... Great..., and 2019's Oh, Come On. He was nominated for the Grammy Award for Best Comedy Album twice, in 2003 for Shut Up You Fucking Baby! and in 2016 for ...America... Great....

Cross's first three records were released on CD by indie-rock label Sub Pop, and on vinyl by comedy label Stand Up! Records for Shut Up and It's Not Funny. He self-released 2016's ...America... Great... on CD, with Stand Up! again releasing a vinyl version. Oh, Come On was released by Comedy Dynamics. Cross tends to release his albums in overlapping audio and video formats which each contain material not found on the other. This is the case on Bigger and Blackerer, Oh, Come On, and perhaps most obviously the 2016 companion set Making America Great Again (a Netflix film) and ...America... Great... (CD/vinyl audio), which have different titles. Oh, Come On's video and audio versions were recorded at two different shows on the same tour.

Cross's stand-up material was featured in Comedy Central's 2004 animated series Shorties Watchin' Shorties. He appears on several Un-Cabaret compilation albums, including Freak Weather Feels Different and The Good, the Bad and the Drugly.

=== Television, film and voice roles ===
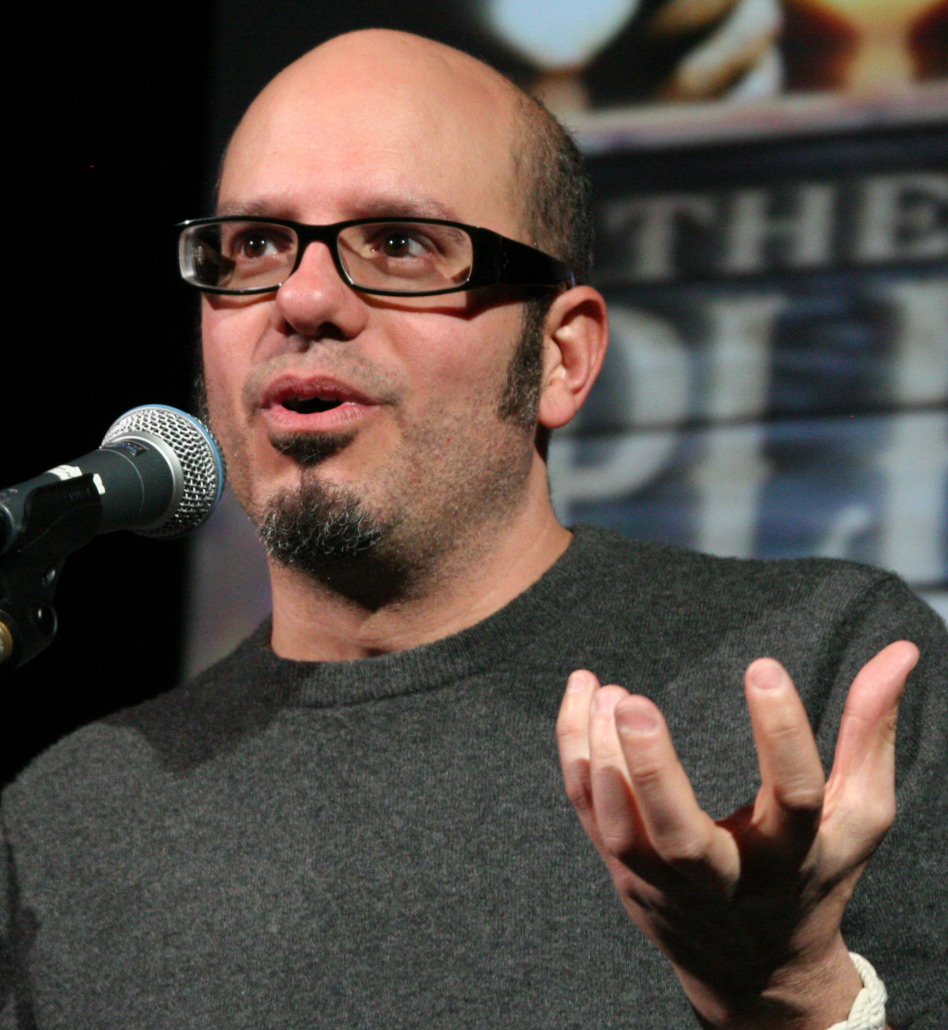
Cross at the 2007 Plug Awards

Cross began his professional television career as a writer on The Ben Stiller Show. The series hired him toward the end of its run, and he occasionally made brief appearances in the sketches. He had a speaking role in "The Legend of T.J. O'Pootertoot", a sketch written almost entirely by Cross. It was during this period that he first met Bob Odenkirk, with whom he would later co-create the HBO sketch comedy series Mr. Show with Bob and David (Mr. Show) in 1995. Cross won an Emmy for his work on The Ben Stiller Show in 1993. In 1997 he played Newton, an employee of the NYC Morgue in Men in Black, and reprised the character, now as an owner of a video rental store, in Men in Black II in 2002.

Cross later co-starred as Tobias Fünke in Arrested Development, originally intended to be only a minor role. He also played smaller roles on programs such as Just Shoot Me!, The Drew Carey Show, NewsRadio, Strangers with Candy, Tim and Eric Awesome Show, Great Job, and Aqua Teen Hunger Force. From October 2005, Cross regularly appeared on Comedy Central's The Colbert Report as Stephen Colbert's nemesis Russ Lieber, a fictional liberal radio talk show host from Madison, Wisconsin. Cross developed an animated series for Comedy Central called Freak Show, which co-starred H. Jon Benjamin and was cancelled due to low ratings. He has appeared several times on Wonder Showzen.

Cross teamed up with Mr. Show director and producer Troy Miller and Odenkirk to produce a feature film Run Ronnie Run, based on one of their Mr. Show characters. The film satirized the reality television craze, and featured cameos from many stars; however, Odenkirk got into conflict with the studio New Line Cinema, and they released it direct-to-video. In 1994 and again in 1999, Cross was a guest voice actor on Joe Frank's radio show, featured in the episodes "The Last Run", "A Hearing", "The O.J. Chronicles", and "Jam". In 2013, he returned, making an appearance in an episode of Frank's radio show, entitled "A Conversation".

In 2004, Cross provided voices for a Marine in Halo 2 and a store clerk named "Zero" in Grand Theft Auto: San Andreas. He was also the voice of the "Happy-Time Harry" doll and Bert Banana in Aqua Teen Hunger Force (although the part was credited as Sir Willups Brightslymoore). Cross has made guest appearances in Tim and Eric Awesome Show, Great Job! He directed the music video for The Black Keys' song "10 A.M. Automatic", a spoof of public-access television. Paste Magazine ranked it number 24 on their list of the 50 Best Music Videos of the Decade (2000–2009).

Cross appeared in The Strokes' music video for "Juicebox" as a bad local "morning zoo" radio DJ. He also appeared in The New Pornographers' video for "Use It", in Superchunk's video for "Watery Hands" (along with Janeane Garofalo), and in Yo La Tengo's video for "Sugarcube" (along with Bob Odenkirk and John Ennis). Cross contributes to Vice magazine, writing a column, My America. In 2005, he contributed to the UNICEF benefit song "Do They Know It's Hallowe'en?" and appeared in one of PETA's "I'd Rather Go Naked Than Wear Fur" campaigns.

In the Beastie Boys' 2006 concert film Awesome; I Fuckin' Shot That!, Cross portrays Nathaniel Hörnblowér in the fictional segment "A Day in the Life of Nathaniel Hörnblowér". In I'm Not There, Cross portrays Allen Ginsberg. Both Bill Lawrence and Zach Braff of the TV series Scrubs were eager to have Cross make a cameo appearance on the series as Tobias Fünke, but due to the series' cancellation, the plan never came to fruition.

Cross provided commentary on the Vicarious music video DVD for Tool. He has previously performed comedy as an opening act for the band and its members appeared on Mr. Show several times. He portrayed Ian Hawke in the Alvin and the Chipmunks film series and voiced Crane in the Kung Fu Panda film franchise.

Cross starred in David's Situation, a pilot for HBO. It filmed in May 2008 and included many Mr. Show alumni at the taping. On August 6, 2008, Bob Odenkirk announced on bobanddavid.com that David's Situation would not be produced.

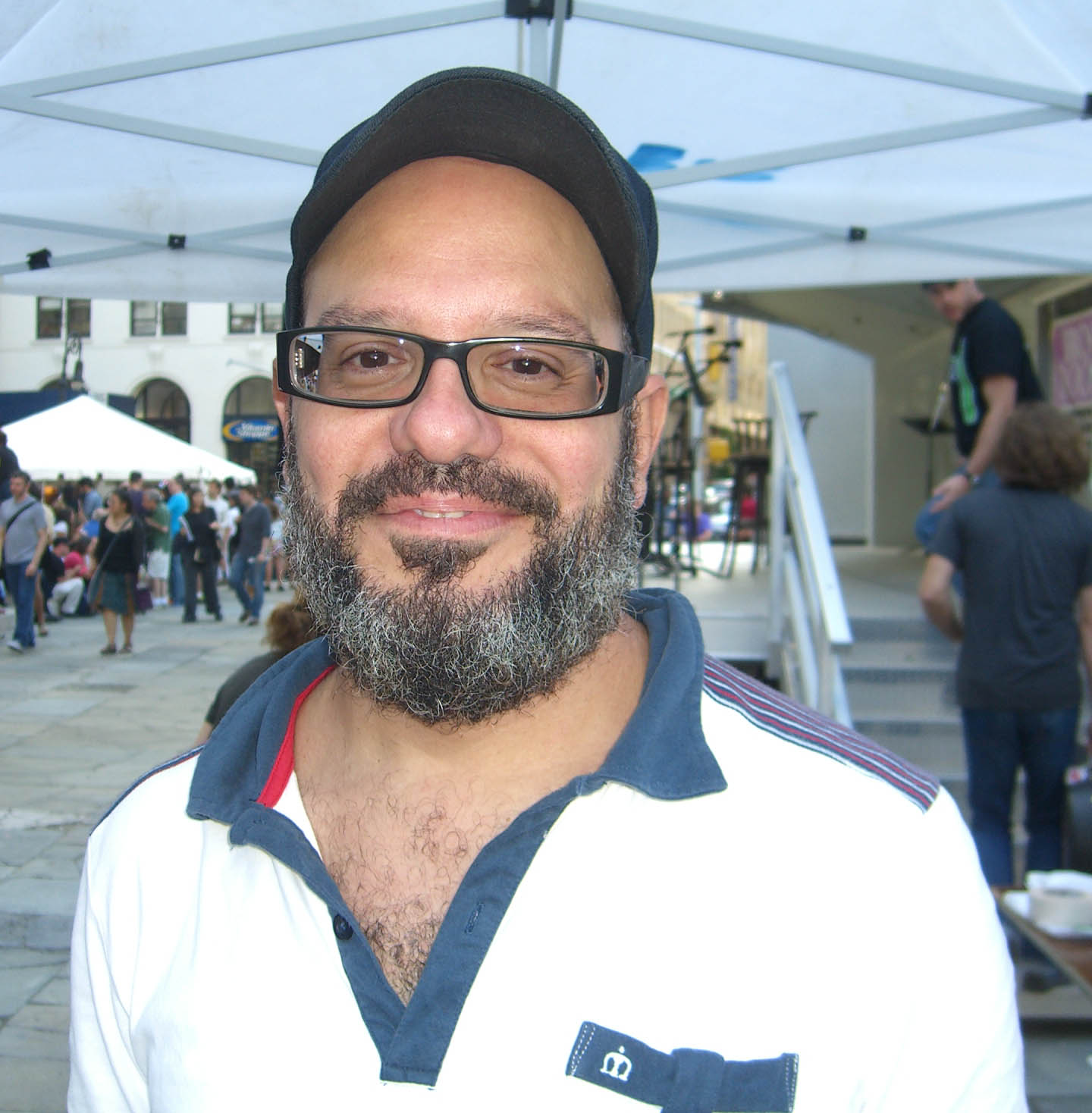
Cross at the 2009 Brooklyn Book Festival

Cross's black comedy series The Increasingly Poor Decisions of Todd Margaret, in which he stars and co-writes with Shaun Pye, has run on Channel 4 in the United Kingdom and IFC in the United States since October 2010, for a total 18 episodes. On March 29, 2010, his first comedy special in six years, Bigger and Blackerer, was streamed on Epix HD. A CD with "slightly different content" was released on May 25, 2010.

In 2009, Cross released his first book I Drink for a Reason. The book features memoirs, satirical fictional memoirs, and material from Cross that originally appeared in other publications. In September 2009, Cross performed at his own comedy stage at the ATP New York 2009 music festival, for which he picked Eugene Mirman, H. Jon Benjamin, Jon Glaser, and Derrick Brown & The Navy Gravy to join him. In the same year, Cross and Benjamin created and wrote for Paid Programming on Adult Swim. Paid Programming was not picked up for a full series and Benjamin referred to it as an "abject failure".

Cross starred alongside Julia Stiles and America Ferrera in It's a Disaster, which premiered at the 2012 Los Angeles Film Festival. Oscilloscope Laboratories acquired US distribution rights to the film, releasing it in select theaters beginning April 13, 2013.

Cross's directorial debut film Hits premiered at the 2014 Sundance Film Festival. Instead of selling the film rights to distributors, Cross instead opted to sell the movie over Bit Torrent through their "bundles" program, which BitTorrent launched to help "legitimize" the platform. According to The Verge, it was the first feature film to be distributed in such a format. At the same time, Cross launched a Kickstarter campaign for the movie's general release which would then distribute the movie using a pay what you want methodology.

In April 2015, episodes were ordered for a new sketch comedy show starring Cross and Odenkirk called W/ Bob & David. It premiered in November 2015 on Netflix. Cross and Odenkirk write, star in, and produce the show.

On the January 10, 2016, broadcast of the National Public Radio-syndicated quiz show Ask Me Another, Cross appeared as a celebrity guest and performed well enough that at the audience's request the show's producers took the unusual step of allowing him to advance to the show's final, championship round; he then won that round and became that episode's overall champion, winning a prize package that included a pair of denim cutoff shorts that he himself had autographed.

He created the eight-episode black comedy series Bliss, which was released by the BritBox streaming service in 2018. It stars Stephen Mangan as Andrew, a fraudulent travel writer, who is struggling to maintain long-term relationships with two partners, Kim (Heather Graham) and Denise (Jo Hartley), who are not aware of one another. The same year Cross provided the lead character's "white voice" in the science fiction comedy film Sorry to Bother You (2018).

On October 16, 2025, Cross guest starred as Nolan Hurst, in the TV series Elsbeth, episode titled Doll Day Afternoon on CBS.

== Influences ==
Cross has said his comedic influences include Bill Hicks, Andy Kaufman, Monty Python's Flying Circus, Lou Costello, Steven Wright, Richard Pryor, and Lenny Bruce.

== Controversies ==
In October 2005, Cross was sued by Nashville club manager Thomas Weber, who accused Cross of supposedly taping him without permission for Shut Up You Fucking Baby and Let America Laugh in apparent violation of Weber's privacy rights. In April 2006, the case against Cross was dismissed and the case proceeded with Warner Music, Subpop Records, WEA Corporation, and the Alternative Distribution Alliance. In October 2017, Cross apologized to actor-comedian Lo Mutuc, at the time known by the name Charlyne Yi, after they reported that he had made racially insensitive comments toward them in the mid-2000s and later. He later theorized that he was doing an impression of a Southern redneck. Five days later, he tweeted, "Charlyne I'm sorry that I hurt you and that this whole thing played out as it did."

In August 2018, members of the Church of Jesus Christ of Latter-day Saints protested against a photo which Cross tweeted of himself wearing "Mormon religious undergarments." The tweet was meant to promote his show at the University of Utah's Kingsbury Hall in Salt Lake City, Utah. The university president issued a statement condemning apparent "bigotry and religious intolerance" and calling the imagery "deeply offensive." Citing the First Amendment, the university said it would not "censor the content of those coming to campus."

=== Criticisms and feuds ===
==== Larry the Cable Guy ====
In April 2005, Cross criticized stand-up comedian Larry the Cable Guy in a Rolling Stone interview, saying, "It's a lot of anti-gay, racist humor—which people like in America—all couched in 'I'm telling it like it is.' He's in the right place at the right time for that gee-shucks, proud-to-be-a-redneck, I'm-just-a-straight-shooter-multimillionaire-in-cutoff-flannel-selling-ring-tones act. That's where we are as a nation now. We're in a state of vague American values and anti-intellectual pride."

In response, Larry devoted a chapter in his book GIT-R-DONE to Cross and the "PC left," claiming that Cross had supposedly "screwed with my fans, it was time for me to say something." Larry claimed that Rolling Stone was baiting comedians to attack him, and they turned to Cross only after Lewis Black refused, as Larry and Black are good friends. Cross responded with An Open Letter to Larry the Cable Guy posted on his website. He continued to mock Larry in his stand-up, satirizing Blue Collar TV during a guest appearance on Wonder Showzen. In December 2005, he ended his performance on Comedy Central's Last Laugh '05 by mockingly yelling Larry's catchphrase, "GIT-R-DONE!", to the audience as he left the stage. He poked fun at Larry's comedy in Freak Show with a character called "Danny the Plumber Guy."

==== James Lipton ====
Cross criticized Inside the Actors Studio host James Lipton on a Mr. Show sketch and in his stand-up performance The Pride Is Back, calling him "pretentious." Lipton, who thought Cross's impression of him was not good-natured, later appeared alongside Cross in Arrested Development, in the recurring role of Prison Warden Stefan Gentles. During filming, Cross was impressed with Lipton's acting and comedic ability, and the two became good friends. On one commentary track for season four of Mr. Show, Cross discussed the encounter, complimenting Lipton for his professionalism and performance, saying that he liked Lipton personally but still "didn't care for" Inside The Actors Studio.

==== Alvin and the Chipmunks ====
Despite critical praise for his performance, David Cross received backlash from fans for his role in Alvin and the Chipmunks. In December 2007, comedian Patton Oswalt joked in a MySpace blog post that he and fellow comedian Brian Posehn were offered the role of Ian but rejected it, adding, "We both threw the script across the room in disgust. David Cross caught it." Responding to critics of his decision to appear in the film, Cross said he had rejected the role initially but reconsidered. Cross reprised his role as Ian Hawke in Alvin and the Chipmunks: The Squeakquel (2009) and Alvin and the Chipmunks: Chipwrecked (2011). Cross described Chipwrecked as "literally without question, the most unpleasant experience I've ever had in my professional life." He accused an unidentified female producer of antisemitism and mistreating him. He was also "forced at legal gunpoint" to spend a week shooting footage on a Carnival Cruise, which Cross argued was unnecessary since he had no lines and was unrecognizable in a pelican suit. The comments cost Cross a $150,000 bonus for violating his non-disparagement clause by discussing his grievances publicly.

== Personal life ==
Cross married Amber Tamblyn in 2012. On February 21, 2017, Tamblyn announced that she and Cross had a daughter.

Cross was raised Jewish, but became an atheist in adulthood, and no longer practices Judaism.

On September 26, 2013, Kickstarter co-founder Yancey Strickler revealed that Cross was the first investor in the crowdfunding platform. Strickler included Cross among the "friends and family" who first financed Kickstarter in 2006.

Cross discusses working with Adam Yauch of the Beastie Boys with Catie Lazarus, 2015

Cross is a fan of and friends with the musical group Beastie Boys. He is sampled on the beginning of the group's single "Ch-Check It Out" from their album To the 5 Boroughs. One of the group's members, Mike D, did not believe that this was Cross's voice in the sample, and Cross says he had to perform the voice in front of Diamond to prove it was actually him. Cross revealed this while hosting the Beastie Boys SiriusXM channel. Cross also appeared in the group's music video for "Make Some Noise" which was nominated for Video of The Year at the 2011 MTV Video Music Awards. In the Spike Jonze directed documentary Beastie Boys Story in 2020, Cross has a post-credit scene in which he interrupts the group's theater performance to poke fun at the commercial failure of their second album, Paul's Boutique.

Cross has dual British and American citizenship.

== Views ==
Cross has described his political philosophy as "definitely more socialist Democrat than centrist politician". In an interview in 2016, Cross praised Senator Bernie Sanders and said he admired Sanders "way before he ran for President". In 2021, Cross featured on a video produced by the Gravel Institute, a progressive think tank.

In October 2023, Cross signed the Artists4Ceasefire open letter calling for a permanent ceasefire in the Gaza War. In March 2025, during an interview with Katie Halper, Cross referred to the state of Israel as "corrupt" and an "apartheid state."

Cross condemned the Riyadh Comedy Festival and several of the comedians performing, due to the human rights record in Saudi Arabia. He referred to the government of Saudi Arabia as "literally, the most oppressive regime on Earth". He stated that the comedians who signed on are "performing for blood money", and that the comedians who in their acts complain about cancel culture and a lack of freedom of speech were hypocritical. Cross concluded the open letter by encouraging people to donate to the Human Rights Foundation.

== Discography ==
=== Comedy albums ===
Year	Title	Label	Notes
1999	The Pride Is Back	HBO	Video Special
2002	Shut Up You Fucking Baby!	Sub Pop (CD); Stand Up! Records (vinyl)	Album; Nominated–Grammy Award for Best Comedy Album (2003)
2004	It's Not Funny	Sub Pop (CD); Stand Up! Records (vinyl)	Album
2010	Bigger and Blackerer	Sub Pop	Video Special and album
2016	Making America Great Again	Netflix (Video special); Self-released (CD); Stand Up! Records (vinyl)	Video Special and album...America...Great... Nominated–Grammy Award for Best Comedy Album (2016)
2019	Oh, Come On	Comedy Dynamics	Video Special and album
2022	I'm from the Future	Self-released	Video Special
2024	Worst Daddy in The World	800 Pound Gorilla Media	Video Special

=== Compilation appearances ===
Year	Title	Notes
1993	Two Drink Minimum	Showcase
1996	HBO Comedy Half-Hour	Showcase
2004	Rock Against Bush, Vol. 1	Compilation
2005	Invite Them Up	Compilation
2007	Comedy Death-Ray	Compilation
2008	Awesome Record, Great Songs! Volume One	Compilation

== Bibliography ==
Year	Title	Publisher
2009	I Drink for a Reason	Grand Central Publishing, New York (ISBN 978-0-446-57948-3)
2013	Hollywood Said No!	

== Filmography ==
=== Film ===
Year	Title	Role	Notes
1995	Destiny Turns on the Radio	Ralph Dellaposa	
1996	The Truth About Cats & Dogs	Male Radio Caller / Bookstore Man	
1996	The Cable Guy	Sales Manager	
1996	Waiting for Guffman	UFO Expert	
1997	Who's the Caboose?	Jaded Guy	
1997	Men in Black	Newton, Morgue Attendant	
1998	Small Soldiers	Irwin Wayfair	
1998	The Thin Pink Line	Tommy Dantsbury	
1999	Can't Stop Dancing	Chapman	
2000	Chain of Fools	Andy	
2001	Ghost World	Gerrold	
2001	Dr. Dolittle 2	Hound Dog & Owl	Voice
2001	Pootie Tang	Pootie Tang Impostor	
2001	Scary Movie 2	Dwight Hartman	
2001	One Day...	The Turd	Short film
2002	Life Without Dick	Rex	
2002	Men in Black II	Newton	
2002	Martin & Orloff	Dan Wasserman	
2002	Run Ronnie Run	Ronnie Dobbs / Pootie T / Chow Chow's voice	Also writer
2003	Melvin Goes to Dinner	Seminar Leader	
2003	Let America Laugh	Himself	Also writer
2004	Eternal Sunshine of the Spotless Mind	Rob Eakin	
2006	Awesome; I Fuckin' Shot That!	Nathaniel Hörnblowér	
2006	She's the Man	Principal Gold	
2006	Curious George	Junior Bloomsberry	Voice
2006	School for Scoundrels	Ian Winsky	
2007	Crashing	Man In Space	
2007	The Grand	Larry Schwartzman	
2007	I'm Not There	Allen Ginsberg	
2007	Battle for Terra	Giddy	Voice
2007	Alvin and the Chipmunks	Ian Hawke	
2008	The Toe Tactic	Timmy	Voice
2008	Futurama: The Beast with a Billion Backs	Yivo	Voice; Direct-To-DVD
2008	Kung Fu Panda	Crane	Voice
2008	Secrets of the Furious Five	Crane	Voice; Short film
2008	The Legend of Secret Pass	Loo	Voice
2009	Meltdown	Ham Sandwich	Short film
2009	Year One	Cain	
2009	Alvin and the Chipmunks: The Squeakquel	Ian Hawke	
2010	Megamind	Minion	Voice
2011	Fight For Your Right Revisited	Nathaniel Hörnblowér	Short film
2011	Megamind: The Button of Doom	Minion	Voice; Short film
2011	Alvin and the Chipmunks: Chipwrecked	Ian Hawke	
2011	Kung Fu Panda 2	Crane	Voice
2011	Demoted	Ken Castro	
2012	It's a Disaster	Glenn Randolph	
2013	Kill Your Darlings	Louis Ginsberg	
2013	The Gynotician	Gynotician	Short film Also co-writer
2014	Hits		Director and writer
2014	Obvious Child	Sam	
2015	The Wolfpack Project		Documentary; Executive producer
2015	Pitch Perfect 2	Riff-Off Host	Credited as Sir Willups Brightslymoore
2016	Kung Fu Panda: Secrets of the Scroll	Crane	Voice; Short film
2016	Kung Fu Panda 3	Crane	Voice
2016	Folk Hero & Funny Guy	Chris DeRose	
2017	The Post	Howard Simons	
2018	Sorry to Bother You	Cash's white voice	Voice
2018	Next Gen	Dr. Rice / Q-Bots	Voice
2020	Beastie Boys Story	Himself	Documentary
2020	The Dark Divide	Robert Michael Pyle	
2021	8-Bit Christmas	Dealer	
2023	You Hurt My Feelings	Jonathan	
2025	Oh, Hi!	Steve	
2026	Bob and David Climb Machu Picchu	Himself	Documentary, also producer
2026	Lucy Schulman	TBA	Post-production

=== Television ===
Year	Title	Role	Notes
1992–1993	The Ben Stiller Show	Stage Manager / Boyfriend	2 episodes Also writer Primetime Emmy Award for Outstanding Writing for a Variety, Music or Comedy Program (1993)
1995	A Bucket of Blood	Charlie	Television film
1995–1998	Mr. Show with Bob and David	Various roles	30 episodes Also co-creator, writer and executive producer Primetime Emmy Award for Outstanding Writing for a Variety, Music or Comedy Program (1998–1999); Nominated –Primetime Emmy Award for Outstanding Music and Lyrics (1998)
1996–1997	The Drew Carey Show	Earl	2 episodes
1996–1998	NewsRadio	David / Theo	2 episodes
1997–1998	Dr. Katz, Professional Therapist	David (voice)	2 episodes
1997–2000	Tenacious D	Comic Dressed as Nun	Episode: "Angel in Disguise"; Also co-creator, writer and executive producer
1997	Space Ghost Coast to Coast	Himself	Episode: "Gallagher"
1998	Hercules	Fear (voice)	Episode: "Hercules and the Owl of Athens"
1999–2003	Just Shoot Me!	Donnie DiMauro	3 episodes
2000	Strangers with Candy	Dr. Trepanning	Episode: "Is My Daddy Crazy?"
2001	Night of the Living Doo	Himself (voice)	Television film
2001	Home Movies	Guy in Grocery Store (voice)	Episode: "Brendon's Choice"
2002–2008	Aqua Teen Hunger Force	Happy Time Harry / Bert Banana (voices)	3 episodes
2002	Never Mind the Buzzcocks	Himself	American version, panel game show, 1 episode
2003–2004	Oliver Beene	Future Oliver David Beene (voice)	23 episodes
2003	King of the Hill	Ward Rackley (voice)	Episode: "Witches of East Arlen"
2003–2004	Crank Yankers	Benjamin Dubois / Ray Shanty (voices)	2 episodes
2003–2006, 2013, 2018–2019	Arrested Development	Dr. Tobias Fünke	78 episodes Nominated–Screen Actors Guild Award for Outstanding Performance by an Ensemble in a Comedy Series (2005–2006, 2014); Nominated–Satellite Award for Best Supporting Actor – Television Series (2004)
2004	Pilot Season	Ben (voice)	2 episodes
2005	Tom Goes to the Mayor	Todd (voice)	Episode: "Calcucorn"
2005–2007	The Colbert Report	Russ Lieber	7 episodes
2006	O'Grady	Randy Harnisch (voice)	Episode: "Big Jerk on Campus"
2006	Wonder Showzen	T-Totaled Timbo / Junkyard Jessip / Storytime Hostage	3 episodes
2006	Freak Show	Benny / Primi / Various voices	7 episodes Also co-creator, writer, and executive producer
2006	Family Guy	Jerry Kirkwood (voice)	Episode: "Prick Up Your Ears"
2007–2008	Tim and Eric Awesome Show, Great Job!	Pizza Boy / James the Pussy Doodles Artist / Lou	3 episodes
2007	Law & Order: Criminal Intent	Ronnie Chase	Episode: "Bombshell"
2007	Odd Job Jack	Julius J (voice)	Episode: "King Ho"
2008	David's Situation	David	Pilot; Also co-creator and writer
2008	Human Giant	Peter Burns	2 episodes
2009	Important Things with Demetri Martin	Co-worker	Episode: "Chairs"
2009	Paid Programming		Pilot; Also co-creator
2010	Kung Fu Panda Holiday	Crane	Voice
2010–2011	Running Wilde	Dr. Andy Weeks	7 episodes
2010–2012, 2016	The Increasingly Poor Decisions of Todd Margaret	Todd Margaret	19 episodes Also creator, writer, and associate and executive producer
2011, 2018	Archer	Noah (voice)	6 episodes
2011	Soul Quest Overdrive	Bert (voice)	6 episodes
2011–2012	Modern Family	Duane Bailey	3 episodes
2012	Mary Shelley's Frankenhole	Jim Belushi / John Belushi (voices)	Episode: "Robert Louis Stevenson's Belushi"
2012–2013	Comedy Bang! Bang!	Himself / Chef	2 episodes
2013–2014	The Heart, She Holler	Jack	12 episodes
2014	Rick and Morty	Prince Nebulon (voice)	Episode: "M. Night Shaym-Aliens!"
2014	Community	Hank Hickey	Episode: "Advanced Advanced Dungeons & Dragons"
2014	Dead Boss	Derek Bridges	Pilot
2014	Maron	Himself	Episode: "Marc's Family"
2014	Drunk History	Baron von Steuben	Episode: "Philadelphia"
2015	Asylum	Juan Pablo	Episode: "Project Siren"
2015	TripTank	Jack (voice)	Episode: "Precipice of Yesterday"
2015	W/ Bob & David	Various roles	4 episodes Also co-creator, writer, and executive producer
2016–2017	Unbreakable Kimmy Schmidt	Russ Snyder	4 episodes
2016	We Bare Bears	Director (voice)	Episode: "The Audition"
2017	Pig Goat Banana Cricket	Thaddeus D. Actwell (voice)	Episode: "Steak Bus"
2018–2019	Goliath	Pete "The Broker" Oakland	6 episodes
2018	Bliss		Creator, co-writer, executive producer and director
2018	Ask the StoryBots	Hippie	Episode: "How Do Flowers Grow?"
2018	The Shivering Truth	Soldier (voice)	Episode: "Ogled Inklings"
2018	Archer	Noah (voice)	3 episodes
2019–2020	Big Mouth	Skip Glouberman (voice)	2 episodes
2021	Genius	Jerry Wexler	7 episodes
2021	What We Do in the Shadows	Dominykas the Dreadful	Episode: "A Farewell"
2021	Station Eleven	Gil	2 episodes
2021	Bubble Guppies	The Freezy Dragon (voice)	Episode: "Christmas is Coming!"
2021–2023	Teenage Euthanasia	Video Doctor (voice)	2 episodes
2023	Justified: City Primeval	Burt Dickey	2 episodes
2023	Krapopolis	Mage (voice)	Episode: "Dungeons and Deliria"
2024	The Umbrella Academy	Sy Grossman	4 episodes
2025	Elsbeth	Nolan Hurst	Episode: "Doll Day Afternoon"
2026	President Curtis	Dr. Kenny Finch (voice)	Recurring role

=== Video games ===
Year	Title	Role	Notes
2004	Halo 2	Marine (voice)	G-Phoria Award for Best Voice Male Performance
2004	Grand Theft Auto: San Andreas	Zero (voice)	
2006	Curious George	Junior (voice)	
2009	Brütal Legend	Screamwagon's tortured demon (voice)	
2020	Grand Theft Auto Online	DJ Zachary (voice)	The Cayo Perico Heist DLC
2021	Grand Theft Auto: The Trilogy - The Definitive Edition	Zero (voice)	Archival recordings Remaster of Grand Theft Auto: San Andreas only

=== Music videos ===
Year	Title	Role
1997	"Watery Hands" by Superchunk	Actor
1997	"Sugarcube" by Yo La Tengo	Actor
2004	"10 A.M. Automatic" by The Black Keys	Director
2005	"Juicebox" by The Strokes	Actor
2005	"Use It" by The New Pornographers	Actor
2006	"Vicarious" DVD by Tool	Commentary
2011	"Make Some Noise" by Beastie Boys	Actor
2024	"Can't Believe We're Here" by J Mascis	Actor

=== Podcasts ===
Year	Title	Role
2015	Harmontown	Himself
2016–2017	Homecoming	Anthony Azam
2016	Cum Town	Himself
2017	Chapo Trap House	Himself
2018	The Official Podcast	Himself
2019	What a Time to Be Alive	Himself
2020	Off Menu	Himself
2020	Life Is Short With Justin Long	Himself
2020	WTF	Himself
2021	SmartLess	Himself
2022	Useful Idiots	Himself
2022	Your Mom's House	Himself
2023	Aunty Donna Podcast	Himself
2023–present	Senses Working Overtime with David Cross	Himself
2024	Quorators	Himself
2025	Dancing Is Forbidden: An Aqua Teen Hunger Force Exploration	Himself
