= Let America Laugh =

- Directed by: Lance Bangs
- Produced by: Lance Bangs
- Starring: David Cross
- Edited by: Jeff Buchanan
- Distributed by: Sub Pop
- Release date: November 4, 2003
- Running time: 93 min.
- Country: United States
- Language: English

Let America Laugh is a 2003 documentary film produced and directed by Lance Bangs of stand-up comedian David Cross's tour of small alternative rock clubs. While it does feature small portions of Cross's stand-up routines, it consists mostly of interactions between David and the people accompanying him on tour.

Each segment on the DVD has a title taken from a Bible tract by Jack T. Chick (Is There Another Christ?, Gomez Is Coming, This Was Your Life). The DVD has several easter eggs. While on the special features menu, after idling, the disc will play phone messages. The viewer can also press up from 'Pilar Tells a Story' or down from 'Main Menu' to make Cross's glasses black, and click on for a secret feature.

== Legal case ==
In October 2005, Cross was sued by Nashville club manager Thomas Weber, accusing Cross of taping him without permission for Let America Laugh, in violation of Weber's privacy rights. In April 2006 the case against David Cross himself was dismissed, leaving Thomas Weber to face Warner Music, Sub-Pop, WEA Corporation, and the Alternative Distribution Alliance. In June, the four companies together offered Weber an 'offer of judgement' of $30,000. Weber then attempted to force each of the four companies to pay $30,000 and in the end received nothing. The case was dismissed on July 25, 2006.
