= 90 in November =

Studio album by Why Bonnie
- Released: October 14, 2022
- Genre: Indie rock
- Length: 33:32
- Label: Keeled Scales
- Producer: Tommy Reed

Professional ratings
Aggregate scores
Source	Rating
AnyDecentMusic?	7.3/10
Metacritic	74/100
Review scores
Source	Rating
AllMusic	3.5/5 stars
Loud and Quiet	8/10
God Is in the TV	8/10
Paste	8/10
Under the Radar	7.5/10 stars
Pitchfork	6.9/10

90 in November is the debut full-length album from American indie rock band Why Bonnie.

== Track listing ==
All tracks are written by Blair Howerton.

90 in November track listing
No.	Title	Length
1.	"Sailor Mouth"	3:05
2.	"Galveston"	3:22
3.	"Nowhere, LA"	3:26
4.	"Hot Car"	3:54
5.	"Silsbee"	2:45
6.	"90 In November"	3:51
7.	"Healthy"	3:14
8.	"Sharp Turn"	3:54
9.	"Lot's Wife"	2:46
10.	"Superhero"	3:15
Total length:		33:32
