= Hard Row =

Single by the Black Keys

from the album Thickfreakness
- Released: 2003 (UK)
- Genre: Garage rock, blues rock
- Length: 3:16
- Label: Fat Possum Records, Epitaph Records
- Songwriter(s): Dan Auerbach, Chuck Auerbach, Patrick Carney
- Producer(s): Patrick Carney

The Black Keys singles chronology
"Set You Free" (2003)	"Hard Row" (2003)	"Have Love Will Travel" (2003)

"Hard Row" is a single by American blues-rock duo the Black Keys from their second album Thickfreakness. The song, along with the rest of Thickfreakness, was recorded in drummer Patrick Carney's basement on a 1980 "8-track recorder". In June 2003, it peaked at No. 86 in UK Charts.

== Critical reception ==
Corey Irwin of Ultimate Classic Rock chose "Hard Row" as the best song from the album Thickfreakness, praising its "simple but effective guitar progression". Irwin favorably compared the song to the Black Keys' debut album, saying it much improved: "the vocals were crisper, the guitar bolder, the drums louder, yet all without losing that unfiltered energy of their debut effort". He felt it fused the vibes of Nirvana and ZZ Top.

Billy Saefong, writing for Music Radar, thought the song had an impressive heavy guitar riffs and a "perfectly executed" guitar solo.

Pitchfork saw "Hard Row" as a "simplified, but equally relentless version" of the previous track on the album, "Thickfreakness", describing it as thick, freaky, and "momentarily awe-inspiring".

== Track listing ==
1. Hard Row (7")
2. Evil (7")
1. Hard Row (CD)
2. Set You Free (CD)
3. Evil (CD)

== Personnel ==
- Dan Auerbach - guitars, vocals
- Patrick Carney - percussion, drums
