= Sunday Nights: The Songs of Junior Kimbrough =

Compilation album by Various artists
- Released: January 11, 2005
- Recorded: 2004
- Genre: Blues rock, garage rock
- Length: 1:07:05
- Label: Fat Possum
- Producer: Various

Professional ratings
Review scores
Source	Rating
AllMusic	4/5 stars

Sunday Nights: The Songs of Junior Kimbrough is a tribute album for the juke joint blues musician Junior Kimbrough released in January 2005. Junior Kimbrough died in 1998 following a stroke.

== Track listing ==
1. "You Better Run" [Version #1] performed by Iggy & The Stooges – 3:38
2. "Sad Days Lonely Nights" performed by Spiritualized – 5:40
3. "Meet Me in the City" performed by Blues Explosion – 4:03
4. "Done Got Old" performed by Heartless Bastards – 3:06
5. "My Mind Is Ramblin'" performed by The Black Keys – 6:51
6. "I'm Leaving" performed by Fiery Furnaces – 3:49
7. "I Feel Good Again" performed by Pete Yorn – 3:56
8. "Do the Rump" performed by Cat Power with Entrance – 3:28
9. "All Night Long" performed by Mark Lanegan – 4:18
10. "Release Me" performed by Thee Shams – 4:36
11. "Done Got Old" performed by Jim White – 2:51
12. "Lord Have Mercy on Me" performed by Outrageous Cherry – 3:05
13. "Pull Your Clothes Off" performed by Whitey Kirst – 3:45
14. "I'm in Love with You" performed by Jack Oblivian – 2:20
15. "Burn in Hell" performed by The Ponys – 6:13
16. "You Better Run" [Version #2] performed by Iggy & The Stooges – 5:26
