= Lightning Bug (band) =

Lightning Bug are an American indie rock band from New York. The band consists of Logan Miley, Kevin Copeland, Dane Hagen, and Audrey Kang.

== History ==
Lightning Bug formed in 2015 as the musical project of musician Audrey Kang. That year, they released their first full-length album titled Floaters. In 2017, Lightning Bug released a four-song EP titled The Torment of Love. In 2019, the trio released their second full-length album titled October Song. After releasing that album, they caught the attention of Mississippi-based record label Fat Possum Records, who put the record out on vinyl. In 2021, the band announced their third full-length album, A Color Of The Sky, which was released on June 25.

== Discography ==
Studio albums

- Floaters (2015, self-released)
- October Song (2019, self-released)
- A Color of the Sky (2021, Fat Possum Records)
- No Paradise (2024, self-released)

EPs

- The Torment of Love (2017, self-released)
