= School of Rock (soundtrack) =

Soundtrack album by Various artists
- Released: September 30, 2003
- Recorded: 2002
- Genres: Hard rock, heavy metal, rock and roll
- Length: 59:02
- Label: Atlantic
- Producers: Jack Black, Richard Linklater, Randall Poster, Scott Rudin

Professional ratings
Review scores
Source	Rating
AllMusic	3.5/5 stars

School of Rock is the soundtrack album of the film of the same title starring Jack Black. It was released on September 30, 2003. The film's director Richard Linklater scouted the country for talented 11-year-old musicians to play the rock music that features on the soundtrack and in the film. This is Miranda Cosgrove's music debut as she is featured with the School of Rock cast. Sammy James Jr. of the band The Mooney Suzuki penned the title track with screenwriter Mike White, and the band backs up Black and the child musicians on the soundtrack recording of the song.

== Chart performance ==
School of Rock: Original Soundtrack debuted and peaked at number ninety-five on the Billboard 200 chart in the United States. It performed better on Billboard's Top Soundtracks chart, where it reached the sixth position. In Austria, School of Rock debuted at number seventy and peaked at fifty-seven position.

== Track listing ==
No.	Title	Writer(s)	Artist	Length
1.	"School of Rock"	Mike White; Sammy James Jr.	School of Rock cast (with The Mooney Suzuki)	4:14
2.	"Your Head and Your Mind and Your Brain" (dialogue)	Mike White	Jack Black	0:36
3.	"Substitute"	Pete Townshend	The Who	3:47
4.	"Fight"	Mike White; Warren Fitzgerald	No Vacancy	2:35
5.	"Touch Me"	Robby Krieger	The Doors	3:10
6.	"I Pledge Allegiance to the Band..." (dialogue)	Mike White	Jack Black	0:49
7.	"Sunshine of Your Love"	Eric Clapton (music); Jack Bruce (music); Peter Ronald Brown (lyrics)	Cream	4:10
8.	"Immigrant Song"	Jimmy Page; Robert Plant	Led Zeppelin	2:23
9.	"Set You Free"	Dan Auerbach; Patrick Carney	The Black Keys	2:44
10.	"Edge of Seventeen"	Stevie Nicks	Stevie Nicks	5:26
11.	"Heal Me, I'm Heartsick"	Craig Wedren	No Vacancy	4:46
12.	"Growing on Me"	Justin Hawkins; Daniel Hawkins; Edward Graham; Frankie Poullain	The Darkness	3:20
13.	"Ballrooms of Mars"	Marc Bolan	T. Rex	4:08
14.	"Those Who Can't Do..." (dialogue)	Mike White	Jack Black	0:41
15.	"My Brain Is Hanging Upside Down (Bonzo Goes to Bitburg)"	Joey Ramone; Dee Dee Ramone; Jean Beauvoir	Ramones	3:53
16.	"T.V. Eye"	Iggy Pop; Scott R. Asheton; Ronald Asheton; Dave Alexander	Wylde Ratttz	5:22
17.	"It's a Long Way to the Top (If You Wanna Rock 'n' Roll)" (covering AC/DC)	Ronald Scott; Angus Young; Malcolm Young	School of Rock cast	5:51
Total length:				59:02

No Vacancy is a fictional band that features in the movie. Other songs that featured in the film but weren't included on the soundtrack album include "Black Shuck" by The Darkness, "The Wait" by Metallica, "Moonage Daydream" by David Bowie and "Mouthful of Love" by Young Heart Attack.

== Awards ==
The soundtrack was nominated for the 2004 Grammy Awards for Best Compilation Soundtrack Album for a Motion Picture, Television or Other Visual Media.

Year	Ceremony	Award	Result
2004	46th Grammy Awards	Best Compilation Soundtrack Album for a Motion Picture, Television or Other Visual Media	Nominated
2004	Teen Choice Awards	Best Soundtrack Album	Nominated

== Charts ==
Chart (2003)	Peak position
Austria (Ö3 Austrian Top 40)	57
US Billboard 200	95
US Billboard Top Soundtracks	6

== Certifications ==
Region	Certification	Certified units/sales
United Kingdom (BPI)	Gold	100,000^{‡}
^{‡} Sales+streaming figures based on certification alone.
