= John Preston Young =

American historian

- Born: April 18, 1847; Chulahoma, Marshall County, Mississippi, U.S.
- Died: June 6, 1934 (aged 87); Memphis, Tennessee, U.S.
- Education: University of Mississippi
- Occupations: Judge, historian
- Children: 2 sons, 1 daughter
- Parent: A. W. Young

John Preston Young (1847–1934) was an American Confederate veteran, judge and historian.

== Early life ==
John Preston Young was born on April 18, 1847, in Chulahoma, Mississippi. His father, Reverend A. W. Young, was a Presbyterian minister. Young was of Scotch-Irish and French descent on his paternal side. He moved to Memphis, Tennessee, with his family at the age of twelve.

Young attended the University of Mississippi in Oxford, Mississippi. In 1864, in the midst of the American Civil War, Young joined the Confederate States Army, serving under General Nathan Bedford Forrest. After the war, he returned to Ole Miss and graduated.

== Career ==
Young became a lawyer in Memphis, Tennessee, in 1872. He served as a judge on the Circuit Court from 1902 to 1923.

Young was a member of the Confederate Historical Association, later known as the West Tennessee Historical Society. He was elected as the vice president for West Tennessee of the Tennessee Historical Society in 1915. Young served as the secretary for the Forrest Monument Association in Memphis, and later served as the master of ceremonies at the Nathan Bedford Forrest monument dedication in 1905.

Young was the author of The Seventh Tennessee Cavalry (Confederate): A History, Reminiscences of the Civil War, Standard History of Memphis, etc.

Young's article entitled Hood's Failure at Spring Hill was published in the January 1908 issue of the Confederate Veteran, "the most in demand of any published after the turn of the century, probably because of Judge Young's sixteen-page article and battle map regarding that controversial subject."

== Personal life ==
Young had two sons, Garnett Young and Frazier Young, and a daughter, Lucy Young.

== Death ==
Young died on June 6, 1934, in Memphis, Tennessee.
