= Set You Free (The Black Keys song) =

Single by The Black Keys

from the album Thickfreakness and School of Rock soundtrack
- Released: 2003
- Genre: Garage rock; blues rock
- Length: 2:44
- Label: Fat Possum; Shock
- Songwriter(s): Dan Auerbach; Patrick Carney
- Producer(s): Patrick Carney

The Black Keys singles chronology
"Leavin' Trunk/She Said, She Said" (2003)	"Set You Free" (2003)	"Hard Row" (2003)

"Set You Free" is a single by American blues rock duo The Black Keys from their second album, Thickfreakness. It was recorded in Patrick Carney's basement at his old house in Akron, Ohio. The song appears in the film School of Rock (2003) and the soundtrack album, as well as in the film I Love You, Man.

== Critical reception ==
Pitchfork' Eric Carr felt "Set You Free" was the "most purely entertaining cut on the album simply out of the necessity for respite", following the two previous intense songs, through he characterized percussion as "stutter[ing]".

Complex Magazine, ranking the Black Keys songs in 2012, placed "Set You Free" at number four, but added that it was "one of the band's most popular songs to date".

== Legacy ==
Although the Black Keys had always refused to allow their music to be used for commercialism, for fear of being branded "sell-outs", they decided to license "Set You Free" for use in a Nissan advert. Dan Auerbach later said, "It's helped us immensely. Before "Tighten Up", we'd never had a real song regularly played on rock radio. We didn't have that support, and getting these songs in commercials was almost like having your song on the radio."

The track was also included on the soundtrack to the film School of Rock (2003).

== Track listing ==
All songs written by Dan Auerbach and Patrick Carney, unless otherwise noted.

1. "Set You Free"
2. "Hard Row" (lyrics by Dan and Chuck Auerbach)
3. "Evil" (previously unreleased)

== Personnel ==
- Dan Auerbach - vocals, guitars
- Patrick Carney - drums and percussion
