= Why Bonnie =

American indie rock band

- Why Bonnie playing in Madison, Wisconsin, 2026

Background information
- Origin: Austin, Texas
- Genre: Indie rock
- Years active: 2018–present
- Labels: Keeled Scales; Fire Talk
- Members: Blair Howerton; Chance Williams; Josh Malett
- Past members: Sam Houdek; Kendall Powell
- Website: www.whybonnie.com

Why Bonnie is an Americasn Indie rock band that began as a musical project of songwriter Blair Howerton. Howerton started the band in Austin, Texas and has since relocated to Brooklyn, New York. Their debut album 90 in November was released in August 2022 on Keeled Scaled . Their sophomore album Wish on the Bone is set to release on August 30, 2024, via Fire Talk Records Their musical style has been described as shoegaze-icana with pop influence.

== History ==
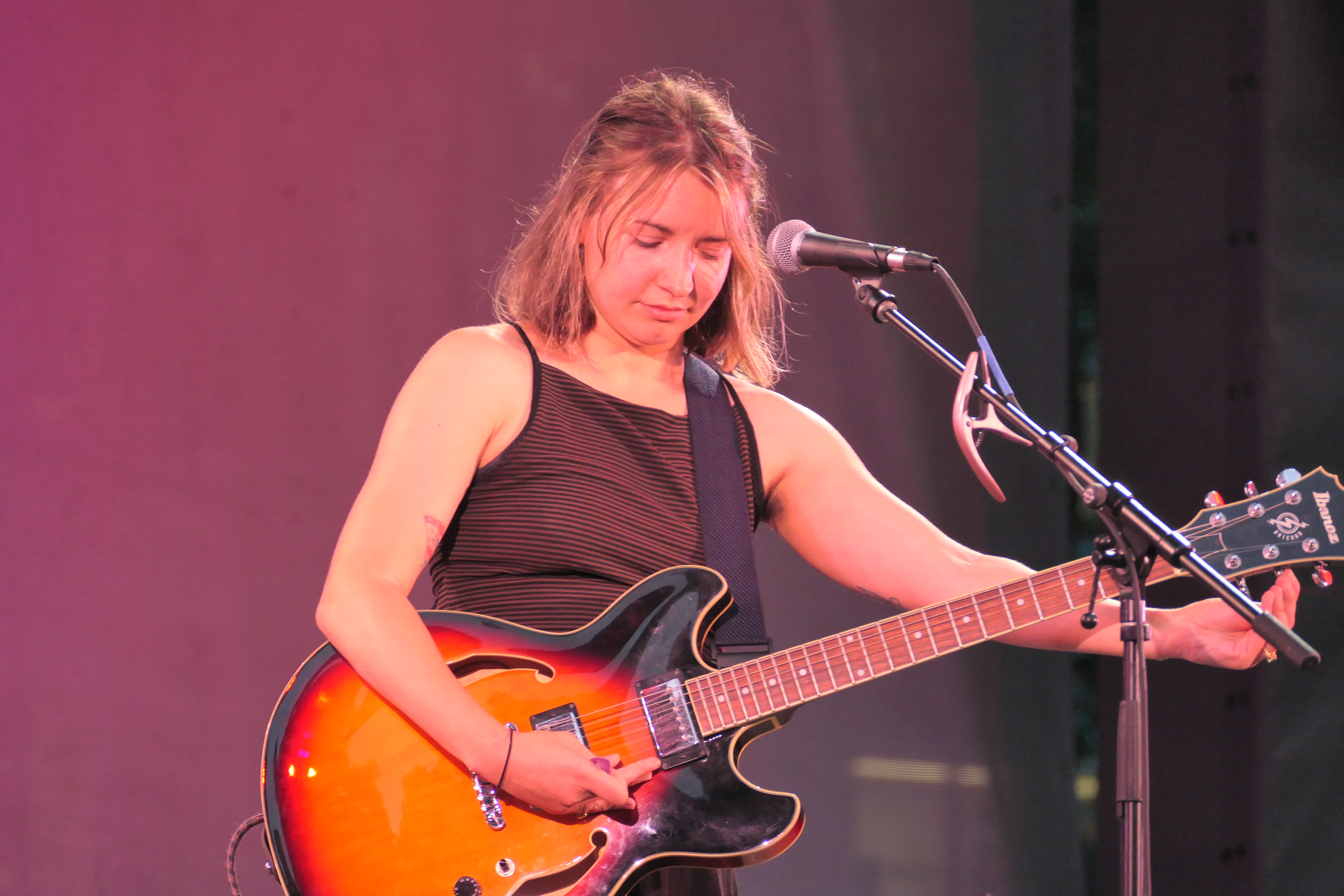
Blair Howerton at Bryant Park in 2025

Why Bonnie started as the musical project of musician Blair Howerton. However, the project expanded into a four piece for their first release, an EP in 2018 titled In Water. The EP was dedicated to Howerton's brother Bristol. The band released their second EP the same year titled Nightgown. In February 2020, the band released their first single for their new label Fat Possum Records, “Voice Box”. The band contributed to the benefit compilation The Song is Coming from Inside the House organized by Strange Ranger in light of the COVID-19 pandemic. Their third EP, sharing the name of the aforementioned single, was released in April 2020. 90 in November, the group's debut album, was released in August 2022.
