= All Night Long (Junior Kimbrough album) =

Studio album by Junior Kimbrough & the Soul Blues Boys
- Released: 1992
- Genre: Blues
- Length: 49:32
- Label: Fat Possum
- Producer: Robert Palmer

Junior Kimbrough & the Soul Blues Boys chronology
All Night Long (1992)	Sad Days, Lonely Nights (1994)

Professional ratings
Review scores
Source	Rating
AllMusic	4.5/5 stars
The Penguin Guide to Blues Recordings	2.5/4 stars

All Night Long is the second studio album recorded (but the first released) by Junior Kimbrough, released in 1992.

== Track listing ==
All songs composed by Junior Kimbrough, except "I Feel Alright", based on the song by Junior Parker.

1. "Work Me Baby" – 4:44
2. "Do the Romp" – 3:57
3. "Stay All Night" – 4:44
4. "Meet Me in the City" – 6:50
5. "You Better Run" – 7:33
6. "Done Got Old" – 2:36
7. "All Night Long" – 5:50
8. "I Feel Alright" – 4:02
9. "Nobody but You" – 5:54
10. "Slow Lightnin'" – 3:22

== Personnel ==
- Junior Kimbrough – vocals, guitar
- Garry Burnside – bass
- Kenny Malone – drums
