= John Belfour =

English orientalist and miscellaneous writer

John Belfour (c. 1768–1842), was an English orientalist and miscellaneous writer, of whom little is recorded, except that he was a member of the Royal Society of Literature, and that he died in the City Road, London, in 1842, at the age of seventy-four.

== Works ==
- Literary Fables imitated from the Spanish of Yriarte, London, 1806, 8vo.
- Spanish Heroism, or the Battle of Roncesvalles; a metrical romance, London, 1809, 8vo.
- "Music; a didactic poem from the Spanish of Yriarte", London, 1811, 8vo.
- Odes in honour of His Royal Highness the Prince Regent; with other poems, 1812; only twenty-five copies printed.
- "The Psalms of David, according to the Coptic version, accompanied by a literal translation into English, and by the version of the Latin Vulgate, with copious notes, in which the variations from the original text are noticed, the corruptions in the Egyptian text pointed out, and its numerous affinities with the Hebrew for the first time determined", 1831; manuscript in British Museum, 1110 E. 31.
- "Remarks on certain Alphabets in use among the Jews of Morocco", 1836. In the Transactions of the Royal Society of Literature of the United Kingdom, iii. 136-42, with plates.

Belfour also revised, corrected, and augmented the fifth edition of Ray's English Proverbs, London, 1813, 8vo.
