= Cuffawa Creek =

Stream in Mississippi, U.S.

Coordinates: 34.7687089°N 89.6309164°W

Cuffawa Creek is a stream in the U.S. state of Mississippi.

Cuffawa Creek is a name derived from the Choctaw language purported to mean "where the sassafras abounds".
