= Isaac H. Anderson =

American businessman, politician and publisher

- Born: 1834; Fort Valley, Georgia
- Died: 1906 (aged 71–72)
- Occupations: Businessman, grocer, politician, publisher, and religious leader

Isaac Harold Anderson (1834 – 1906) was a slave owned by his father who became a wealthy businessman, grocer, politician, publisher, and religious leader in the African American community in the U.S. state of Georgia. He was born in Fort Valley, Georgia. He was married twice. His second wife was Louise Byrd Anderson.

Anderson was elected to the state senate, but as a registrar he was deemed ineligible. Other legislators with African American heritage were kicked out of the Georgia Assembly after the 1868 election (Original 33) before a court ruling reversed the decision in 1870. Anderson was also a founding member and leader in the CME church and helped support the establishment of Lane College where he served as Vice President.

He published the Christian Index for the C.M.E. out of his Anderson Building. In 1960, the Anderson Building was used to organize sit ins by Lane College students at segregated Woolworths and McLellans lunch counters. Anderson Chapel in Holly Springs, Mississippi is named for him.
