= Robert Belfour =

American songwriter

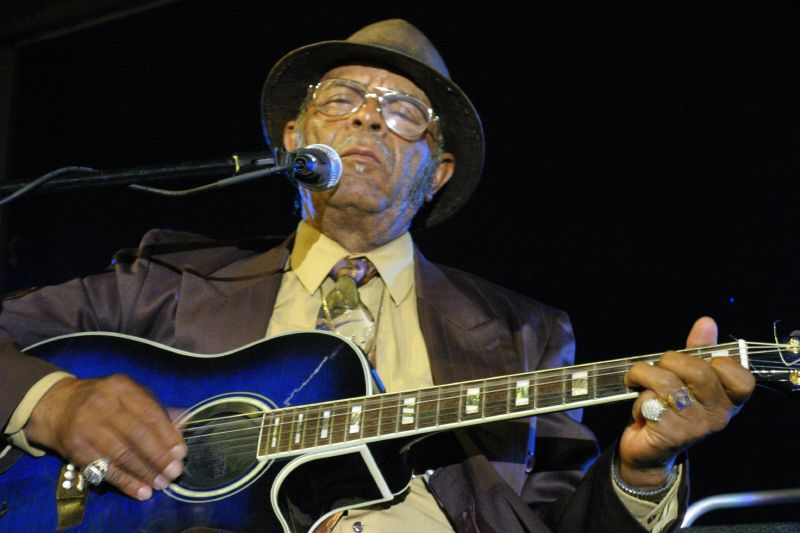
- Belfour in 2007

Background information
- Also known as: Robert "Wolfman" Belfour
- Born: September 11, 1940; Red Banks, Mississippi, United States
- Died: February 24, 2015 (aged 74) Memphis, Tennessee, United States
- Genres: Country blues
- Occupations: Guitarist, singer, songwriter
- Instrument: Guitar
- Years active: 1980s–2015
- Label: Fat Possum Records

Robert "Wolfman" Belfour (September 11, 1940 – February 24, 2015) was an American blues musician. He was born in Red Banks, Mississippi. When he was a child, his father, Grant Belfour, taught him to play the guitar, and he continued his tutelage in the blues from the musicians Otha Turner, R. L. Burnside, and Junior Kimbrough. Kimbrough, in particular, had a profound influence on him. His music was rooted in Mississippi hill country traditions, in contrast to Delta blues. His playing was characterized by a percussive attack and alternate tunings.

When Belfour was thirteen, his father died, and music was relegated to what free time he had, as his energy went to helping his mother provide for the family. In 1959, he married Noreen Norman and moved to Memphis, Tennessee, where he worked in construction for the next 35 years.

In the 1980s, Belfour began playing on Beale Street. Eight of his songs are included on the musicologist David Evans's compilation album The Spirit Lives On: Deep South Country Blues and Spirituals in the 1990s, released by the German Hot Fox label in 1994. This led Belfour to Fat Possum Records and record his first album, What's Wrong with You, released in 2000.

The album Pushin' My Luck followed in 2003, receiving a positive critical review.

Belfour died on February 24, 2015, at the age of 74. In 2015 the Killer Blues Headstone Project placed a headstone for Robert Belfour at Newell Baptist Cemetery in Red Banks, Mississippi.

== Discography ==
- 2000 What's Wrong with You
- 2003 Pushin My Luck
- 2013 Wolfman - Live at Blues Rules
