= Chulahoma, Mississippi =

- Unincorporated community
- Location within Mississippi Location within the United States
- Coordinates: 34°39′13″N 89°37′49″W
- Country: United States
- State: Mississippi
- County: Marshall
- Elevation: 479 ft (146 m)
- Time zone: UTC-6 (Central (CST))
  - Summer (DST): UTC-5 (CDT)
- Area code: 662
- GNIS feature ID: 666106

Chulahoma (also spelled as Tucklahoma) is an unincorporated community in Marshall County, Mississippi, United States. It is located in the hill country of northern Mississippi.

== History ==
Chulahoma is a name derived from the Chickasaw language meaning "red fox". The name was originally used in the name of a Chickasaw town. Chulahoma is located on Cuffawa Creek. Chulahoma was located on the Old Memphis Road and was almost chosen as the county seat of Marshall County, but lost the vote to Holly Springs.

In 1839, the Chulahoma College and Chulahoma Female Academy were incorporated by the state of Mississippi. Chulahoma was also the home of the Cold Water Baptist Female Seminary.

Chulahoma was incorporated on February 11, 1846 and disincorporated at a later date.

By 1900, Chulahoma had a population of 37 and three churches.

A post office operated under the name Chulahoma from 1838 to 1911.

Chulahoma was once home to the George Washington Chapter, Lodge 51, of the Royal Arch Masons.

During the Civil War, Company I of the 19th Mississippi Infantry Regiment enlisted at Chulahoma on May 25, 1861. Captain Richard P. Bowen commanded a company of cavalry during the Civil War that was known as the "Chulahoma Cavalry." On November 30, 1862, Chulahoma was the site of a skirmish that was part of the Union Army's Mississippi Central Railroad Campaign.

== Notable people ==
- Isaac H. Anderson, businessman and religious leader who supported the founding of Lane College
- Junior Kimbrough, Blues singer and guitarist, operated a juke joint in Chulahoma from c. 1992; following his death, Kimbrough's sons, musicians Kinney and David Malone Kimbrough, kept it open until it burned to the ground on April 6, 2000.
- John Preston Young, judge and historian
