= Shut Up You Fucking Baby! =

2002 comedy album by David Cross

Shut Up, You Fucking Baby!

Studio album by David Cross
- Released: November 5, 2002
- Recorded: 2002
- Genre: Stand-up comedy
- Length: 119:04
- Label: Sub Pop/Stand Up! Records
- Producer: Scotty Crane

David Cross chronology
Shut Up, You Fucking Baby! (2002)	It's Not Funny (2004)

Professional ratings
Review scores
Source	Rating
Allmusic	5/5 stars
Pitchfork	(6.5/10)
About.com	4.5/5 stars

Shut Up, You Fucking Baby! is a double-CD, live comedy album by David Cross, compiled mainly from shows performed in Portland, Oregon, and in Atlanta, Georgia, Cross's hometown. It was nominated for a Grammy for Best Comedy Album in 2003, but lost to "Weird Al" Yankovic's Poodle Hat. The CD was sold brand new with an obi covering the top stating the title as "Shut Up, You [lift flap for dirty word] Baby!" to accommodate stores that would object to the full title. The cover was deliberately designed to look like it has deep scratches in the cardboard of the Digipak packaging, and the tracks were given titled after clichéd stand-up comedy topics with no connection to the actual content. The album was released on CD by indie-rock label Sub Pop, and on vinyl by comedy label Stand Up! Records, which issued a limited edition of 500 triple LPs, with each respective LP pressed on red, white and blue vinyl.

== Track listing ==
=== Disc one ===
1. "Lunch with Frankenstein" – 1:31
2. "Austin Powers Saying 'Yeah Baby'" – 11:10
3. "You Go, Girl!" – 2:28
4. "Phone Call from a Cranky Terrorist" – 5:02
5. "Sex on the Internet!?" – 8:05
6. "Spider-Man vs. Batman vs. Wonder Woman on the Rag" – 4:55
7. "Shaving the Pope's Pussy" – 4:08
8. "Monica Lewinsky and the Three Bears" – 5:03
9. "Fake Tits/Real Beer" – 6:34

=== Disc two ===
1. "My Wife's Crazy!" – 3:52
2. "Flying on a Mexican Plane" – 9:40
3. "Abortion Doctor from Hell!" – 7:25
4. "Socks and Shoes" – 3:52
5. "My Daughter's First Date" – 5:15
6. "Diarrhea Moustache" – 16:03
7. "If Baseballs Had AIDS on Them" – 22:44
8. "Goodnight Assholes!" – 5:41

The first track on Disc 1 features a hidden track. The track can be heard by playing the beginning of track one and then using the rewind/search button to go back 1:40.
