= Thickfreakness =

Studio album by The Black Keys
- Released: April 8, 2003
- Recorded: December 2002
- Studio: Studio 45 (Akron, OH)
- Genre: Blues rock; garage rock
- Length: 39:01
- Label: Fat Possum
- Producer: Patrick Carney

The Black Keys chronology
The Big Come Up (2002)	Thickfreakness (2003)	Rubber Factory (2004)

Singles from Thickfreakness
- 1. "Set You Free" Released: 2002; 2. "Hard Row" Released: 2003; 3. "Have Love Will Travel" Released: 2003

Thickfreakness is the second studio album by American rock duo The Black Keys, released in 2003. It is their debut release for the Fat Possum record label, although in the UK and Europe it was co-released by Epitaph Records.

== Background ==
The band's debut album The Big Come Up had been tremendously successful for an independent rock band and Thickfreakness further increased their profile. It continues The Black Keys' tradition of raw, heavy blues-influenced garage rock.

Songs such as "Set You Free" won the pair some mainstream success as being featured in the soundtrack of the 2003 film School of Rock. Heavy comparisons to another American blues-influenced garage rock duo, The White Stripes, were often made by the music media.

== Recording ==
Most of the album was recorded in December 2002 during a single 14-hour session in Patrick Carney's basement using an early 1980s Tascam 388 8-track recorder. This approach was necessary because the group spent its small advance payment from Fat Possum Records on rent. The liner notes claim this is Carney's "patented recording technique called 'medium fidelity'". The result is a more vintage sound. Part of "Set You Free" was recorded by Jeff Saltzman.

The album included two covers: "Have Love, Will Travel" by Richard Berry and "Everywhere I Go" by north Mississippi bluesman Junior Kimbrough.

== Artwork ==
The cover art was made by Carney's brother Michael, who was responsible for the whole graphical process after the layout of The Big Come Up ended up done by Patrick Boissel of Alive Records. As the Carneys drove around Akron trying to think of an idea, they ended up in a Super K-Mart and eventually found a concept upon finding a can of Royal Crown pomade. Then they moved all of the lamps in his house into one room to light up the picture, where Patrick handled the pomade.

== Reception ==
Professional ratings
Aggregate scores
Source	Rating
Metacritic	74/100
Review scores
Source	Rating
AllMusic	4.5/5 stars
The Baltimore Sun	3/4 stars
The Boston Phoenix	3/4 stars
Houston Chronicle	4/5
Mojo	4/5 stars
Now	3/5
Pitchfork	7.7/10
Q	4/5 stars
Rolling Stone	3/5 stars
Spin	C+

Thickfreakness was The Black Keys' first breakthrough album, as it established them as an indie-rock blues band. Their recognition from Thickfreakness led them on a rigorous tour schedule including opening for singer/songwriter Beck (on his Sea Change summer tour) in the summer of 2003. According to The Boston Globe, "Thickfreakness is an album that's meant to be felt as much as heard, rigged with plunging riffs, Auerbach's charcoal-smoke singing voice, and rhythmic pockets as deep as quicksand". It was during this time that Auerbach began writing material for their next album. When the two returned from touring, Auerbach's landlord had sold his house where the duo wrote Thickfreakness in the basement.

== Track listing ==
All tracks are written by Dan Auerbach and Patrick Carney except where noted.

No.	Title	Writer(s)	Length
1.	"Thickfreakness"		3:48
2.	"Hard Row"	Dan and Chuck Auerbach (lyrics)	3:15
3.	"Set You Free"		2:46
4.	"Midnight in Her Eyes"		4:02
5.	"Have Love Will Travel"	Richard Berry	3:04
6.	"Hurt Like Mine"		3:27
7.	"Everywhere I Go"	Junior Kimbrough	5:40
8.	"No Trust"		3:37
9.	"If You See Me"		2:52
10.	"Hold Me in Your Arms"		3:19
11.	"I Cry Alone"		2:47

Japanese bonus track
No.	Title	Length
12.	"Evil"	2:27

== Personnel ==
- Dan Auerbach - guitar, vocals, bass
- Patrick Carney - drums, percussion, production

== Charts ==
Chart (2003–2004)	Peak position
Australian Albums (ARIA)	90
UK Independent Albums (OCC)	21
US Independent Albums (Billboard)	50
