= Junior Kimbrough =

American blues musician (1930–1998)

- Kimbrough in 1995

Background information
- Born: David Malone Kimbrough Jr. July 28, 1930; Hudsonville, Mississippi, United States
- Died: January 17, 1998 (aged 67) Holly Springs, Mississippi, United States
- Genres: Hill country blues, juke joint blues
- Instruments: Guitar, vocals
- Labels: Fat Possum; Capricorn Records

David Malone "Junior" Kimbrough Jr. (July 28, 1930 – January 17, 1998) was an American blues musician. His best-known works are "Keep Your Hands off Her" and "All Night Long". In 2023, he was inducted in the Blues Hall of Fame.

== Early life ==
Kimbrough was born in Hudsonville, Mississippi, and lived in the north Mississippi hill country near Holly Springs. His father, a barber, played the guitar, and Junior picked his guitar as a child. He was apparently influenced by the guitarists Mississippi Fred McDowell and Eli Green.

== Career ==
In the late 1950s Kimbrough began playing the guitar in his own style, using mid-tempo rhythms and a steady drone played with his thumb on the bass strings. This style would later be cited as a prime example of hill country blues. His music is characterized by the tricky syncopation between his droning bass strings and his midrange melodies. His soloing style has been described as modal and features languorous runs in the middle and upper registers. The result was described by music critic Robert Palmer as "hypnotic". In solo and ensemble settings it is often polyrhythmic, which links it to the music of Africa. North Mississippi bluesman and former Kimbrough bassist Eric Deaton suggested similarities between Kimbrough's music and that of Fulani musicians such as Ali Farka Touré. The music journalist Tony Russell wrote that "his raw, repetitive style suggests an archaic forebear of John Lee Hooker, a character his music shares with that of fellow North Mississippian R. L. Burnside".

In 1966, Kimbrough traveled to Memphis, Tennessee, to record for Goldwax Records, owned by the R&B and gospel producer Quinton Claunch. Claunch was a founder of Hi Records and is known as the man who gave James Carr and O.V. Wright their starts. Kimbrough recorded one session at American Studios. Claunch declined to release the recordings, deeming them too country. Some forty years later, Bruce Watson, of Big Legal Mess Records, approached Claunch to buy the original master tapes and the rights to release the recordings made that day. These songs were released by Big Legal Mess Records in 2009 as First Recordings.

Kimbrough's debut release was a cover version of Lowell Fulson's "Tramp" issued as a single on the independent label Philwood in 1967. On the label of the record his name was spelled incorrectly as Junior Kimbell, and the song "Tramp" was listed as "Tram?" The B-side was "You Can't Leave Me". Among his other early recordings are two duets with his childhood friend Charlie Feathers in 1969. Feathers counted Kimbrough as an early influence; Kimbrough gave Feathers some of his earliest lessons on the guitar.

Kimbrough recorded little in the 1970s, contributing an early version of "Meet Me in the City" to a European blues anthology. With his band, the Soul Blues Boys (then consisting of bassist George Scales and drummer Calvin Jackson), he recorded again in the 1980s for High Water, releasing a single in 1982 ("Keep Your Hands off Her" backed with "I Feel Good, Little Girl"). The label recorded a 1988 session with Kimbrough and the Soul Blues Boys (this time consisting of bassist Little Joe Ayers and drummer "Allabu Juju"), releasing it in 1997 with his 1982 single as Do the Rump! In 1987 Kimbrough made his New York debut at Lincoln Center.

== Juke Joints ==
He received notice after live footage of him playing "All Night Long" in one of his juke joints appeared in the film documentary Deep Blues: A Musical Pilgrimage to the Crossroads, directed by Robert Mugge and narrated by Robert Palmer. This performance was recorded in 1990, in the Chewalla Rib Shack, a juke joint he opened in that year east of Holly Springs to divert crowds from his packed house parties. Beginning around 1992, Kimbrough operated Junior's Place, a juke joint in Chulahoma, near Holly Springs, in a building previously used as a church.

Kimbrough came to national attention in 1992 with his debut album, All Night Long. Robert Palmer produced the album for Fat Possum, recording it in the Chulahoma joint, with Junior's son Kent "Kinney" Kimbrough (also known as Kenny Malone) on drums and R. L. Burnside's son Garry Burnside on bass guitar. The album featured many of his most celebrated songs, including the title track, the complexly melodic "Meet Me in the City," and "You Better Run", a harrowing ballad of attempted rape. All Night Long earned nearly unanimous praise from critics, receiving four stars in Rolling Stone. His joint in Chulahoma started to attract visitors from around the world, including members of U2, Keith Richards, and Iggy Pop. R. L. Burnside (who recorded for the same label) and the Burnside and Kimbrough families often collaborated on musical projects.

During the 1990s, the physical interior of Junior Kimbrough's famous juke joint in Chulahoma, Mississippi—Junior's Place—was decorated in a rainbow of paints and amateur murals, prominently including a painted reproduction of an Ebony magazine cover featuring Oprah Winfrey alongside depictions of women in Southern belle motifs and desert landscapes. Patrons entering through the door had to dodge a pool table stationed directly inside the threshold of the converted barn, and door admission was collected by a trio of local matrons who charged $2.00.

== Sophomore Release ==
A second album for Fat Possum, Sad Days, Lonely Nights, followed in 1994. A video for the album's title track featured Kimbrough, Garry Burnside and Kent Kimbrough playing in Kimbrough's juke joint. The last album he recorded, Most Things Haven't Worked Out, was released by Fat Possum in 1997. Following his death in 1998, Fat Possum released two compilation albums of recordings Kimbrough made in the 1990s, God Knows I Tried (1998) and Meet Me in the City (1999). A greatest hits compilation, You Better Run: The Essential Junior Kimbrough, followed in 2002.

== Personal life ==
Kimbrough died of a heart attack following a stroke in 1998 in Holly Springs, at the age of 67. According to Fat Possum Records, he was survived by 36 children. He is buried outside his family's church, the Kimbrough Chapel Missionary Baptist Church, near Holly Springs. The rockabilly musician Charlie Feathers (who would also die several months later), a friend of Kimbrough's, called him "the beginning and end of all music"; this tribute is written on Kimbrough's tombstone.

== Legacy ==
Fat Possum also released a tribute album, Sunday Nights: The Songs of Junior Kimbrough, in 2005, which featured Iggy & The Stooges (Kimbrough once toured with frontman Iggy Pop), the Black Keys and Mark Lanegan. The Black Keys released the EP Chulahoma: The Songs of Junior Kimbrough as well as Delta Kream, both consisting of covers of Kimbrough's songs. Sweet Tea, by Buddy Guy, is another album that borrows heavily from Kimbrough. Richard Johnston, a Kimbrough protégé, keeps this musical tradition alive with one of Junior's sons, performing live on Beale Street, in Memphis.

His sons Kinney and David Malone Kimbrough, both musicians, kept Junior's Place, which continued to attract big crowds until it burned to the ground on April 6, 2000. As of 2015, David Malone Kimbrough had a string of company- and self-published solo releases, Kent Kimbrough had one (beside sideman work), and the two have played together with their brother Robert as the Kimbrough Brothers.

== Album discography ==
- First Recordings (recorded in 1966, released in 2009)
- All Night Long (1992)
- Sad Days, Lonely Nights (1993, released 1994))
- Do the Rump! (1997)
- Most Things Haven't Worked Out (1997)
- God Knows I Tried (1998)
- Meet Me in the City (1999)
- You Better Run: The Essential Junior Kimbrough (2002)
- Introducing Junior Kimbrough (2021)

== Tribute albums ==
- Sunday Nights: The Songs of Junior Kimbrough (2005)
- The Black Keys, Chulahoma: The Songs of Junior Kimbrough (2006)

== Films ==
- Deep Blues: A Musical Pilgrimage to the Crossroads (1992)
- You See Me Laughin': The Last of the Hill Country Bluesmen (2003), released by Fat Possum Records, 2005

== See also ==
- Robert Belfour
- T-Model Ford

== Bibliography ==
- Barlow, William (1993). "Cashing In". Split Image: African Americans in the Mass Media: 31.
- Bransford, Steve (2004). "Blues in the Lower Chattahoochee Valley". Southern Spaces.
- Clarke, Donald (1995). The Rise and Fall of Popular Music. St. Martin's Press. ISBN 0-312-11573-3.
- Cohn, Lawrence (1993). Nothing But the Blues: The Music and the Musicians. Abbeville Press. ISBN 1-55859-271-7.
- Dicaire, David (1999). Blues Singers: Biographies of 50 Legendary Artists of the Early 20th Century. McFarland. ISBN 0-7864-0606-2.
- Ewen, David (1957). Panorama of American Popular Music. Prentice Hall. ISBN 0-13-648360-7.
- Ferris, Jean (1993). America's Musical Landscape. Brown & Benchmark. ISBN 0-697-12516-5.
- Garofalo, Reebee (1997). Rockin' Out: Popular Music in the USA. Allyn & Bacon. ISBN 0-205-13703-2.
- Morales, Ed (2003). The Latin Beat. Da Capo Press. ISBN 0-306-81018-2.
- Schuller, Gunther (1968). Early Jazz: Its Roots and Musical Development. Oxford University Press. ISBN 0-19-504043-0.
- Southern, Eileen (1997). The Music of Black Americans. W. W. Norton & Company. ISBN 0-393-03843-2.
- "Muslim Roots of the Blues". SFGate. http://sfgate.com/cgi-bin/article.cgi?file=/chronicle/archive/2004/08/15/INGMC85SSK1.DTL.
