= Fat Possum Records =

American independent record label

- Founded: 1992
- Founder: Matthew Johnson; Peter Redvers-Lee
- Distributor: RED Distribution (US)
- Genre: Blues, rock, hip hop, indie rock
- Country of origin: United States
- Location: Oxford, Mississippi
- Official website: www.fatpossum.com

Fat Possum Records is an American independent record label based in Water Valley and Oxford, Mississippi. At first Fat Possum focused almost entirely on recording previously unknown Mississippi blues artists (typically from Oxford or Holly Springs, Mississippi). Fat Possum has signed younger rock acts to its roster. The label has been featured in The New York Times, New Yorker, The Observer, a Sundance Channel production, features on NPR, and a 2004 documentary, You See Me Laughin. Fat Possum also distributes the Hi Records catalog.

== History ==
Fat Possum was founded in 1991 by Living Blues editor Peter Redvers-Lee, who went to the University of Mississippi for his MA studies in Journalism. He planned on starting a record label and picked the name with another student, Billy "Pup" Cochrane. Co-founder Matthew Johnson, who grew up in the state, was also a student at the University of Mississippi. By 1994 or so Lee left, and freelance recording engineer Bruce Watson assumed his managerial role. An early investor was John Hermann of Widespread Panic, who also pitched Robert Palmer's name as producer.

The label initially specialised in discovering blues players from the North Mississippi region, many of whom had never recorded before. At Fat Possum's behest some artists, particularly R. L. Burnside, released both standard blues albums and more techno albums, done in the style that would later be made famous by Moby's album Play. This led to a fair amount of controversy among blues purists, a group in which Johnson was largely uninterested. Many of the early artists for Fat Possum were picked with the aid of Palmer (previously a teacher of Johnson at the University of Mississippi), who also produced a number of records for the label.

Fat Possum’s early releases were critically acclaimed, particularly Junior Kimbrough's album All Night Long, which received 4 stars from Rolling Stone and the loud approval of Iggy Pop. In 1995, they added Arkansas bluesman John "So Blue" Weston to their roster, with So Doggone Blue (FP 1003) produced by Grammy nominee and Living Blues writer Larry Hoffman. Disputes between the artist and label resulted in Hoffman buying back the master and selling it to Evidence Records (UPC: 730182609226). Fat Possum was perennially strapped for cash. Word of mouth and artist compilations, such as Not the Same Old Blues Crap 3 (with a cover illustration by Joe Sacco) and All Men Are Liars, gradually pulled Fat Possum out of the red, even if only for brief periods of time. A legal fight with Capricorn Records, who were to be their distributor, drained Fat Possum's funds and left a number of projects on the shelf.

Burnside proved early on to be the label's biggest money maker. Having released two albums, he teamed with The Jon Spencer Blues Explosion for a tour, and then recorded with the band A Ass Pocket of Whiskey, which helped Burnside and Fat Possum gain wider recognition. A remix of the R. L. Burnside song, "It's Bad You Know", was also featured prominently on The Sopranos.

With time, many of the label's artists have died. Asie Payton, King Ernest, and Charles Caldwell died before their records could be released. Kimbrough died in 1998 and Burnside in 2005. T-Model Ford and Robert Belfour joined in the 2010s.

Responding to the first deaths, Fat Possum begun to release more archival records. George Mitchell's recordings came out first as individual albums of Furry Lewis, Mississippi Joe Callicott, R.L. Burnside, Townes Van Zandt, and others, with covers designed by Chip Kidd, and then in bulk as the George Mitchell Collection. They acquired the Al Green catalog including his 1975 Greatest Hits.

The successful band The Black Keys released their second album Thickfreakness (2003) on Fat Possum, and left the label after their third album Rubber Factory (2004). Solomon Burke's "comeback" album, Don't Give Up On Me, won the 2003 Grammy Award for Best Contemporary Blues Album. In 2013, Fat Possum released Ready To Die by Iggy and the Stooges.

Concluding that further searches for rural talent are hopeless, it has begun to broaden its base of artists and sign a range of younger, indie rock bands like Andrew Bird, Milk Music, MellowHype, the Heartless Bastards, Deadboy & the Elephantmen, Wavves, Youth Lagoon, The Walkmen, Temples, Yuck, Fat White Family, The Districts, Crocodiles, Bass Drum of Death, and Soccer Mommy. They have tapped into the indie-folk scene, releasing Verbena's frontman A.A. Bondy's solo records, The Felice Brothers, and female songwriter Lissie. In 2021, punk band Off! was signed to the label and announced that along with their upcoming fourth studio album, Fat Possum will also release their back catalog as well. In 2023, Fat Possum released Armand Hammer's We Buy Diabetic Test Strips.

In 2017 Fat Possum partnered with founding Gorilla vs. Bear blogger Chris Cantalini to start new label Luminelle Recordings. Canadian singer-songwriter Helena Deland was the label's first signing. Following Deland's signing, Fat Possum and Luminelle signed new acts such as Magdalena Bay, MUNYA, and Enumclaw.

== Artists ==
- AA Bondy
- Adult DVD
- Armand Hammer
- Courtney Marie Andrews
- Dax Riggs
- Deadboy & the Elephantmen
- The Districts
- Don Bryant
- EL-P
- Empath
- Fievel Is Glauque
- Ghais Guevara
- Haley Heynderickx
- Hand Habits
- Honeyglaze
- Joanna Sternberg
- Lightning Bug
- Man/Woman/Chainsaw
- Off!
- Songhoy Blues
- Trevor Powers
- The Weather Station
- Why Bonnie
- Wavves
- Unknown Mortal Orchestra
- X

== See also ==
- List of record labels
- Punk blues
- Category:Fat Possum Records artists
