= The Black Keys discography =

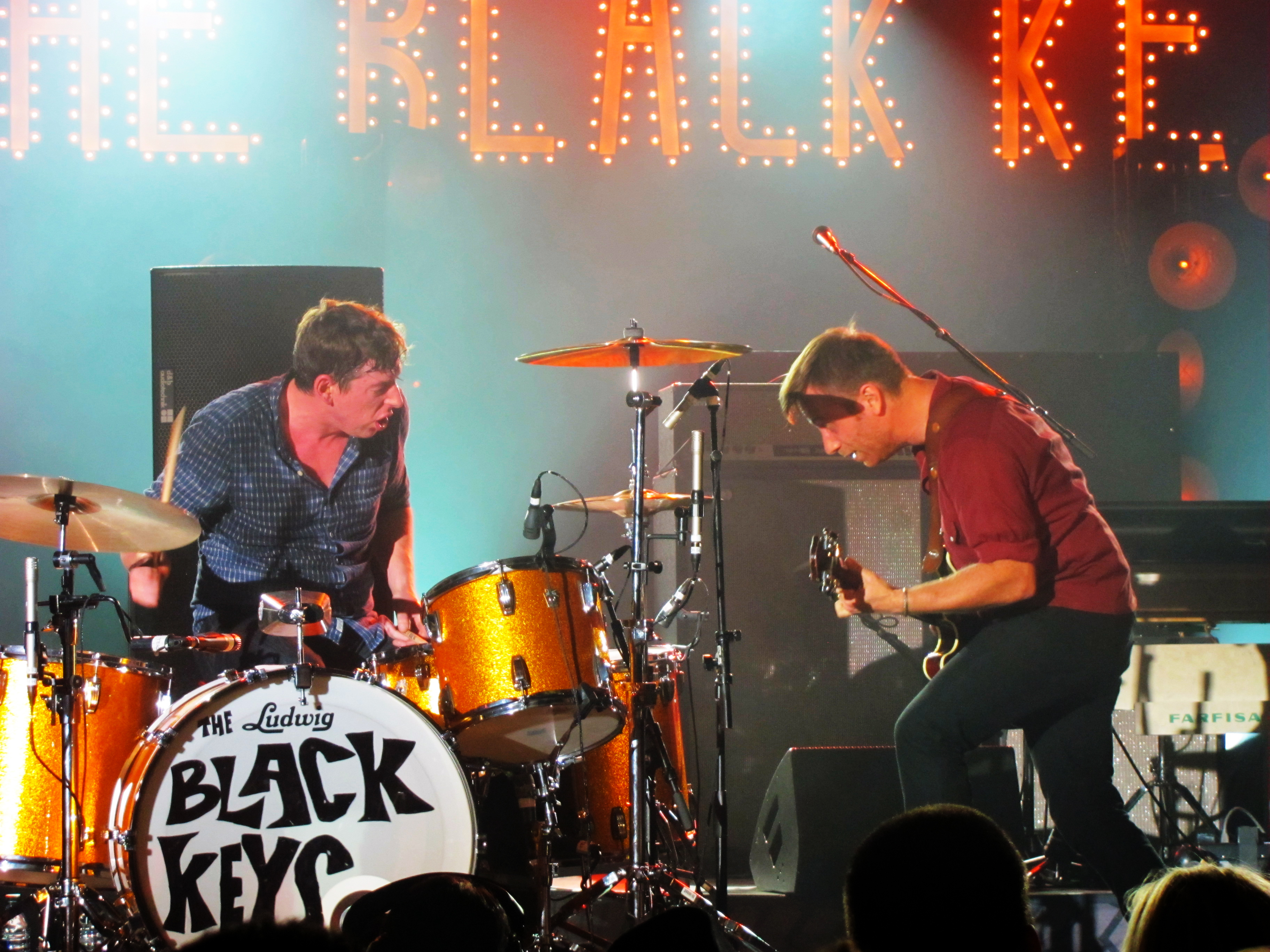
- The Black Keys performing in 2011
- Studio albums: 14
- Extended plays: 2
- Live albums: 2
- Singles: 36
- Music videos: 24

American rock duo the Black Keys have released 14 studio albums, two EPs, two live albums, 21 singles, and 22 music videos.

== Albums ==
=== Studio albums ===
Title	Album details	Peak chart positions										Sales	Certifications
Title	Album details	US	AUS	BEL	CAN	FRA	IRE	NLD	NZ	SWI	UK	Sales	Certifications
The Big Come Up	Released: May 14, 2002; Label: Alive; Formats: CD, LP, DL	—	—	—	—	—	—	—	—	—	—	US: 139,000	
Thickfreakness	Released: April 8, 2003; Label: Fat Possum; Formats: CD, LP, DL	— (Note: Thickfreakness did not enter the US Billboard 200, but peaked at number 15 on the Vinyl Albums Chart.)	90	—	—	—	—	—	—	—	182	US: 187,000	
Rubber Factory	Released: September 7, 2004; Label: Fat Possum; Formats: CD, LP, DL	131	18	—	—	123	—	—	—	—	62	US: 224,000	BPI: Silver
Magic Potion	Released: September 12, 2006; Label: Nonesuch; Formats: CD, LP, DL	95	27	99	—	109	—	—	—	—	79	US: 116,000	BPI: Silver; MC: Gold
Attack & Release	Released: April 1, 2008; Label: Nonesuch; Formats: CD, LP, DL	14	12	42	—	105	78	65	—	—	34		RIAA: Gold; BPI: Gold; MC: Gold
Brothers	Released: May 18, 2010; Label: Nonesuch; Formats: CD, LP, DL	3	8	20	4	44	46	39	10	48	29	US: 847,000; WW: 1,500,000	RIAA: 2× Platinum; BPI: Gold; MC: 4× Platinum; RMNZ: Platinum
El Camino	Released: December 6, 2011; Label: Nonesuch; Formats: CD, LP, DL	2	3	3	3	21	6	10	2	18	6	US: 1,400,000	RIAA: 2× Platinum; ARIA: 2× Platinum; BPI: Platinum; BRMA: Gold; IRMA: Platinum; MC: 6× Platinum; NVPI: Gold; RMNZ: 4× Platinum; SNEP: Platinum
Turn Blue	Released: May 12, 2014; Label: Nonesuch; Formats: CD, LP, DL	1	1	4	1	4	3	5	2	4	2	US: 457,000	RIAA: Gold; BPI: Gold; MC: Platinum; RMNZ: Gold
Let's Rock	Released: June 28, 2019; Label: Nonesuch, Easy Eye Sound; Formats: CD, LP, DL	4	4	6	4	8	10	3	5	3	3		MC: Gold
Delta Kream	Released: May 14, 2021; Label: Nonesuch, Easy Eye Sound; Formats: CD, LP, DL	6	8	2	12	6	23	2	5	3	5		
Dropout Boogie	Released: May 13, 2022; Label: Nonesuch, Easy Eye Sound; Formats: CD, LP, DL	8	35	9	8	11	33	7	6	6	5		
Ohio Players	Released: April 5, 2024; Label: Nonesuch, Easy Eye Sound; Formats: CD, LP, DL	26	68	13	35	15	43	10	18	2	13		
No Rain, No Flowers	Released: August 8, 2025; Label: Warner, Easy Eye Sound; Formats: CD, LP, DL	52	—	31	—	—	—	21	—	5	47		
Peaches!	Released: May 1, 2026; Label: Warner, Easy Eye Sound; Formats: CD, LP, DL	72	58	20	—	—	—	19	34	5	33		
"—" denotes a release that did not chart.

=== Collaboration albums ===
Title	Album details	Peak chart positions
Title	Album details	US
Blakroc	Release: November 27, 2009; Label: V2; Formats: CD, LP, DI	110

=== Bootleg albums ===
Title	Album details
Live in Austin, TX	Released: May 5, 2006; Label: Jumper Productions; Format: Bootleg

=== Live albums ===
Title	Album details
Live at Beachland Tavern March 31, 2002	Released: November 18, 2022; Label: Nonesuch Records & Easy Eye Sound; Formats: LP

=== Video albums ===
Title	Album details
Live	Released: October 4, 2005; Label: Fat Possum; Format: DVD
Thickfreakness in Austin	Released: May 5, 2006; Label: Jumper Productions; Format: DVD
Austin City Limits Music Festival 2005	Released: June 20, 2006; Label: Image Entertainment; Format: DVD
Live at the Crystal Ballroom	Released: November 18, 2008; Label: Nonesuch; Format: DVD

== Extended plays ==
Title	EP details	Peak chart positions	
Title	EP details	US	US Ind.
The Moan	Released: January 19, 2004; Label: Alive; Formats: CD, LP, DI	—	—
Chulahoma: The Songs of Junior Kimbrough	Released: May 2, 2006; Label: Fat Possum; Formats: CD, LP, DI	199	23
The Live EP	Released: 2007; Label: Mojo; Formats: DI	—	—
"—" denotes releases that did not chart.

== Singles ==
Title	Year	Peak chart positions										Certifications	Album
Title	Year	US	US Rock	AUS	BEL	CAN	FRA	IRL	NLD	NZ	UK	Certifications	Album
"The Moan"	2002	—	—	—	—	—	—	—	—	—	— (Note: "The Moan" did not enter the UK Singles Chart, but peaked at number 40 on the UK Physical Singles Chart.)		Non-album single
"Leavin' Trunk" / "She Said, She Said"	2003	—	—	—	—	—	—	—	—	—	—		The Big Come Up
"Set You Free"	2003	—	—	—	—	—	—	—	—	—	—		Thickfreakness
"Hard Row"	2003	—	—	—	—	—	—	—	—	—	86		Thickfreakness
"Have Love Will Travel"	2003	—	—	—	—	—	—	—	—	—	77		Thickfreakness
"10 A.M. Automatic"	2004	—	—	86	—	—	—	—	—	—	66		Rubber Factory
"'Till I Get My Way" / "Girl Is on My Mind"	2004	—	—	—	—	—	—	—	—	—	62		Rubber Factory
"Your Touch"	2006	—	—	—	—	—	—	—	—	—	— (Note: "Your Touch" did not enter the UK Singles Chart, but peaked at number 99 on the UK Physical Singles Chart.)		Magic Potion
"You're the One"	2007	—	—	—	—	—	—	—	—	—	—		Magic Potion
"Just Got to Be"	2007	—	—	—	—	—	—	—	—	—	— (Note: "Just Got to Be" did not enter the UK Singles Chart, but peaked at number 79 on the UK Physical Singles Chart.)		Magic Potion
"Strange Times"	2008	—	—	—	—	—	—	—	—	—	— (Note: "Strange Times" did not enter the UK Singles Chart, but peaked at number 57 on the UK Physical Singles Chart.)		Attack & Release
"I Got Mine"	2008	—	— (Note: "I Got Mine" did not enter the Hot Rock & Alternative Songs chart, but peaked at number 30 on the Heritage Rock chart.)	—	—	—	—	—	—	—	— (Note: "I Got Mine" did not enter the UK Singles Chart, but peaked at number 82 on the UK Physical Singles Chart.)	RIAA: Gold; MC: Gold	Attack & Release
"Same Old Thing"	2008	—	—	—	—	—	—	—	—	—	—		Attack & Release
"Tighten Up"	2010	87	1	—	— (Note: "Tighten Up" did not enter the Flanders Ultratop 50, but peaked at number 17 on the Ultratip chart.)	57	—	—	—	—	— (Note: "Tighten Up" did not enter the UK Singles Chart, but peaked at number 43 on the UK Physical Singles Chart.)	RIAA: Platinum; BPI: Silver; MC: 3× Platinum; RMNZ: Gold	Brothers
"Ohio"	2011	—	— (Note: "Ohio" did not enter the Rock Songs chart, but peaked at number 25 on the Rock Digital Songs chart.)	—	—	—	—	—	—	—	—		Non-album single
"Howlin' for You"	2011	— (Note: "Howlin' for You" did not enter the Billboard Hot 100, but peaked at number 16 on the Bubbling Under Hot 100 Singles chart, which acts as a 25-song extension to the Hot 100.)	5	—	—	50	—	—	—	—	—	RIAA: Platinum; BPI: Silver; MC: 6× Platinum; RMNZ: Platinum	Brothers
"Next Girl"	2011	—	—	—	—	—	—	—	—	—	—	RIAA: Gold; MC: Gold	Brothers
"Lonely Boy"	2011	64	1	2	13	33	33	40	80	7	80	RIAA: 2× Platinum; ARIA: 3× Platinum; BPI: Platinum; MC: 5× Platinum; RMNZ: 4× Platinum	El Camino
"Gold on the Ceiling"	2012	94	2	34	— (Note: "Gold on the Ceiling" did not enter the Flanders Ultratop 50, but peaked at number 2 on the Ultratip chart.)	51	—	45	—	—	57	RIAA: 2× Platinum; ARIA: Gold; BPI: Silver; MC: 4× Platinum; RMNZ: 2× Platinum	El Camino
"Little Black Submarines"	2012	— (Note: "Little Black Submarines" did not enter the Billboard Hot 100, but peaked at number 6 on the Bubbling Under Hot 100 Singles chart.)	6	—	— (Note: "Little Black Submarines" did not enter the Flanders Ultratop 50, but peaked at number 12 on the Ultratip chart.)	54	—	—	77	—	—	RIAA: Platinum; MC: 3× Platinum; RMNZ: Platinum	El Camino
"Fever"	2014	77	12	65	— (Note: "Fever" did not enter the Flanders Ultratop 50, but peaked at number 4 on the Ultratip chart.)	29	84	—	— (Note: "Fever" did not enter the Netherlands' Single Top 100 but peaked on the Netherlands' Single Tip Chart at number 19.)	—	57	RIAA: Gold; BPI: Silver; RMNZ: Gold; MC: Platinum	Turn Blue
"Turn Blue"	2014	— (Note: "Turn Blue" did not enter the Billboard Hot 100, but peaked at number 14 on the Bubbling Under Hot 100 Singles chart.)	19	—	—	92	97	—	—	—	—		Turn Blue
"Bullet in the Brain"	2014	—	—	—	— (Note: "Bullet in the Brain" did not enter the Flanders Ultratop 50, but peaked at number 33 on the Ultratip chart.)	—	—	—	—	—	—		Turn Blue
"Gotta Get Away"	2014	— (Note: "Gotta Get Away" did not enter the Billboard Hot 100, but peaked at number 97 on the US Airplay Top 100 chart.)	22	—	— (Note: "Gotta Get Away" did not enter the Flanders Ultratop 50, but peaked at number 5 on the Ultratip chart.)	93	—	—	—	—	—	MC: Gold	Turn Blue
"Weight of Love"	2015	—	24	—	—	—	84	—	—	—	—	RIAA: Gold; MC: Gold	Turn Blue
"Meet Me in the City"	2015	— (Note: "Meet Me in the City" did not enter the Billboard Hot 100, but peaked at number two on the Hot Singles Sales chart.)	—	—	—	—	—	—	—	—	— (Note: "Meet Me in the City" did not enter the UK Singles Chart, but peaked at number 33 on the UK Physical Singles Chart.)		Chulahoma: The Songs of Junior Kimbrough
"Lo/Hi"	2019	— (Note: "Lo/Hi" did not enter the Billboard Hot 100, but peaked at number 19 on the Bubbling Under Hot 100 Singles chart, which acts as a 25-song extension to the Hot 100.)	5	—	— (Note: "Lo/Hi" did not enter the Flanders Ultratop 50, but peaked at number 2 on the Ultratip chart.)	86	—	—	—	— (Note: "Lo/Hi" did not enter the New Zealand Top 40 Singles Chart, but peaked at number 23 on the New Zealand Hot Singles Chart.)	—	RIAA: Gold; MC: Platinum	Let's Rock
"Eagle Birds"	2019	—	25	—	— (Note: "Eagle Birds" did not enter the Flanders Ultratop 50, but charted as an "extra tip" on the Ultratip chart.)	—	—	—	—	—	—		Let's Rock
"Go"	2019	—	10	—	— (Note: "Go" did not enter the Flanders Ultratop 50, but peaked at number 14 on the Ultratip chart.)	—	—	—	—	—	—	MC: Gold	Let's Rock
"Shine a Little Light"	2019	—	25	—	— (Note: "Shine a Little Light" did not enter the Flanders Ultratop 50, but charted as an "extra tip" on the Ultratip chart.)	—	—	—	—	— (Note: "Shine a Little Light" did not enter the New Zealand Top 40 Singles Chart, but peaked at number 36 on the New Zealand Hot Singles Chart.)	—	MC: Gold	Let's Rock
"Crawling Kingsnake"	2021	—	31	—	— (Note: "Crawling Kingsnake" did not enter the Flanders Ultratop 50, but peaked at number 17 on the Ultratip chart.)	—	—	—	—	— (Note: "Crawling Kingsnake" did not enter the New Zealand Top 40 Singles Chart, but peaked at number 29 on the New Zealand Hot Singles Chart.)	—		Delta Kream
"Going Down South"	2021	—	—	—	— (Note: "Going Down South" did not enter the Flanders Ultratop 50, but charted as an "extra tip" on the Ultratip chart.)	—	—	—	—	—	— (Note: "Going Down South" did not enter the UK Singles Chart, but peaked at number 89 on the UK Singles Sales Chart.)		Delta Kream
"Poor Boy a Long Way from Home"	2021	—	— (Note: "Poor Boy a Long Way from Home" did not enter the Hot Rock & Alternative Songs chart, but peaked at number 17 on the Adult Alternative Airplay chart.)	—	—	—	—	—	—	— (Note: "Poor Boy a Long Way from Home" did not enter the New Zealand Top 40 Singles Chart, but peaked at number 39 on the New Zealand Hot Singles Chart.)	—		Delta Kream
"Wild Child"	2022	— (Note: "Wild Child" did not enter the US Billboard Hot 100 but peaked on the US Digital Songs chart at number 36.)	18	—	—	— (Note: "Wild Child" did not enter the Billboard Canadian Hot 100, but peaked at number 46 on the Canadian Digital Song Sales chart.)	—	—	— (Note: "Wild Child" did not enter the Netherlands' Single Top 100 but peaked on the Netherlands' Airplay Chart at number 27.)	— (Note: "Wild Child" did not enter the New Zealand Top 40 Singles Chart, but peaked at number 26 on the New Zealand Hot Singles Chart.)	— (Note: "Wild Child" did not enter the UK Singles Chart, but peaked at number 87 on the UK Singles Sales Chart.)	RIAA: Gold; MC: Platinum	Dropout Boogie
"It Ain't Over"	2022	—	— (Note: "It Ain't Over" did not enter the Hot Rock & Alternative Songs chart, but peaked at number 34 on the Rock & Alternative Airplay chart.)	—	—	—	—	—	—	—	—		Dropout Boogie
"Beautiful People (Stay High)"	2024	—	33	—	—	—	—	—	—	— (Note: "Beautiful People (Stay High)" did not enter the NZ Top 40 Singles Chart, but peaked at number 30 on the NZ Hot Singles Chart.)	— (Note: "Beautiful People (Stay High)" did not enter the UK Singles Chart, but peaked at number 83 on the UK Singles Sales Chart.)		Ohio Players
"I Forgot to Be Your Lover"	2024	—	—	—	—	—	—	—	—	—	—		Ohio Players
"This Is Nowhere"	2024	—	—	—	—	—	—	—	—	— (Note: "This Is Nowhere" did not enter the NZ Top 40 Singles Chart, but peaked at number 34 on the NZ Hot Singles Chart.)	—		Ohio Players
"The Night Before"	2025	—	41	—	—	—	—	—	—	—	—		No Rain, No Flowers
"No Rain, No Flowers"	2025	—	— (Note: "No Rain, No Flowers" did not enter the Hot Rock & Alternative Songs chart, but peaked at number 30 on the Alternative Airplay chart.)	—	—	—	—	—	—	—	—		No Rain, No Flowers
"Man on a Mission"	2025	—	— (Note: "Man On a Mission" did not enter the Hot Rock & Alternative Songs chart, but peaked at number 8 on the Adult Alternative Airplay chart.)	—	—	—	—	—	—	—	—		No Rain, No Flowers
"You Got to Lose"	2026	—	— (Note: "Man On a Mission" did not enter the Hot Rock & Alternative Songs chart, but peaked at number 2 on the Adult Alternative Airplay chart.)	—	—	—	—	—	—	—	—		Peaches!
"Where There's Smoke, There's Fire"	2026	—	—	—	—	—	—	—	—	—	—		Peaches!
"—" denotes a release that did not chart.

== Other charted and certified songs ==
Title	Year	Peak chart positions									Certifications	Album
Title	Year	US Rock	BEL	CAN Rock	CZR Rock	MEX Air.	NZ Hot	POL	UK	UK Indie	Certifications	Album
"Thickfreakness"	2003	—	—	—	—	—	—	—	— (Note: "Thickfreakness" did not enter the UK Singles Chart, but peaked at number 20 on the UK Physical Singles Chart.)	—		Thickfreakness
"Everlasting Light"	2010	—	—	—	—	—	—	—	—	—	RIAA: Gold; MC: Platinum	Brothers
"Never Gonna Give You Up"	2010	—	—	—	—	—	—	—	114	14		Brothers
"Dead and Gone"	2011	—	—	—	—	35	—	32	—	—		El Camino
"Run Right Back"	2011	—	—	—	—	37	—	—	—	—		El Camino
"The Baddest Man Alive" (with RZA)	2012	—	—	—	—	—	—	—	— (Note: "The Baddest Man Alive" did not enter the UK Singles Chart, but peaked at number 16 on the UK Physical Singles Chart.)	—		The Man with the Iron Fists
"Walk Across the Water"	2019	30	—	—	—	—	37	—	—	—		Let's Rock
"Tell Me Lies"	2019	47	—	—	—	—	—	—	—	—		Let's Rock
"Keep My Name Outta Your Mouth"	2021	— (Note: "Keep My Name Outta Your Mouth" did not enter the Hot Rock & Alternative Songs chart, but peaked at number 33 on the Adult Alternative Airplay chart.)	— (Note: "Keep My Name Outta Your Mouth" did not enter the Flanders Ultratop 50, but charted as an "extra tip" on the Ultratip chart.)	—	—	—	—	—	—	—		Brothers
"For the Love of Money"	2022	—	—	—	—	—	35	—	—	—		Dropout Boogie
"On the Game"	2024	— (Note: "On the Game" did not enter the Hot Rock & Alternative Songs chart, but peaked at number 21 on the Rock & Alternative Airplay chart.)	—	13	—	—	—	—	—	—		Ohio Players
"I'm with the Band" (featuring Beck)	2024	—	—	—	11	—	—	—	—	—		Ohio Players (Trophy Edition)
"On Repeat"	2025	—	—	—	4	—	—	—	—	—		No Rain, No Flowers
"—" denotes a release that did not chart.

== Other appearances ==
Year	Song	Artist	Album	Contribution
2006	"If You Ever Slip"	The Black Keys	The Hottest State (soundtrack)	performer
2007	"The Wicked Messenger"	The Black Keys	I'm Not There (soundtrack)	Bob Dylan cover
2007	"Can't Find My Mind"	The Black Keys	He Put the Bomp! In the Bomp	The Cramps cover
2007	"Stay All Night (Chulahoma Session)"	The Black Keys	Waxploitation Presents: Causes 1	Junior Kimbrough cover
2009	"Her Eyes Are a Blue Million Miles"	The Black Keys	Covered, A Revolution in Sound	Captain Beefheart cover
2010	"Chop and Change"	The Black Keys	The Twilight Saga: Eclipse: Original Motion Picture Soundtrack	writer and performer
2011	"Dearest"	The Black Keys	Rave On Buddy Holly	Buddy Holly cover
2012	"Wonderland"	Kesha	Warrior	instruments
2012	"The Baddest Man Alive"	The Black Keys feat. RZA	The Man with the Iron Fists OST	
2014	"Get Ur Freak On/Keep Me"	Missy Elliott & The Black Keys	Neighbors (soundtrack)	
2017	"Run that Race"	Dan Auerbach	Cars 3 soundtrack	performer

== Music videos ==
Year	Song	Director(s)
2003	"Set You Free"	Jeromy Ceseña
2004	"10 A.M. Automatic"	David Cross
2005	"Your Touch"	Peter Zavadil
2006	"Meet Me in the City"	
2007	"Just Got to Be"	Peter Zavadil
2008	"Strange Times"	Lance Bangs
2010	"Tighten Up" (Frank version)	Chris Marrs Piliero
2010	"Tighten Up"	Chris Marrs Piliero
2010	"Next Girl"	Chris Marrs Piliero
2011	"Howlin' for You"	Chris Marrs Piliero
2011	"Lonely Boy"	Jesse Dylan
2012	"Gold on the Ceiling"	Reid Long
2012	"Gold on the Ceiling" (film)	Harmony Korine
2012	"Little Black Submarines"	Danny Clinch
2012	"The Baddest Man Alive" (featuring RZA)	Chris Marrs Piliero
2014	"Fever"	Theo Wenner
2014	"Weight of Love"	Theo Wenner
2019	"Go"	Bryan Schlam
2021	"Crawling Kingsnake"	Tim Hardiman
2021	"Going Down South"	Ryan Nadzam
2021	"Stay All Night"	Ryan Nadzam
2021	"Poor Boy a Long Way From Home"	Ryan Nadzam
2022	"Wild Child"	Bryan Schlam
2024	"Beautiful People (Stay High)"	Chris Saunders
2024	"On the Game"	Robert Schober
2024	"Mi Tormenta" (featuring DannyLux)	Corey Bost
2024	"Stay In Your Grave" (featuring Alice Cooper)	Corey Bost; Ali Gomez
2024	"Sin City"	Corey Bost; Ali Gomez
2025	"The Night Before"	Running Bear
2026	"You Got To Lose"	E.J. McLeavey-Fisher
