= Turn Blue =

Turn Blue may refer to:

- "turn blue", the catchphrase of Ghoulardi
- Turn Blue (album), 2014 album by The Black Keys
  - "Turn Blue" (The Black Keys song), title track from above album
- "Turn Blue", song by Iggy Pop on Lust for Life
- "Turn Blue" (instrumental), 1965 single by Jimmy McGiff
