= Gotta Get Away (The Black Keys song) =

Single by the Black Keys

from the album Turn Blue
- Released: August 19, 2014
- Recorded: January 2013 at Key Club (Benton Harbor, Michigan)
- Genre: Garage rock; Southern rock
- Length: 3:02
- Label: Nonesuch
- Songwriters: Dan Auerbach; Patrick Carney
- Producer: The Black Keys

The Black Keys singles chronology
"Bullet in the Brain" (2014)	"Gotta Get Away" (2014)	"Weight of Love" (2015)

"Gotta Get Away" is a song by American rock band the Black Keys. It was released as the fourth single from their eighth studio album, Turn Blue, on August 19, 2014. Rolling Stone ranked the song number 24 on its list of the "50 Best Songs of 2014".

== Charts ==
=== Weekly charts ===
Weekly chart performance for "Gotta Get Away"
Chart (2014)	Peak position
Belgium (Ultratip Bubbling Under Flanders)	5
Canada Hot 100 (Billboard)	93
Canada Rock (Billboard)	1
US Hot Rock & Alternative Songs (Billboard)	22
US Rock & Alternative Airplay (Billboard)	7

=== Year-end charts ===
Year-end chart performance for "Gotta Get Away"
Chart (2014)	Position
US Hot Rock Songs (Billboard)	94
US Rock Airplay (Billboard)	34

== Certifications ==
Certifications for "Gotta Get Away"
Region	Certification	Certified units/sales
Canada (Music Canada)	Gold	40,000^{‡}
^{‡} Sales+streaming figures based on certification alone.

== Release history ==
Release dates and formats for "Gotta Get Away"
Region	Date	Format	Label	Ref.
United States	August 17, 2014	Modern rock radio	Nonesuch Records	
United States	August 18, 2014	Adult album alternative radio	Nonesuch Records	
Italy	August 22, 2014	Contemporary hit radio	Nonesuch Records	
United Kingdom	October 13, 2014	Contemporary hit radio	Nonesuch Records	
