= Crystal Ballroom =

Crystal Ballroom is a name associated with various buildings and ballrooms worldwide, including:

- Crystal Ballroom (Portland, Oregon), a historic building in Portland, Oregon, United States
- Crystal Ballroom (Melbourne), a music venue in Australia
- The ballroom of the Rice Hotel in Houston, Texas, United States
- The ballroom of the Empress Hotel in Victoria, British Columbia, Canada
- The former ballroom of Crystal Beach Park in Crystal Beach, Ontario
- Live at the Crystal Ballroom is a live DVD by The Black Keys, filmed in the Portland, Oregon Crystal Ballroom
