= Fever (The Black Keys song) =

- Artwork by Michael Carney

Single by the Black Keys

from the album Turn Blue
- B-side: "Turn Blue"
- Released: March 24, 2014
- Recorded: January 2013
- Studio: Key Club in Benton Harbor, Michigan
- Genre: Garage rock; psychedelic rock
- Length: 4:06 (album version); 3:33 (radio edit)
- Label: Nonesuch
- Songwriters: Dan Auerbach; Patrick Carney; Brian Burton
- Producers: Danger Mouse; The Black Keys

The Black Keys singles chronology
"Little Black Submarines" (2012)	"Fever" (2014)	"Turn Blue" (2014)

"Fever" is a song by American rock band the Black Keys. It was released on March 24, 2014, as the lead single from their eighth studio album, Turn Blue. On April 15, 2014, the song was released on CD with the album's title track as a B-side, along with a credit applicable to purchases of the physical formats of the album. For the 57th Annual Grammy Awards, "Fever" was nominated for Best Rock Song and Best Rock Performance.

== Recording ==
"Fever" was recorded in January 2013 at Key Club in Benton Harbor, Michigan, during the group's initial recording sessions for Turn Blue. Describing the song's origin, guitarist Dan Auerbach said, "that one started with that melody. And it was [drummer Patrick Carney] and I on our own; we recorded that song and it came pretty quickly. I had that melody in my mind, worked out what the chords were and then we kept it really simple. We kept the bass and drums simple and dancey and tried to keep it upbeat — sort of like Motown". The group worked on the song's coda with producer Danger Mouse in subsequent sessions.

== Music video ==
The music video was directed by Theo Wenner, son of Rolling Stone co-founder Jann Wenner, and was released on May 1, 2014. It features Auerbach portraying a sweaty televangelist preaching to an audience as Carney sits nearby. During the video, a phone number flashes on screen accompanied by a scrolling list of people who have donated.

The video was nominated for a 2014 MTV Video Music Award for Best Rock Video.

== Track listing ==
All tracks are written by Dan Auerbach, Patrick Carney, and Brian Burton.

CD single
No.	Title	Length
1.	"Fever"	4:06
2.	"Turn Blue"	3:43

== Personnel ==
- Dan Auerbach: vocals, guitars, bass
- Patrick Carney: drums
- Brian Burton: synthesizers

== Charts ==
=== Weekly charts ===
Weekly chart performance for "Fever"
Chart (2014)	Peak position
Australia (ARIA)	65
Belgium (Ultratip Bubbling Under Flanders)	4
Belgium (Ultratip Bubbling Under Wallonia)	16
Canada Hot 100 (Billboard)	29
Canada Rock (Billboard)	1
Finland Airplay (Radiosoittolista)	12
France (SNEP)	84
Japan Hot Overseas (Billboard)	16
Switzerland Airplay (Schweizer Hitparade)	81
UK Singles (Official Charts)	57
US Billboard Hot 100	77
US Hot Rock & Alternative Songs (Billboard)	12
US Rock & Alternative Airplay (Billboard)	1

=== Year-end charts ===
Year-end chart performance for "Fever"
Chart (2014)	Position
US Hot Rock Songs (Billboard)	24
US Rock Airplay (Billboard)	4

=== All-time charts ===
All-time chart performance for "Fever"
Chart	Position
US Adult Alternative Airplay (Billboard)	42

== Certifications ==
Cerifications for "Fever"
Region	Certification	Certified units/sales
Canada (Music Canada)	Platinum	80,000^{‡}
Italy (FIMI)	Gold	15,000^{‡}
New Zealand (RMNZ)	Gold	15,000^{‡}
United Kingdom (BPI)	Silver	200,000^{‡}
United States (RIAA)	Gold	500,000^{‡}
^{‡} Sales+streaming figures based on certification alone.

== Release history ==
Release history and formats for "Fever"
Region	Date	Format	Label	Ref.
United States	March 24, 2014	Digital download	Nonesuch Records	
United States	March 24, 2014	Active rock radio	Nonesuch Records	
United States	March 24, 2014	Adult album alternative radio	Nonesuch Records	
United States	March 24, 2014	Modern rock radio	Nonesuch Records	
Italy	August 22, 2014	Contemporary hit radio	Nonesuch Records	
United States	April 15, 2014	Compact disc	Nonesuch Records	
