= Michael Carney (artist) =

American art director (b.1982)

- Born: January 9, 1982 (age 44); Akron, Ohio
- Education: Columbus College of Art and Design
- Known for: Artist; art director; photographer
- Website: www.carneymichael.com

Michael Carney (born January 9, 1982) is an American art director, creative director, and photographer. He is best known for his extensive, award-winning visual work with the rock band The Black Keys, for whom his brother Patrick is the drummer.

== Career ==
Carney has been the art director for The Black Keys since their creation, designing all of the band's album art.

In 2011, Carney won a Grammy for Best Recording Package for his work on The Black Keys' sixth studio album, Brothers. The album cover features a simple black backdrop with the text "This is an album by the Black Keys. The name of this album is Brothers." The group's label, Nonesuch, initially expressed confusion, but eventually gave the band, and Michael, their full support of the simplistic marketing. Inside the package, the album's disc was coated with a thermal film that changes colors (black and white) at different temperatures.

Later that year, Carney was profiled in the New York Times article, "The Incredible, Inevitable Shrinking Album Cover" by David Browne.

In 2011, The Black Keys released El Camino. The album cover, designed by Carney, features a Plymouth Voyager instead of the inclined Chevrolet El Camino. According to Carney, the look for the album cover was about capturing "the spirit of doing it the wrong way."

== Personal life ==
Carney's uncle, Ralph Carney, was a multi-instrumental musician perhaps best known for his work with Tom Waits. Ralph died on December 16, 2017, after sustaining head injuries from falling down steps in his Portland, Oregon, home.

Carney's father is a retired longtime Akron Beacon Journal reporter. His mother, Mary Stormer, is an Akron Municipal Court deputy clerk. His stepfather is Barry Stormer, owner of a residential design/construction firm. His stepmother is Katie Byard Carney, also a retired longtime Beacon Journal reporter.

Carney attended Firestone High School in Akron, where he took art classes as part of the school's fine arts program. Carney graduated from the Columbus College of Art and Design.

== Work with The Black Keys ==
- The Big Come Up (2002) – art director
- Thickfreakness (2003) – art director
- Rubber Factory (2004) – art director
- Magic Potion (2006) – art director
- Attack & Release (2008) – art director
- Brothers (2010) – art director
- El Camino (2011) – art director
- Turn Blue (2014) – art director
- Let's Rock (2019) – art
- Delta Kream (2021) – art director
- Peaches! (2026) – art director

== Awards and nominations ==
=== Grammy Awards ===
Year	Nominated work	Award	Result
2011	Brothers	Best Recording Package	Won
