= Lo/Hi =

Single by The Black Keys

from the album Let's Rock
- Released: March 7, 2019
- Recorded: 2019
- Studio: Easy Eye Sound (Nashville, Tennessee)
- Genre: Garage rock; blues rock; psychedelic rock
- Length: 2:57
- Label: Nonesuch
- Songwriters: Dan Auerbach; Patrick Carney
- Producer: The Black Keys

The Black Keys singles chronology
"Weight of Love" (2015)	"Lo/Hi" (2019)	"Eagle Birds" (2019)

"Lo/Hi" is a song by the American rock band the Black Keys. It was released as the lead single from their ninth album, Let's Rock, on March 7, 2019. The song topped Billboard's Mainstream Rock, Adult Alternative Songs, Rock Airplay, and Alternative Songs charts in the United States simultaneously, making it the first song ever to do so.

== Background and recording ==
The single was the first new material by the band in nearly five years. The next day, the song was used by CBS as the theme for its promotion and coverage of the 2019 NCAA Division I men's basketball tournament along with a video of the Black Keys performing it in an airplane hangar.

The song was written by band members Dan Auerbach and Patrick Carney and was recorded in late 2018 at Easy Eye Sound in Nashville, Tennessee.

== Composition ==
David Paulson, writing for The Tennessean, described "Lo/Hi" as a "a groovy, gritty rock" and "soulful" track. He compared the track's sound to the likes of British glam rock band T. Rex. In a positive review, Althea Legaspi and Ryan Reed, writing for Rolling Stone, called Lo/Hi, as a "scorching, psychedelic" track.

Joshua Bote of NPR described "Lo/Hi" as "rich" and "gospel-style", and said it was a return to their earlier Southern/blues style as opposed to the more funk orientated previous album, Turn Blue. "The Akron, Ohio duo of Patrick Carney and Dan Auerbach built its name off chugging, crunchy Southern rock like the type dispensed on "Lo/Hi," so it's a welcome return from the gentler sounds that colored the group's last album, 2014's Turn Blue."

Jillian Mapes, writing for Pitchfork, compared the style of the song to ZZ Top, and offered a more mixed review of the song, praising the background vocals of Leisa Hans and Ashley Wilcoxson, which inject "a welcome texture", but concluded that the track was "wholly unsurprising".

== Commercial performance ==
"Lo/Hi" was the Black Keys' first top-ten song on the Hot Rock Songs chart in nearly seven years, entering at number 34 in its first week before reaching number five the second week. The song collected 2.3 million streams and 8,000 digital downloads in its first week in the United States. The song made history by topping Billboard's Mainstream Rock, Adult Alternative Songs, Rock Airplay, and Alternative Songs charts simultaneously, making it the first time any song has reached number one on all four formats at once.

== Personnel ==
The Black Keys

- Dan Auerbach – lead vocals, guitars, bass guitar, co-producer
- Patrick Carney – drums, percussion, co-producer

Additional personnel

- Leisa Hans – backing vocals
- Ashley Wilcoxson – backing vocals

Production

- Tchad Blake – mixing engineer
- Richard Dodd – mastering engineer
- M. Allen Parker – engineer
- Marc Whitmore – engineer

== Charts ==
=== Weekly charts ===
Chart (2019)	Peak position
Belgium (Ultratip Bubbling Under Flanders)	2
Belgium (Ultratip Bubbling Under Wallonia)	20
Bolivia (Monitor Latino)	11
Canada Hot 100 (Billboard)	86
Canada Rock (Billboard)	3
Czech Republic (Modern Rock)	13
New Zealand Hot Singles (RMNZ)	23
US Hot Rock & Alternative Songs (Billboard)	5
US Rock & Alternative Airplay (Billboard)	1

=== Year-end charts ===
Chart (2019)	Position
US Hot Rock Songs (Billboard)	15
US Rock Airplay Songs (Billboard)	6

== Certifications ==
Region	Certification	Certified units/sales
Canada (Music Canada)	Platinum	80,000^{‡}
United States (RIAA)	Gold	500,000^{‡}
^{‡} Sales+streaming figures based on certification alone.
