= Wild Child (The Black Keys song) =

Single by the Black Keys

from the album Dropout Boogie
- Released: March 10, 2022
- Studio: Easy Eye (Nashville, Tennessee)
- Length: 2:45
- Label: Easy Eye Sound; Nonesuch
- Songwriters: Dan Auerbach; Patrick Carney; Angelo Petraglia; Greg Cartwright
- Producer: The Black Keys

The Black Keys singles chronology
"Poor Boy a Long Way from Home" (2021)	"Wild Child" (2022)	"I Forgot to Be Your Lover" (2024)

Music video
- "Wild Child" on YouTube

"Wild Child" is a song by the Black Keys, released on March 10, 2022, as the first single from their album Dropout Boogie.

== Composition and lyrics ==
"Wild Child" is a funk track where the narrator longs for "some vaguely sketched unattainable girl", as Pitchfork critic Stuart Berman describes it.

== Critical reception ==
American Songwriter reviewer Hal Horowitz wrote the duo were "off wading into the banks of the muddy Mississippi, grinding out tough, tensile licks and gritty, committed vocals" with the track. writing for AllMusic, critic Stephen Thomas Erlewine states it "is one of the few songs that feels relatively self-contained on Dropout Boogie, as if they were consciously channeling the spirit of "Lonely Boy". "Wild Child" was nominated for Best Rock Performance at the 65th Annual Grammy Awards, but lost to "Broken Horses" by Brandi Carlile.

== Music video ==
The song's music video, directed by Bryan Schlam, shows the duo at a school, initially inside of the staffroom being roasted by the teachers and later that day, the duo quit the school, walking away from the kids while flipping them off.

== Use in WWE ==
'Wild Child" was used as the theme song for the 2024 WWE Royal Rumble premium live event.

== Credits and personnel ==
Adapted from Tidal:

Performers

- Dan Auerbach – bass, guitar, synthesizer, vocals
- Patrick Carney – drums, bass, guitar, synthesizer
- Andy Gabbard – Wurlitzer, background vocals
- Sam Bacco – percussion

Production

- The Black Keys – producer
- Jonny Ulman, McKinley James, Tyler Zwlep – assistant engineer
- Tchlad Blake, Tom Elmhirst – editor
- Caleb Buskirk, M. Allen Parker – engineer
- Greg Calbi, Steve Fallone – masterer

== Charts ==
Chart (2022)	Peak position
New Zealand Hot Singles (RMNZ)	26
US Hot Rock & Alternative Songs (Billboard)	18

== Certifications ==
Region	Certification	Certified units/sales
Canada (Music Canada)	Platinum	80,000^{‡}
United States (RIAA)	Gold	500,000^{‡}
^{‡} Sales+streaming figures based on certification alone.

== Release history ==
Release dates and formats for "Wild Child"
Region	Date	Format(s)	Label(s)	Ref.
United States	March 14, 2022	Adult alternative radio	Warner	
United States	March 15, 2022	Alternative radio	Warner	
