= Weight of Love =

Single by The Black Keys

from the album Turn Blue
- Released: January 27, 2015
- Recorded: 2013–14
- Genre: Psychedelic rock; garage rock; blues rock
- Length: 6:50 (album version); 4:33 (single edit)
- Label: Nonesuch
- Songwriters: Dan Auerbach; Patrick Carney; Brian Burton
- Producers: The Black Keys; Danger Mouse

The Black Keys singles chronology
"Gotta Get Away" (2014)	"Weight of Love" (2015)	"Lo/Hi" (2019)

"Weight of Love" is a song by American rock band The Black Keys. It was released as the fifth single from their eighth studio album Turn Blue (2014) on January 27, 2015, and is the opening track on the album.

The video for "Weight of Love" was directed by Theo Wenner. It starred Lara Stone.

== Charts ==
Chart (2014–15)	Peak position
Canada Rock (Billboard)	23
France (SNEP)	84
US Hot Rock & Alternative Songs (Billboard)	24
US Adult Alternative Airplay (Billboard)	11
US Alternative Airplay (Billboard)	16
US Rock & Alternative Airplay (Billboard)	19

== Certifications ==
Region	Certification	Certified units/sales
Canada (Music Canada)	Gold	40,000^{‡}
United States (RIAA)	Gold	500,000^{‡}
^{‡} Sales+streaming figures based on certification alone.
