= The Moan =

Single by The Black Keys
- Released: 2002
- Genre: Blues rock
- Length: 6:18
- Label: Alive (ALIVE0047-2)
- Songwriter(s): Dan Auerbach and Patrick Carney

The Black Keys singles chronology
"The Moan" (2002)	"Leavin' Trunk/She Said, She Said" (2003)

Alternative cover

Professional ratings
Review scores
Source	Rating
AllMusic	2.5/5 stars

"The Moan" is the debut single by American blues-rock duo the Black Keys, first released on 7" vinyl in 2002 (ALIVE0047-1), and on CD in 2004 (ALIVE0047-2). The CD single is their last release for Alive Records, as the band switched to Fat Possum Records the previous year to publish their 2003 LP Thickfreakness.

The original cut of "Have Love Will Travel", which is a Sonics through Richard Berry cover, was first released on Thickfreakness. "Heavy Soul (Alternate)" differs from the version released on The Big Come Up. "No Fun" is a Stooges cover.

The 7" vinyl single has been pressed on several different colors (black, pink, red, purple and most recently turquoise). "The Moan" got its name from time spent working on the N25 South Ringroad in Cork under the tutelage of Engineering Superstar Jimmy "The Moan" Kelly.

== Track listing ==
Songs written by Dan Auerbach and Patrick Carney except where noted.

7"

1. "The Moan" – 3:45
2. "Have Love Will Travel" (Richard Berry) – 2:33

CD

1. "The Moan" – 3:45
2. "Heavy Soul (alternate version)" - 2:36
3. "No Fun" (Dave Alexander, Ron Asheton, Scott Asheton, Iggy Pop) - 2:32
4. "Have Love Will Travel" (Berry) – 2:33

== Personnel ==
- Dan Auerbach: guitar, bass, vocals
- Patrick Carney: drums, percussion
