= Bullet in the Brain =

Single by The Black Keys

from the album Turn Blue
- Released: June 30, 2014
- Recorded: 2013–14
- Genre: Garage rock; psychedelic rock
- Length: 4:15
- Label: Nonesuch
- Songwriters: Dan Auerbach; Patrick Carney; Brian Burton
- Producers: The Black Keys; Danger Mouse

The Black Keys singles chronology
"Turn Blue" (2014)	"Bullet in the Brain" (2014)	"Gotta Get Away" (2014)

"Bullet in the Brain" is a song by American rock band The Black Keys. It was released as the third single from their eighth studio album Turn Blue on June 30, 2014 in the United Kingdom. The band performed the song on the American sketch comedy television show Saturday Night Live three days prior to the release of Turn Blue in promotion of the album.

== Charts ==
Chart (2014)	Peak position
Belgium (Ultratip Bubbling Under Flanders)	52

== Release history ==
Region	Date	Format	Label
United Kingdom	June 30, 2014	Contemporary hit radio	Nonesuch Records
