= Daniel Flickinger =

Audio engineer

Daniel N. Flickinger was an audio engineer in the late 1960s and 1970s, who designed and manufactured some of the era's most important music recording consoles. He designed recording consoles for Sly Stone, Curtis Mayfield, The Association, Ike Turner's Bolic Sound, Johnny Cash, and Funkadelic, Muscle Shoals Sound Studio, Cinderella Records, and United Sound Systems among many others.

Flickinger revolutionized recorded music through the sweepable EQ, an original equalization scheme. Many credit Flickinger with the first design of a working sweepable EQ, while others contend he was one of many who did important work in early EQ innovations. Either way, Flickinger's design of these EQ's would influence his circuit design, and the work of others worldwide.

== Flickinger innovations ==
- invention of the Parametric EQ.
- invention of the first recording consoles with Parametric EQ in every channel.
- development of the 'audio control surface' concept now in wide use in digital audio consoles.
- invention of remote-controlled gain devices: Remote-Gain Preamp.
- development of modular bar graph illuminated metering, known as Level Lites. Ubiquitous in consumer audio now in LED form.
- invention of the first in-line recording console
- advancement of assorted equalization schemes.

Flickinger's work has since become highly esteemed among recording professionals; Steve Albini wrote "I will go to my deathbed claiming Flickinger consoles are the best sounding mixing desks ever made. Period."

== Recording studios using Flickinger consoles ==
- Studio Black Box (Noyant-la-Gravoyère, France)
- Key Club Recording Company (Benton Harbor, Michigan)
- Sonic Pharmacy The Sonic Pharmacy acquired the Flickinger M32B console from Rock City Studios on Sept 6, 2014. (Houston, Texas)
- Montrose Recording (Richmond, Virginia)
- Cinderella Sound (Wayne Moss) (Madison, Tennessee)
- Glaser Sound Studios (Nashville Tennessee)
- Yuchen Studio (TAIPEI TAIWAN)
- Paramount Studios (Chicago, Illinois)
- Huron Street Studio (Chicago, Illinois)
