= Turn Blue (instrumental) =

Single by Jimmy McGriff

from the album Blues for Mr Jimmy
- Released: 1965
- Genre: Jazz
- Songwriter(s): Jimmy McGriff

"Turn Blue" is a 1965 single by jazz organist Jimmy McGriff. The song was a tribute to Ghoulardi's catchphrase "turn blue!". Stereo Review noted that the track sounded similar to Ray Charles' "A Fool For You". The track was reissued on the Greatest Hits album in 1968.
