= Live at the Crystal Ballroom =

Video by The Black Keys
- Released: November 18, 2008
- Recorded: Crystal Ballroom, OR
- Genre: Garage rock, blues rock
- Length: 64:00
- Label: Nonesuch
- Producer: The Black Keys

The Black Keys chronology
Live (2005)	Live at the Crystal Ballroom (2008)

Live at the Crystal Ballroom is a concert video by American rock band The Black Keys. It was released on November 18, 2008 and was produced and directed by Lance Bangs. The concert was filmed on April 4, 2008 at their show in Portland, Oregon at the Crystal Ballroom.

== Track listing ==
All songs written by Dan Auerbach and Patrick Carney.

1. "Same Old Thing"
2. "Girl Is On My Mind"
3. "Set You Free"
4. "Thickfreakness"
5. "Stack Shot Billy"
6. "Busted" (extended outro)
7. "You're the One"
8. "Remember When (Side B)"
9. "Your Touch"
10. "Oceans and Streams"
11. "Strange Times"
12. "Psychotic Girl"
13. "10 A.M. Automatic"
14. "No Trust"
15. "I Got Mine"
16. "All You Ever Wanted"
17. "'Till I Get My Way"

== Personnel ==
- Dan Auerbach – vocals, guitars
- Patrick Carney – drums, percussion, producer
