= Turn Blue (album) =

Studio album by the Black Keys
- Released: May 12, 2014
- Recorded: January 2013 – February 2014
- Studios: Sunset Sound (Hollywood); Key Club (Benton Harbor); Easy Eye Sound (Nashville, Tennessee)
- Genres: Psychedelic rock; blues rock; garage rock; soul
- Length: 45:11
- Label: Nonesuch
- Producers: Danger Mouse; The Black Keys

The Black Keys chronology
El Camino (2011)	Turn Blue (2014)	Let's Rock (2019)

Singles from Turn Blue
- 1. "Fever" b/w "Turn Blue" Released: March 24, 2014; 2. "Bullet in the Brain" Released: June 30, 2014; 3. "Gotta Get Away" Released: August 19, 2014; 4. "Weight of Love" Released: January 27, 2015

Turn Blue is the eighth studio album by American rock duo the Black Keys. It was released through Nonesuch Records on May 12, 2014, and co-produced by Danger Mouse and the duo. The record was their fourth collaboration with Danger Mouse, following their previous studio album, El Camino (2011), which was their biggest commercial and critical success to that point. For Turn Blue, Danger Mouse reprised his role from El Camino as an equal songwriting partner alongside guitarist Dan Auerbach and drummer Patrick Carney.

The Black Keys recorded the majority of Turn Blue at Sunset Sound in Hollywood, California, from July to August 2013, with additional recording taking place at Key Club in Benton Harbor, Michigan, and Auerbach's Easy Eye Sound Studio in Nashville, Tennessee, in early 2014. The sessions coincided with Auerbach's divorce from his wife, which inspired much of the album's lyrics. The resulting material was more melancholy and slower paced than the uptempo, hook-laden songs from El Camino. The album exhibits influences from psychedelic rock and soul, while also including the band's usual blues and garage rock sound. In addition to representing the record's moody tone, the title was selected as a homage to the "turn blue" catchphrase used by 1960s horror host Ghoulardi.

The band announced the album in March 2014 via a tweet by retired boxer Mike Tyson and a series of cryptic YouTube videos featuring a hypnotist. The song "Fever" was released as the lead single in March, and it charted in several countries. Four additional singles were released, including "Gotta Get Away", which was a rock radio success in North America. Turn Blue received favorable reviews from critics, many of whom commented on Danger Mouse's growing influence on the band. The album debuted at number one in the United States, Australia, and Canada, becoming the group's first record to top the charts in those countries. In May 2014, they embarked on a world tour in support of the album. At the 57th Annual Grammy Awards, Turn Blue was nominated for Best Rock Album, while "Fever" received nominations for Best Rock Performance and Best Rock Song.

== Background ==
In December 2011, the Black Keys released their seventh studio album, El Camino. It was co-produced and co-written by the band's frequent collaborator Brian "Danger Mouse" Burton, who had previously produced the group's 2008 album Attack & Release and their 2010 single "Tighten Up". El Camino comprised mostly uptempo, hook-laden tracks and featured a sound that drew from several popular genres of the 1950s–1970s, such as rock and roll, glam rock, rockabilly, surf rock and soul. The record was critically acclaimed and commercially successful, and bolstered by the popular singles "Lonely Boy", "Gold on the Ceiling", and "Little Black Submarines", it helped the group attain a new level of popularity. In the US, it debuted at number two on the Billboard 200 and sold 206,000 copies in its first week, the highest single-week sales and (to that point) charting position the group had achieved in the country. The album also reached the top five of the album charts in Australia, Canada, Belgium (Flanders), and New Zealand. Many publications, such as Rolling Stone and Time ranked El Camino among the best albums of the year. The album was certified double-platinum in Australia, Canada, and New Zealand; platinum in the US, UK, and Ireland; and gold in Belgium, the Netherlands, and France. The group's subsequent 129-date concert tour, the El Camino Tour, was their first playing arenas as a headlining act. It grossed $12.7 million in ticket sales in 2012.

Speaking about the two-and-a-half-year gap between the release of El Camino and Turn Blue, guitarist Dan Auerbach explained that the group took longer for their eighth album because they were "this-is-your-brain-on-drugs fried". The duo also spent time between records producing for artists: Auerbach worked on albums for Lana Del Rey (Ultraviolence), Dr. John (Locked Down), and Ray LaMontagne (Supernova), among others; Carney produced for Tennis.

== Writing and recording ==
The Black Keys began recording Turn Blue in January 2013 at Key Club in Benton Harbor, Michigan, during a break from their El Camino Tour. The studio had a rare Flickinger recording console custom built for Sly Stone that the band liked, and the location had been recommended by fellow rock band the Kills. For Turn Blue, just as they did for El Camino, the Black Keys entered the studio without having written any songs. Auerbach said, "Every morning we got to the studio, we'd start from scratch and by the end of the day we'd have a new song and that was really it." The group spent 12 days at Key Club, sleeping above the studio and not once leaving the building. During these sessions, "Gotta Get Away", "It's Up to You Now", and the first half of "Fever" were recorded. Carney said that while in Michigan, the group was still trying to write hooky songs like they did for El Camino: "we were still on that singles thing. I wanted [Auerbach] to let the record just breathe, and I think [he] wanted the songs to move along... There were some moments that got a little tense." Carney added, "We were kind of playing it safe. So we put the sessions on hold."

After a South American leg of touring, the band reunited with Burton in Nashville, Tennessee, for a planned two weeks of recording. However, the session ended after just one day, as Auerbach grew frustrated trying to record a vocal part and walked out. He told Carney and Burton, "I can't do this right now. I don't want to waste our time," making them wonder whether he was fit to be working. Auerbach subsequently took a vacation in North Carolina with friends.

In July 2013, the Black Keys resumed recording with Burton at Sunset Sound in Hollywood, California. They traveled to accommodate Burton, who lived in Los Angeles and had traveled for previous recording sessions with the group. Working in Studio 2, the band recorded most of Turn Blue at Sunset Sound. During the recording of the album's nearly seven-minute opening song "Weight of Love", Auerbach was urged by Carney and Burton to continue playing the track's concluding guitar solo, despite his reservations that it would be self-indulgent. He said that the song's completion set the tone for the rest of the album and that instead of focusing on radio-friendly singles, they would attempt to make a "headphone record". Carney said the month-long sessions at Sunset Sound were more inspired: "That's where the record unfolded. The record is L.A. At that point there were no rules. It's a more open, sprawling kind of album." As recording stretched into August, Auerbach finalized his divorce from Stephanie Gonis; many personal details of their separation were publicized in the press. Auerbach said that his emotional state during the divorce imbued the album with a moody feeling: "I've never relied on music to get me through anything like I did on this one. This past year, I realised how fortunate I was to have this thing I can do: making music, and lyrically, saying things that are personal."

Additional recording took place at Auerbach's Easy Eye Sound Studio in Nashville in February 2014, including all of Auerbach's vocals. According to the band, they wrote 30 songs while recording the album, but were unable to complete all of them. Carney spent about three-to-four days sequencing the album at his studio before soliciting Auerbach's input. The only change made to the running order was the addition of "Gotta Get Away" to the end; Carney had wanted "In Our Prime" to close the record, but Auerbach thought the song was too sad and preferred a catchy, upbeat track to conclude the album. Carney agreed with the change, saying, "Actually, I think it works well at the end, too. It erases your brain from whatever heavy elements there are in the record. I think maybe it encourages you to go back and listen to the record again."

== Packaging and title ==
The album title is a catchphrase used by Ghoulardi, the 1960s horror host alter-ego of Cleveland television presenter Ernie Anderson. Carney called the title "a shout-out to Ohio", the state in which he and Auerbach grew up. The title also captured the despondent tone of the record. Auerbach said, "We liked the association with Ghoulardi, this kind of weird freak from Ohio from the early 60s – that was a phrase he used to use. And then so much of the album was lyrically melancholy and introspective and personal, so it was very blue. I guess it just made sense." Carney explained the original context in which Ghoulardi used the phrase: "It's [his] way of telling people to fuck off." The cover art, which features an image of a blue and magenta spiral, was designed by Michael Carney, the group's art director and Patrick's brother. After selecting the title, Patrick said the group began "referencing early '60s sci-fi, shows like The Outer Limits and Twilight Zone" for the art direction, due to Ghoulardi's association with the genre. The album's artwork was influenced by Carney's interest in mind control; the subject drew his attention after he feuded on Twitter with fans of pop star Justin Bieber. Director Harmony Korine subsequently recommended Carney watch the 1985 film The Peanut Butter Solution, in which a teacher uses mind control on students to make them build paintbrushes. The film inspired the hypnotism wheel on the cover and in the album's promotional videos.

== Promotion ==
Turn Blue was announced on March 21, 2014, via a tweet by retired boxer Mike Tyson; the "announcement" contained the album title and a hyperlink to a series of cryptic YouTube videos featuring a hypnotist played by actor Micah Fitzgerald. The idea to have Tyson unveil the album originated after he called the band to thank them for licensing a song for use in a documentary he was making and he offered them a favor. Three days after the album announcement, the song "Fever" was released as the lead single, along with the unveiling of the album's cover art and track listing. A second song, "Turn Blue", was premiered on Carney's Sirius XM Radio program Serious Boredom on April 14. On May 5, one week prior to the release date, the album became available for streaming on iTunes Radio. The group made their third appearance on American sketch comedy television show Saturday Night Live three days prior to the album's release, performing "Fever" and "Bullet in the Brain". Other promotional appearances included performances on Live on Letterman/Late Show with David Letterman and The Colbert Report. Turn Blue was released on May 12, 2014. "Bullet in the Brain" was released as the album's third single in the United Kingdom on June 30, 2014. "Gotta Get Away" was issued to modern rock radio in the United States as the album's fourth single on August 19, 2014, while "Weight of Love" was released as the fifth single on January 27, 2015.

On May 8, the band announced the remainder of the dates for their 2014 concert tour in support of the album. The Turn Blue World Tour began with an appearance at the Hangout Music Festival on May 16, and was followed by a European leg of shows from June to July and a North American leg from September to December.

== Critical reception ==
Professional ratings
Aggregate scores
Source	Rating
Metacritic	72/100
Review scores
Source	Rating
AllMusic	4/5 stars
Chicago Tribune	3/4 stars
Entertainment Weekly	B+
The Guardian	4/5 stars
The Independent	5/5 stars
Mojo	3/5 stars
NME	6/10
Pitchfork	5.8/10
Rolling Stone	4.5/5 stars
Uncut	8/10

Turn Blue received generally favorable reviews from music critics. According to review aggregator Metacritic, the album has an average critic review score of 72/100, based on 39 reviews. Andy Gill of The Independent gave the album five stars, saying it "employs much the same formula of catchy, hook-laden melodies harnessed to tank-tread riffs that made its predecessor so irresistible". Gill praised the record's "ever-expanding diversity of appeal... that should win new fans and please the faithful." Bud Scoppa of Uncut gave the record four stars; contrasting his judgment of El Camino as a collection of "in-your-face, one-listen rockers", he called Turn Blue "largely midtempo, moody, lush in places, and deeply soulful". Scoppa opined that despite the risk in following up El Camino with "something more challenging" with "nuanced soundscapes", Turn Blue "turns out to be their sneakiest, subtlest and most seductive" album. In a four-and-a-half-star review, David Fricke of Rolling Stone called Turn Blue the "best, most consistently gripping album the Keys have ever made". In addition to praising Danger Mouse's production, Fricke was complimentary of the band for expanding its musical palette, saying the album is a "genuine turning point – into a decisively original rock, with a deeper shade of blues". Alexis Petridis of The Guardian rated the album four stars, saying that the Black Keys "have matured into a band capable of drawing all kinds of music into their own orbit" without "sound[ing] incoherent". He believed that the interplay between Auerbach and Carney was unaffected by their musical aspirations and said "the result is polished and commercial, without feeling craven or compromised, an impressive stunt to pull off."

Kyle Anderson of Entertainment Weekly gave the record a B+ and judged it to be more psychedelic than previous records by the group due to the influence of Danger Mouse; Anderson said the album "sounds more like an extension of Burton's Broken Bells side project... than the follow-up to the Keys' muscular, arena-ready 2011 best-seller, El Camino." Summarizing the album, he said, "it's meticulously executed but slightly (and sleepily) monochromatic". Keith Cameron of Mojo rated the album three stars, criticizing the release for its "diminishing returns" and believing the duo "eschewed a blank reiteration... with mixed results", but he still believed they "know which notes to hit". Barry Nicolson of NME, scoring the album a six-out-of-ten, was critical of Danger Mouse's growing influence on the band, writing "there's a nagging sense that their collaboration – beneficial though it's been for all involved – has run its course". Nicolson said that although he enjoyed parts of the album, "it's a cruel irony that the heaviest hand in Dan Auerbach's warts-and-all confessional sometimes seems to belong to his producer". Larry Fitzmaurice of Pitchfork echoed these sentiments, saying that Burton's "reign of boredom continues here in typical fashion." Fitzmaurice said the music "sounds distant and subdued, a murky-sounding collection of '70s stoner-rock facsimiles and swirling gray tones that, for the most part, are indistinguishable". The review questioned "how invested these guys actually are in the music they're making."

=== Accolades ===
Turn Blue appeared on many critics' end-of-year lists of the best albums of 2014. Rolling Stone ranked it as the third-best album of 2014, calling it "the sound of America's most innovative arena rockers in full command". Mojo placed the record 34th on its list of the "50 Best Albums of 2014". The Telegraph ranked the record the 11th-best of the year, while Q placed it at number 41 on its list. For the 57th Annual Grammy Awards, Turn Blue was nominated for Best Rock Album, while "Fever" received nominations for Best Rock Performance and Best Rock Song.

== Commercial performance ==
Turn Blue debuted at number one on the Billboard 200, selling 164,000 copies in its first week to narrowly beat Michael Jackson's posthumously released Xscape; it was the Black Keys' first number-one album in the United States. Likewise, it debuted at number one in Australia to become the group's first record there to top the album chart. In Canada, the album debuted at number one on the Canadian Albums Chart, selling 21,000 copies. As of January 2015, Turn Blue has sold 457,000 copies in the United States. The album is certified platinum in Canada and gold in the UK.

== Track listing ==
All tracks are written by Dan Auerbach, Patrick Carney, and Brian Burton except where noted.

No.	Title	Length
1.	"Weight of Love"	6:50
2.	"In Time"	4:28
3.	"Turn Blue"	3:42
4.	"Fever"	4:06
5.	"Year in Review"	3:48
6.	"Bullet in the Brain"	4:15
7.	"It's Up to You Now" (Auerbach, Carney)	3:10
8.	"Waiting on Words"	3:37
9.	"10 Lovers"	3:33
10.	"In Our Prime"	4:38
11.	"Gotta Get Away" (Auerbach, Carney)	3:02
Total length:		45:11

== Personnel ==
The Black Keys

- Dan Auerbach – vocals, guitars, bass guitar, keyboards
- Patrick Carney – drums, keyboards, percussion

Additional performers

- Brian Burton – keyboards, piano
- Regina, Ann, and Alfreda McCrary – backing vocals on "Weight of Love", "In Time", "Turn Blue", and "10 Lovers"

Production

- Danger Mouse (Brian Burton) – production (except "It's Up to You Now" and "Gotta Get Away")
- The Black Keys – production
- Kennie Takahashi – engineering
- Geoff Neal – additional engineering
- Bill Skibbe – additional engineering
- Collin Dupuis – additional engineering
- Tchad Blake – mixing
- Brian Lucey – mastering

== Charts ==
=== Weekly charts ===
Chart (2014)	Peak position
Australian Albums (ARIA)	1
Austrian Albums (Ö3 Austria)	5
Belgian Albums (Ultratop Flanders)	4
Belgian Albums (Ultratop Wallonia)	8
Canadian Albums (Billboard)	1
Danish Albums (Hitlisten)	6
Dutch Albums (Album Top 100)	5
Finnish Albums (Suomen virallinen lista)	10
French Albums (SNEP)	4
German Albums (Offizielle Top 100)	6
Greek Albums (IFPI)	7
Hungarian Albums (MAHASZ)	3
Irish Albums (IRMA)	3
Italian Albums (FIMI)	6
Japanese Albums (Oricon)	43
New Zealand Albums (RMNZ)	2
Norwegian Albums (VG-lista)	14
Polish Albums (ZPAV)	23
Scottish Albums (Official Charts)	2
Swedish Albums (Sverigetopplistan)	36
Swiss Albums (Schweizer Hitparade)	4
UK Albums (Official Charts)	2
US Billboard 200	1
US Top Alternative Albums (Billboard)	1
US Top Rock Albums (Billboard)	1

=== Year-end charts ===
Chart (2014)	Position
Australian Albums (ARIA)	72
Belgian Albums (Ultratop Wallonia)	58
Belgian Albums (Ultratop Wallonia)	100
Canadian Albums (Billboard)	20
Dutch Albums (MegaCharts)	92
French Albums (SNEP)	133
New Zealand Albums (RMNZ)	37
Swiss Albums (Schweizer Hitparade)	84
UK Albums (OCC)	69
US Billboard Alternative Albums	5
US Billboard 200	38
US Billboard Digital Albums	24
US Billboard Rock Albums	6

Chart (2015)	Position
US Billboard Rock Albums	63

== Certifications ==
Region	Certification	Certified units/sales
Canada (Music Canada)	Platinum	80,000^{^}
Canada (Music Canada) another release	Platinum	80,000^{‡}
New Zealand (RMNZ)	Gold	7,500^{‡}
United Kingdom (BPI)	Gold	100,000^{*}
United States (RIAA)	Gold	500,000^{‡}
^{*} Sales figures based on certification alone.^{^} Shipments figures based on certification alone.^{‡} Sales+streaming figures based on certification alone.
