= Key Club Recording Company =

Recording facility in Benton Harbor, MI

Coordinates: 42°06′56.9″N 86°27′26.9″W

Key Club Recording Company is a recording studio in Benton Harbor, Michigan founded by musicians and recording engineers Bill Skibbe and Jessica Ruffins in 2002. The studio has been host to such bands as The Kills, The Fiery Furnaces, The Sea and Cake, Tristeza, and others.

== History ==
After working for Steve Albini at Electrical Audio and John McEntire at Soma, Bill Skibbe alongside his spouse, Jessica Ruffins, opened Key Club Recording Company. They chose Benton Harbor because it was affordable and it allowed them the space and freedom to house artists and experiment during long sessions.

The building that houses Key Club was a boarding house for sailors in the 1880s, a lumberyard in the 1920s, and a coffee house that hosted folk artists called Unicorn Key Club in the 1960s, which gave the recording studio its name. It later housed a locksmith before being used for Key Club Recording Company.

In January 2013, The Black Keys recorded tracks for their album Turn Blue at the studio after The Kills suggested using it.

== Console ==
Key Club's mixing console is a custom Flickinger N-32 Matrix originally built for Sly Stone. The console was installed in Stone's Bel Air mansion in 1970, in time to record his hit record There's a Riot Goin' On. Later albums, Fresh and Small Talk, were also tracked on the console. It was purchased by Skibbe from Paragon Studios in Chicago.
