= Leavin' Trunk/She Said, She Said =

EP by The Black Keys
- Released: 10 February 2003
- Genre: Blues rock
- Length: 5:24
- Label: Isota Records

The Black Keys chronology
| Thickfreakness (2003) | Leavin' Trunk/She Said, She Said (2003) | The Moan (2004) |

Leavin' Trunk/She Said, She Said is a limited edition vinyl single by The Black Keys. It was released on the independent label, Isota Records - only 1,000 hand-numbered copies were produced. The two songs were pressed onto a clear vinyl record, and the hand-printed slip cover included a photograph of a child with birds. The artwork was designed by Nat Russell.

== Track listing ==
1. "Leavin' Trunk" (traditional) - 2:55
2. "She Said, She Said" (Lennon–McCartney) - 2:29

== Personnel ==
- Dan Auerbach: guitar, vocals
- Patrick Carney: drums
