= The Big Come Up =

Studio album by the Black Keys
- Released: May 14, 2002
- Recorded: January–March 2002
- Studio: Synth Etiquette Analog Sound (Akron, Ohio)
- Genres: Blues rock; punk blues; garage rock
- Length: 54:15 (CD); 35:49 (LP)
- Label: Alive
- Producer: Patrick Carney

The Black Keys chronology
The Big Come Up (2002)	Thickfreakness (2003)

Singles from The Big Come Up
- 1. "Leavin' Trunk" Released: 2003; 2. "She Said, She Said" Released: 2003

Professional ratings
Review scores
Source	Rating
AllMusic	4/5 stars
The Encyclopedia of Popular Music	3/5 stars
Regina Leader-Post	4.5/5 stars
Robert Christgau	(3-star Honorable Mention)
Rolling Stone	4/5 stars
Spin	8/10

The Big Come Up is the debut studio album by the American rock duo the Black Keys, released on May 14, 2002, on Alive Records.

== Background and recording ==
The album was created in Akron, Ohio, also known as the Rubber City. As band members Dan Auerbach and Patrick Carney began to grow up, they realized that rubber companies, such as Goodyear, were a dying industry. They knew they were not guaranteed an automatic job by achieving a college degree, so the two dropped out of college to pursue their musical career. They began producing The Big Come Up in their basement. Carney and Auerbach recorded the album in Carney's basement, using two microphones bought off eBay. They recorded their album on a 16-track digital recorder. The record contains thirteen songs. Nine of them are original tracks, with five cover songs. "240 Years Before Your Time", the closing track, becomes silent at about 1:39 into the track on the CD version. This silence lasts until 21:41.

== Release ==
The Big Come Up was released through Alive Records on May 14, 2002. Alive re-presses this album regularly, often several times a year on different colored vinyl or with altered sleeve artwork. These are usually marketed as limited editions. They have released the album on vinyl on at least 14 separate occasions, opening themselves up to criticism, particularly in regard to the marketing term "limited edition".

The band also released an EP that included covers of the blues song "Leaving' Trunk" and the Beatles' song "She Said, She Said". The song "I'll Be Your Man" was used as the theme song for the HBO series Hung; it also appeared in the FX series Rescue Me.

== Reception ==
According to Nielsen Soundscan, the album sold around 139,000 copies. The two did not make much money from the album, so they had trouble paying for a tour. Therefore, they raised money by mowing lawns for their landlord. Although the album sold poorly, it gained a cult following and attracted critics. In 2005 music critic Chuck Klosterman singled out The Big Come Up as one of 21 "high-quality albums" from the previous three years. As the two blues-rock musicians began to gain attention, they caught the eye of American Independent record label, Fat Possum Records. Fat Possum Records quietly released blues music that drew inspiration from the gritty country blues guitar rhythms and from artists like Junior Kimbrough, one of Carney and Auerbach's leading inspirations.

== Track listing ==
=== CD version ===
All tracks are written by Auerbach and Carney except where noted.

No.	Title	Writer(s)	Length
1.	"Busted"	R.L. Burnside	2:34
2.	"Do the Rump"	Junior Kimbrough	2:38
3.	"I'll Be Your Man"		2:21
4.	"Countdown"		2:39
5.	"The Breaks"		3:01
6.	"Run Me Down"		2:27
7.	"Leavin' Trunk"	Sleepy John Estes	3:00
8.	"Heavy Soul"		2:09
9.	"She Said, She Said"	John Lennon, Paul McCartney	2:32
10.	"Them Eyes"		2:23
11.	"Yearnin'"		1:59
12.	"Brooklyn Bound"		3:11
13.	"240 Years Before Your Time"		23:21
Total length:			54:15

=== Vinyl version ===
Side A
No.	Title	Writer(s)	Length
1.	"Busted"	R.L. Burnside	2:33
2.	"Do the Rump"	Junior Kimbrough	2:37
3.	"I'll Be Your Man"		2:20
4.	"Countdown"		2:38
5.	"The Breaks"		3:02
6.	"Run Me Down"		2:27
7.	"She Said, She Said" (alternate version)	John Lennon, Paul McCartney	2:32

Side B
No.	Title	Writer(s)	Length
1.	"Heavy Soul" (alternate version)		2:08
2.	"Yearnin'" (alternate version)		1:58
3.	"No Fun" (vinyl exclusive)	The Stooges	2:33
4.	"Them Eyes"		2:23
5.	"Leavin' Trunk"	Traditional	3:00
6.	"Brooklyn Bound"		3:11
7.	"240 Years Before Your Time"		2:27

== Personnel ==
The Black Keys

- Dan Auerbach – electric guitar, vocals, bass, 12 string guitar, slide guitar
- Patrick Carney – drums, tambourine, maracas, beats, sampler, production
- Gabe Fulvimar – Moog bass on "She Said, She Said", "Heavy Soul", "The Breaks", and "Countdown"

Production

- Patrick Boissel – album cover design
- Michael Carney – album cover design, photography
- Dave Schultz – mastering
