= Poor Boy Blues =

Song performed by Bo Weavil Jackson

Single by Gus Cannon as "Banjo Joe"
- B-side: "Can You Blame the Colored Man"
- Released: 1927
- Recorded: 1927
- Genre: Blues
- Label: Paramount
- Songwriter(s): Traditional

"Poor Boy Blues", or "Poor Boy, Long Ways From Home", is a traditional blues song that has been cited as one of the oldest in the genre. As with most traditional blues songs, there is great variation in the melody and lyrical content as performed by different artists. However, there is often a core verse containing some variation of the line "I'm a poor boy a long way from home."

Blues historian Gérard Herzhaft described it as:

much a part of black folklore as it is of white folklore, and its origin is quite questionable. It is probably an old English piece revised by Appalachian musicians. Strangely enough, "Poor Boy", after decades of being a standard refrain, especially in country music, resurfaced among postwar bluesmen.

The song is often associated with a slide guitar accompaniment. Gus Cannon recalled hearing a slide guitarist named Alec or Alex Lee in Coahoma County around 1900, playing a version of the song. In 1927, Cannon recorded the song under the pseudonym Banjo Joe for Paramount Records. He performed the piece using a slide on a five string banjo, with guitar accompaniment by Blind Blake.

A version recorded by Howlin' Wolf in 1957 is described by Herzhaft as "a sensational rendering". Chess Records issued it as a single, with another traditional song, "Sitting on Top of the World" as the second side.
