= Turn Blue (The Black Keys song) =

Single by The Black Keys

from the album Turn Blue
- A-side: "Fever"
- Released: March 24, 2014
- Recorded: 2013–2014
- Genre: Psychedelic rock; blues rock; soul; garage rock
- Length: 3:43
- Label: Nonesuch
- Songwriters: Dan Auerbach; Patrick Carney; Brian Burton
- Producers: Danger Mouse; The Black Keys

The Black Keys singles chronology
"Fever" (2014)	"Turn Blue" (2014)	"Bullet in the Brain" (2014)

"Turn Blue" is a song by American rock band The Black Keys, and the title track from their album Turn Blue. It was co-written and co-produced by the band and Danger Mouse.

The song was written in February 2013 while The Black Keys frontman Dan Auerbach and his wife Stephanie Gonis were in the midst of divorce proceedings.

== Track listing ==
1. "Turn Blue" - 3:43

== Charts ==
Chart (2014)	Peak position
France (SNEP)	97
US Bubbling Under Hot 100 (Billboard)	14
US Hot Rock & Alternative Songs (Billboard)	22

== Release history ==
Region	Date	Format	Label
United States	April 15, 2014	Digital download	Nonesuch Records
