= The Black Keys =

American rock duo

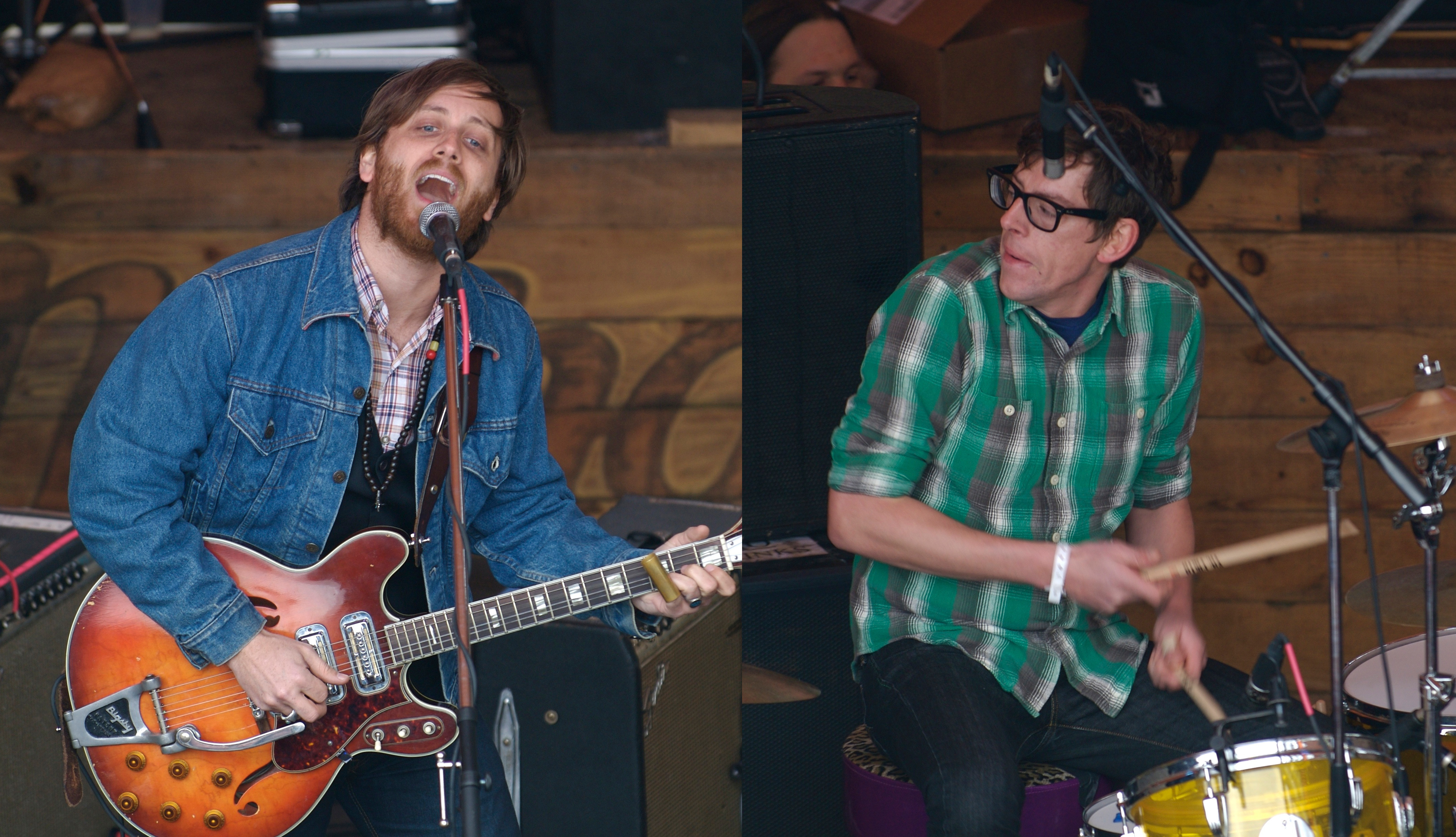
- The Black Keys performing at South by Southwest in 2010. From left to right: Dan Auerbach and Patrick Carney.

Background information
- Origin: Akron, Ohio, U.S.
- Genres: Garage rock; blues rock; punk blues; indie rock
- Years active: 2001–present
- Labels: Easy Eye Sound; Nonesuch; Alive; Fat Possum; V2
- Members: Dan Auerbach; Patrick Carney
- Website: theblackkeys.com

The Black Keys are an American rock duo formed in Akron, Ohio, in 2001. The group consists of Dan Auerbach (guitar, vocals) and Patrick Carney (drums). The duo began as an independent act, recording music in basements and self-producing their records, before they eventually emerged as one of the most popular garage rock artists during a second wave of the genre's revival in the 2000s. The band's raw blues rock sound draws heavily from Auerbach's blues influences, including Junior Kimbrough, R.L. Burnside, Howlin' Wolf, and Robert Johnson.

Friends since childhood, Auerbach and Carney formed the group after dropping out of college. After signing with the independent record label Alive, they released their debut album, The Big Come Up, in 2002, which earned them a new deal with Fat Possum Records. Over the next decade, the Black Keys built an underground fanbase through extensive touring of small clubs, frequent album releases and music festival appearances, and broad licensing of their songs. Their third album, Rubber Factory (2004), received critical acclaim and boosted the band's profile, eventually leading to a record deal with the major label Nonesuch Records in 2006. After self-producing and recording their first four records in makeshift studios, the duo recorded Attack & Release (2008) in a professional studio and hired producer Danger Mouse, who subsequently became a frequent collaborator of the group.

The group's commercial breakthrough came in 2010 with the album Brothers, which along with its popular single "Tighten Up", won three Grammy Awards. Their 2011 follow-up El Camino received critical acclaim and peaked at number two on the Billboard 200 chart, leading to the first arena concert tour of the band's career, the El Camino Tour. The album and its hit single "Lonely Boy" won another three Grammy Awards. In 2014, they released their eighth album, Turn Blue, their first number-one record in the US, Canada, and Australia. After completing the Turn Blue Tour in 2015, the duo took a hiatus for several years to work on side projects and produce other artists.

The duo returned in 2019 with their ninth album, Let's Rock. In 2021, they released Delta Kream, a tribute to Mississippi hill country blues. Returning to original songwriting, Dropout Boogie was released in 2022. In 2024, they released Ohio Players; following that they released No Rain, No Flowers on August 8, 2025. In 2026 their fourteenth album Peaches! was released.

== History ==
=== Early history ===
Guitarist and vocalist Dan Auerbach and drummer Patrick Carney first met when they were nine years old and were casual friends while living in the same neighborhood of Akron, Ohio, a couple of houses down from each other. Auerbach and Carney both come from musical backgrounds. Auerbach is the cousin of guitarist Robert Quine, a "veteran of New York's avant-rock scene." Carney is the nephew of saxophonist Ralph Carney, who performed on several Tom Waits albums. While attending Firestone High School, they became friends again, though they were part of different crowds—Auerbach was captain of the high school soccer team, while Carney was a social outcast. Encouraged by their brothers, the duo began jamming together in 1996, as Auerbach was learning guitar at the time and Carney owned a four-track recorder and a drum set. After graduating, both briefly attended the University of Akron before dropping out.

=== Formation, The Big Come Up, and Thickfreakness (2001–2003) ===
Auerbach attempted to make a living from performing at small bars in town, but realized he would not be able to book shows in other cities without a demo. To record one, he asked for help from Carney, who agreed to provide recording equipment and allow his basement to be used if Auerbach recruited the other musicians. However, none of Auerbach's backing band showed up on the recording date. Instead, Carney and Auerbach jammed, eventually leading to the duo forming a band in mid-2001. Together, they recorded a six-song demo consisting of "old blues rip-offs and words made up on the spot" with minimal equipment. After sending the demo to a dozen record labels, they accepted an offer in 2002 from a small indie label in Los Angeles named Alive, because it was "the only label that would sign [them] without having to see [them] first".

The group's name "the Black Keys" came from an acquaintance diagnosed with schizophrenia, Alfred McMoore. He would leave incoherent messages on their answering machines referring to their fathers as "black keys" such as "D flat" when he was upset with them. On March 20, 2002, the duo played their first live show at Cleveland's Beachland Ballroom and Tavern to an audience of approximately eight people. The band's debut album, The Big Come Up, was recorded entirely in Carney's basement on an 8-track tape recorder in lo-fi and was released in May 2002, three months after they signed to Alive. The album, a mix of eight original tracks and five cover songs, forged a raw blues rock sound for the group; the covers included tracks originally by blues musicians Muddy Waters, Junior Kimbrough, and R. L. Burnside. Two tracks, covers of the traditional blues standard "Leavin' Trunk" and the Beatles' song "She Said, She Said", were released as a single on Isota Records. The track "I'll Be Your Man" would later be used as the theme song for the HBO series Hung. In order to help fund a tour, Auerbach and Carney took jobs mowing lawns for a landlord. Despite modest sales for The Big Come Up, it gained a cult following and attracted attention from critics, eventually landing the group a record deal with Fat Possum Records.

Within days of signing to Fat Possum, the Black Keys completed their second album, Thickfreakness. It was recorded in Carney's basement in a single 14-hour session in December 2002, an approach necessitated because the group spent its small advance payment from Fat Possum on rent. The group had recorded sessions with producer Jeff Saltzman in San Francisco but ultimately aborted them, as they were unhappy that the results sounded too much like "modern-rock radio". In March 2003, the group played at one of its first music festivals, South by Southwest in Austin, Texas, after driving for nearly 24 hours from Akron. Much as they did for the festival, Carney and Auerbach spent their early tour days driving themselves from show to show in a 1994 Chrysler van they nicknamed the "Gray Ghost".

Thickfreakness was released on April 8, 2003, and received positive reviews from critics. The record spawned three singles: "Set You Free", "Hard Row", and a cover of Richard Berry's "Have Love, Will Travel". The other cover from the album was Junior Kimbrough's "Everywhere I Go". Time later named Thickfreakness the third-best album of 2003. That year, the duo received an offer of $100,000 to do a mayonnaise advertisement, which they rejected. The band toured extensively throughout 2003, playing its first dates outside of the United States and opening concerts for Sleater-Kinney, Beck, and Dashboard Confessional. However, exhaustion had set in by the end of the year, forcing the band to cancel European tour dates. In August, the group made its national television debut on Late Night with Conan O'Brien and performed at the Reading and Leeds Festivals. As fellow garage band the White Stripes grew in popularity, the Black Keys drew comparisons to them—sometimes as a derivative act—since both groups had two-piece lineups, Midwest origins, bluesy sounds, and names with colors. In September, the Black Keys released a split-EP with the Six Parts Seven titled The Six Parts Seven/The Black Keys EP, featuring one song by the Six Parts Seven and three songs by the Black Keys.

=== Rubber Factory, Magic Potion, and other releases (2004–2007) ===
The Black Keys released an EP titled The Moan on January 19, 2004, featuring "Have Love Will Travel", an alternate version of "Heavy Soul", and two covers. The group found itself struggling to sell records or gain airplay of their songs on the radio, and they were not making much money either; they had to absorb a $3,000 loss from a European tour. Frustrated with their lack of success, the band relented and decided to begin licensing their music, beginning with the song "Set You Free" in a Nissan automobile commercial. It was the first of an eventual 300-plus song placements in television shows, films, TV commercials, and video games. The group played several high-profile musical festivals in the first half of 2004, including Coachella and Bonnaroo.

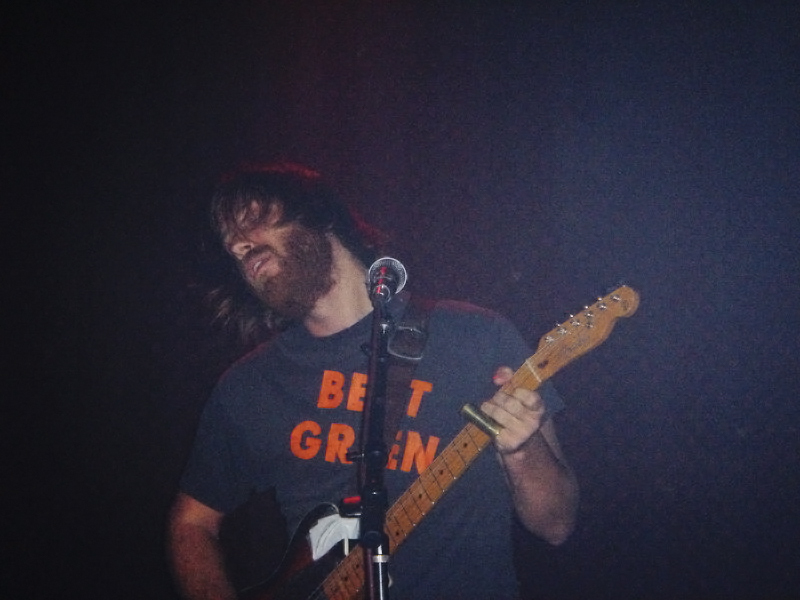
Auerbach with the Black Keys in May 2005

For their third album, Rubber Factory, the band was forced to find a new recording location, as the building that housed their basement studio was sold by its landlord. They created a makeshift studio in a former tire-manufacturing factory in Akron, and recorded from January to May 2004. The album was released on September 7, 2004, and became the group's first record to chart on the US Billboard 200, reaching number 143. Rubber Factory received critical acclaim and was named one of the year's best albums by Entertainment Weekly and The New Yorker. Two singles were released, "10 A.M. Automatic" and the double A-side "'Till I Get My Way/Girl Is on My Mind". Comedian David Cross directed the music video for "10 A.M. Automatic". The duo promoted the album with tours in North America, Europe, and Australia. In 2005, the band released their first live video album, Live, recorded at The Metro Theatre in Sydney, Australia on March 18, 2005. In July, they played at the Lollapalooza music festival.

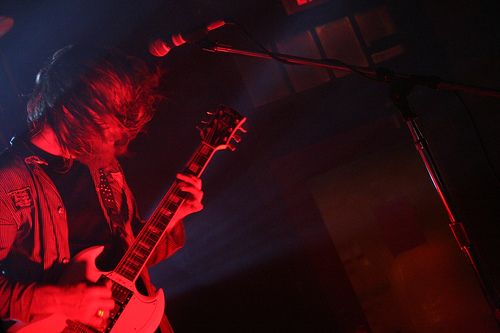
Auerbach with the Black Keys in December 2006

On May 2, 2006, the Black Keys released Chulahoma: The Songs of Junior Kimbrough, a 6-track album of cover versions of songs by Junior Kimbrough. It was the band's final release with the independent label Fat Possum. Having fulfilled their two-album contract, the band signed with the major label Nonesuch Records. Later in May, the group released its second live album, Live in Austin, TX—also known as Thickfreakness in Austin—which was recorded in 2003. The group's music appeared in several television commercials over the course of the year; among the companies to license its music were Sony, Nissan, and Victoria's Secret, which used "The Desperate Man" in a lingerie commercial featuring Heidi Klum. Despite having the resources of a major record label available to them, the group elected to return to recording in Carney's basement for its fourth studio album, Magic Potion. Released on September 12, 2006, the album was the group's first release on Nonesuch, as well as its first album to comprise all original songs. Three singles were issued: "You're the One", "Your Touch", and "Just Got to Be". In support of Magic Potion, the band embarked on its largest tour to that point, performing in large theaters and 1,000-seat venues. The Black Keys recorded covers of "The Wicked Messenger" for the soundtrack of the film I'm Not There and "If You Ever Slip" for The Hottest State soundtrack.

=== Attack & Release and side projects (2007–2009) ===
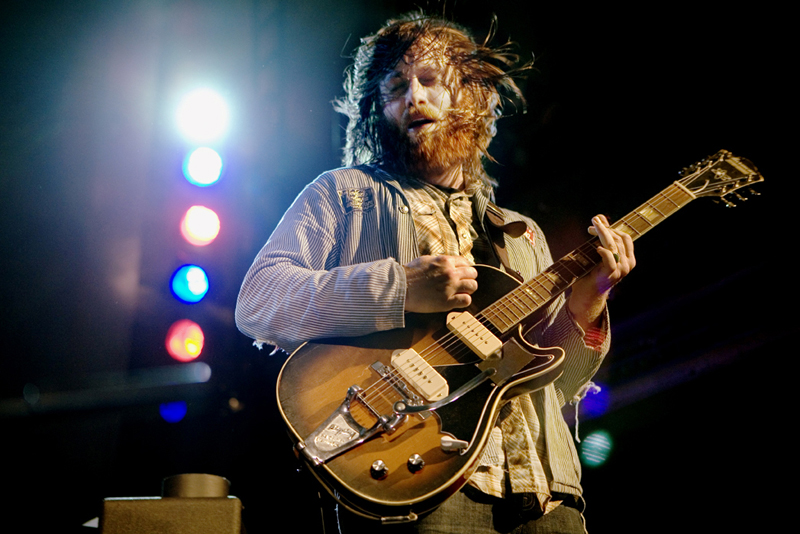
Auerbach performing with the Black Keys in East London in March 2008

In 2007, producer Danger Mouse began working on a record for Ike Turner and asked the Black Keys to write a few songs for the project. The collaboration ultimately fell through, and Turner later died in December 2007. The duo decided to turn the material they had written into their fifth studio album, Attack & Release, and they asked Danger Mouse to produce the record. The sessions saw the band transitioning away from their "homemade" ethos to record-making; not only was it the first time that the band completed an album in a professional studio, but it was also the first time they hired an outside producer to work on a record. Danger Mouse supplemented the band's sound with instrumental flourishes and more polished production values. Released on April 1, 2008, Attack & Release debuted at number 14 on the Billboard 200. Four singles were released: "Strange Times", "I Got Mine", "Oceans and Streams", and "Same Old Thing". "Strange Times" was featured in the video games Grand Theft Auto IV and NASCAR 09. "I Got Mine" is used as the theme song for Canadian police drama TV series The Bridge. The song was ranked number 23 on Rolling Stone's list of The 100 Best Singles of 2008.

On October 17, 2008, the Black Keys was an opening act for fellow Akron-area band Devo at a special benefit concert at the Akron Civic Theatre for presidential candidate Barack Obama. Chrissie Hynde of the Pretenders, also an Akron native and Firestone High School graduate, followed their set. In November, they toured through Europe together with Liam Finn. That month, the group released the concert video Live at the Crystal Ballroom, which was filmed on April 4, 2008, at the group's show at Crystal Ballroom in Portland, Oregon. The video was produced by Lance Bangs.

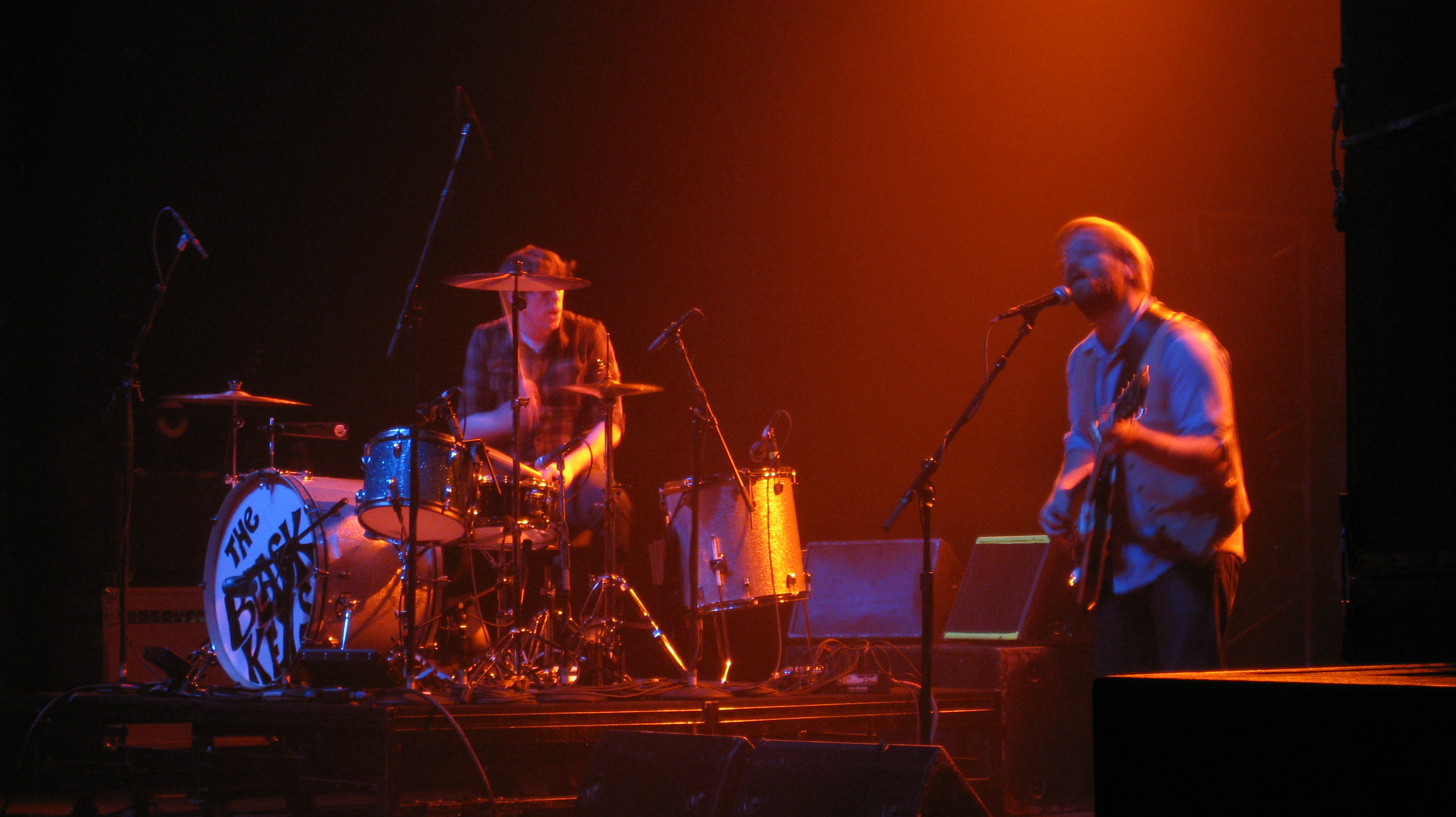
The Black Keys performing at The Agora in January 2009

Tensions grew within the band in 2009. Prior to Carney's divorce from his wife Denise Grollmus, Auerbach found it increasingly difficult to communicate with the drummer due to his antipathy for Grollmus. Auerbach said, "I really hated her from the start and didn't want anything to do with her." In February, Auerbach released his debut solo album, Keep It Hid. Carney, who claimed Auerbach did not tell him about the side project, felt betrayed. Carney subsequently formed the indie band Drummer, with whom he played bass guitar. The group released its debut album Feel Good Together on September 29, 2009.

The Black Keys reconciled later in the year. On June 6, 2009, they performed along with the Roots, TV on the Radio, Public Enemy, Antibalas, and other acts at the 2nd Annual Roots Picnic on the Festival Pier in Philadelphia. They also joined the 9th annual Independent Music Awards judging panel to assist independent musicians' careers.

Blakroc, a collaborative album featuring the Black Keys and several hip hop artists, was released in 2009 on Black Friday. The project was supported and brought together by Damon Dash, who is a big fan of the band. The album features rappers Mos Def, Ludacris, RZA, Raekwon, Pharoahe Monch, Q-Tip, NOE, Jim Jones, Nicole Wray, M.O.P., and the late Ol' Dirty Bastard. The album was recorded in Brooklyn, New York by co-producer, engineer and mixer Joel Hamilton at Studio G. Auerbach said on the official Blakroc site, "Pat and I have been preparing for this record since we were 16."

=== Brothers and commercial breakthrough (2010–2011) ===
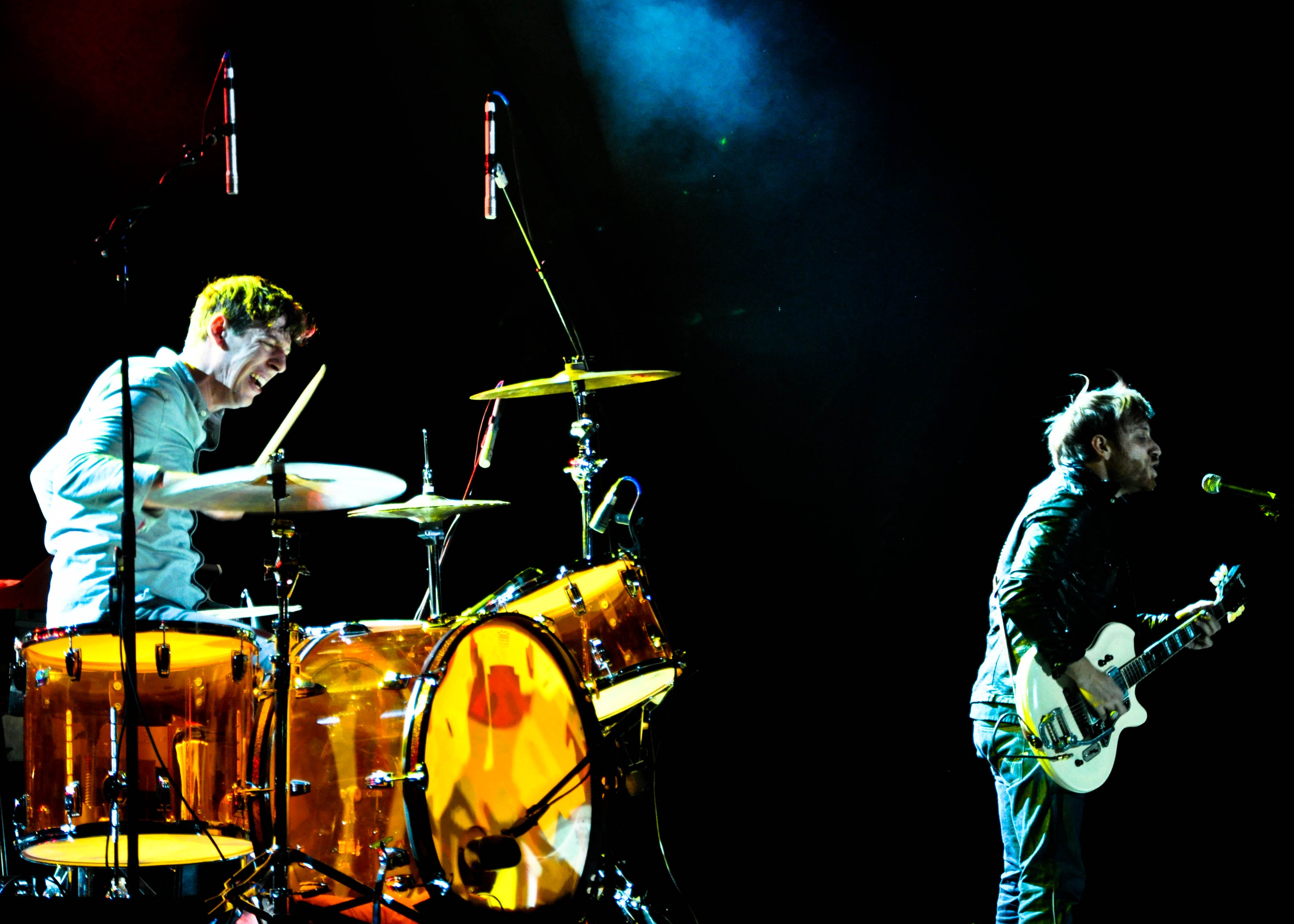
The Black Keys performing in February 2010, three months before the release of their breakthrough album Brothers

Auerbach and Carney moved to Nashville in 2010, where they established a studio downtown.

The group's sixth studio album, Brothers, was released on May 18, 2010. Recorded primarily at Muscle Shoals Sound Studio, the album was produced by the Black Keys and Mark Neill, and was mixed by Tchad Blake. The song "Tighten Up", the only track from the album produced by Danger Mouse, preceded the album as the lead single. The song became their most successful single to that point, spending 10 weeks at number one on the Alternative Songs chart and becoming the group's first single on the Billboard Hot 100, peaking at number 87. The song also reached gold certification status. The music video for "Tighten Up", directed by Chris Marrs Piliero, won the 2010 MTV Video Music Award for Breakthrough Video. Brothers sold over 73,000 copies in the US in its first week and peaked at number three on the Billboard 200, their best performance on the chart to that point. In total, the record sold 1.5 million copies worldwide, including 870,000 copies in the US, and it was certified double-platinum in Canada, platinum in the US, and gold in the UK. The Black Keys were among several artist judges at the 9th annual Independent Music Awards to support independent artists' careers.

The band continued to gain exposure through continued song licensing, so much so that they were Warner Bros. Records' most-licensed band of the year. Rolling Stone placed Brothers at number two on its list of the best albums of 2010 and "Everlasting Light" at number 11 on the list of the year's best songs. Spin named the Black Keys the "Artist of the Year" for 2010. On January 8, 2011, the band appeared as the musical guest on American television sketch comedy show Saturday Night Live. At the 53rd Grammy Awards, Brothers and its songs won awards in three of the five categories they were nominated in; the band received honors for Best Alternative Music Album (for Brothers) and Best Rock Performance by a Duo or Group with Vocal (for "Tighten Up"), while Michael Carney, the band's creative director and Patrick's brother, won Best Recording Package for designing the album's artwork.

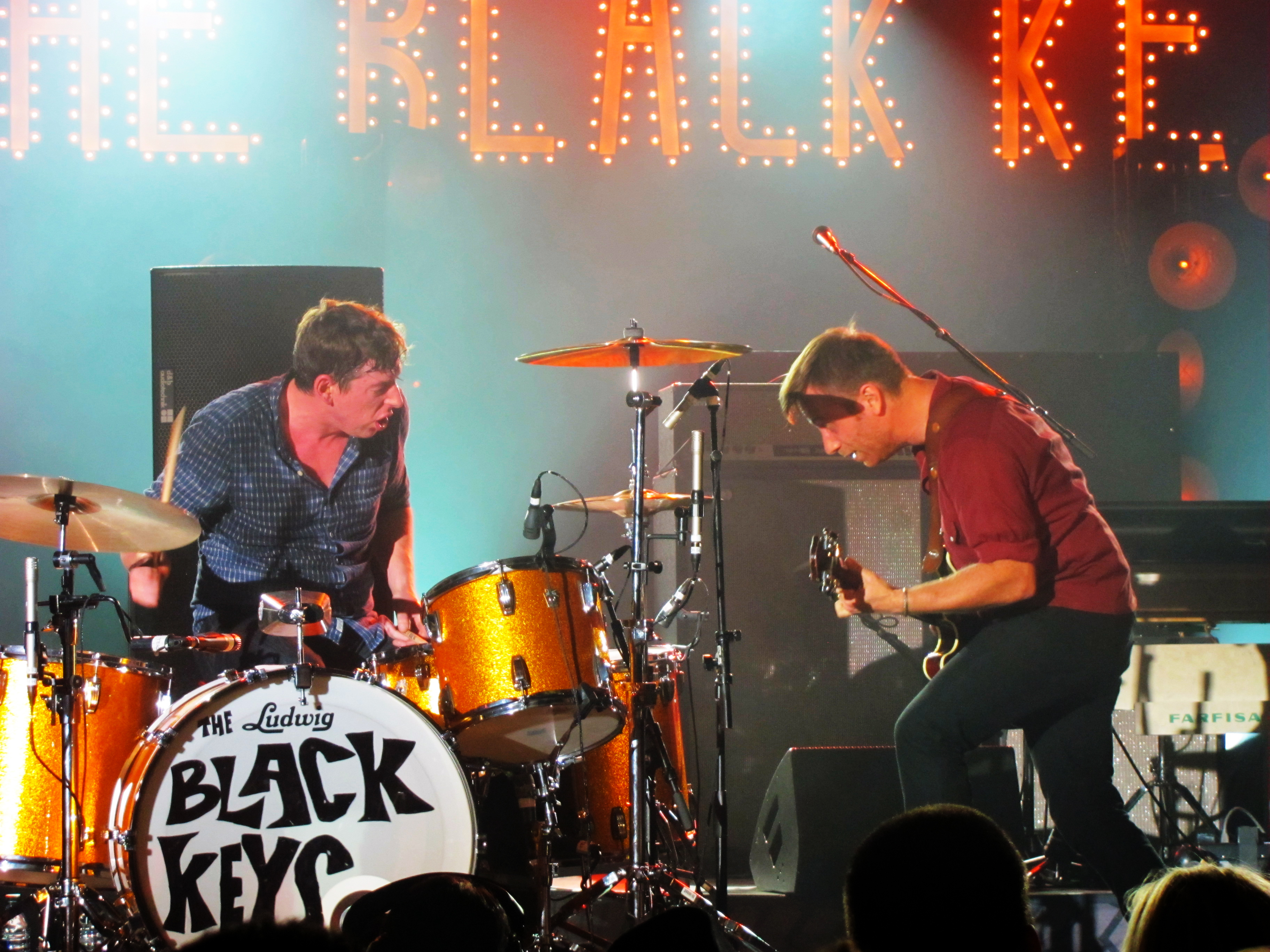
The Black Keys performing in Las Vegas in February 2011

The band's sudden success proved overwhelming, as they found themselves booking additional promotional commitments and facing demand for additional touring dates. In January 2011, the group canceled concerts in Australia, New Zealand, and Europe, citing exhaustion, thus clearing out most of their touring schedule into April. Patrick Carney said, "We've been touring long enough to know when we're about to hit our breaking point." The desire to record another album soon after Brothers also led to the decision. Carney said, "We could have waited another year or so, and milked the Brothers album and kept touring, but we like bands, and our favourite bands growing up and even today, are bands that put out a lot of music and every album is different from the last."

Brothers' second single, "Howlin' for You", was a successful follow-up, achieving a gold certification in the US. The music video, directed by Chris Marrs Piliero, parodied action movie trailers and starred Tricia Helfer, Diora Baird, Sean Patrick Flanery, Christian Serratos, Corbin Bernsen, Todd Bridges, and Shaun White. It was nominated for the 2011 MTV Video Music Award for Best Rock Video. In 2014, the band donated the song rights to PETA for an animal adoption ad campaign.

The Black Keys were nominated for three Billboard Music Awards: Top Alternative Artist, and Top Rock Album and Top Alternative Album for Brothers. The group continued to make appearances at American music festivals throughout the year, playing at Bonnaroo, Kanrocksas, and Outside Lands.

=== El Camino (2011–2013) ===
The group recorded their seventh studio album, El Camino, from March to May 2011. Splitting time between touring and recording, the band spent 41 days at Easy Eye Sound Studio, which was opened in 2010 by Auerbach in the duo's new hometown of Nashville, Tennessee. For the album, Danger Mouse reprised his role as producer and also contributed as a co-writer on all 11 songs. After struggling to translate the slower songs from Brothers to a live setting, the band decided to write more uptempo tracks for El Camino. The record draws from popular genres from the 1950s–1970s, including rock and roll, glam rock, rockabilly, surf rock, and soul. The band cited several retro acts as musical influences on the album, including the Clash, the Cramps, T. Rex, Ramones, the Beatles, the Sweet, the Cars, and Johnny Burnette.

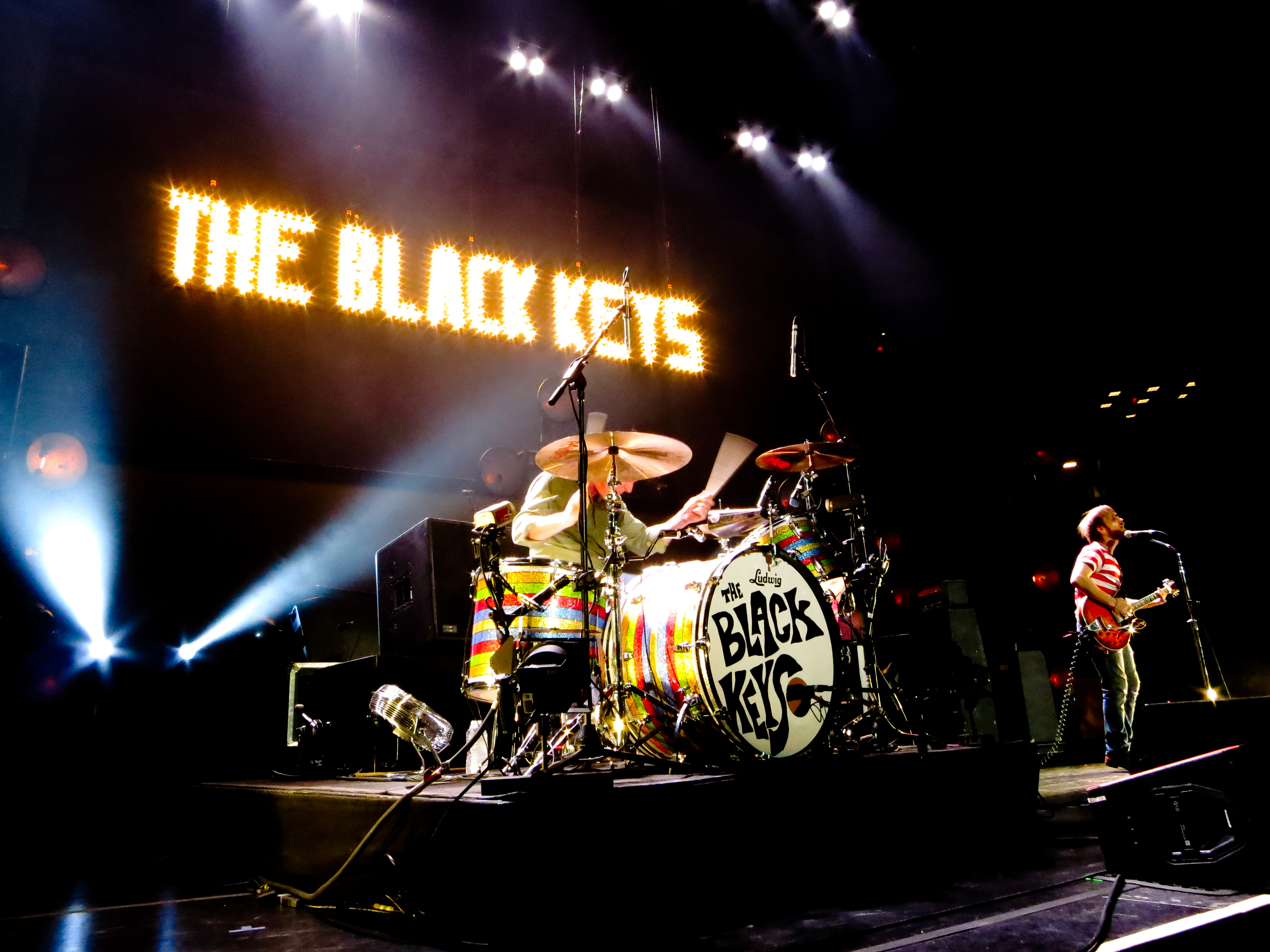
The Black Keys performing at Madison Square Garden in March 2012

"Lonely Boy" was released in October as the album's lead single, accompanied by a popular one-shot music video of a man dancing and lip-syncing. The song became the group's best-charting single in several countries, reaching number 64 on the Billboard Hot 100, number 2 on the Australian Singles Chart, and number 33 on the Canadian Hot 100. The song was certified nine-times platinum in Canada, triple platinum in Australia, platinum in New Zealand, and gold in Denmark. The band returned to Saturday Night Live as a musical guest on December 3, 2011. El Camino was released three days later and received wide critical acclaim. In the US, it debuted at number two on the Billboard 200 and sold 206,000 copies in its first week, the highest single-week sales and (to that point) charting position the group had achieved in the country. Many publications, such as Rolling Stone and Time ranked El Camino among the best albums of the year, despite its late release. The album was certified double-platinum in Australia, Canada, and New Zealand; platinum in the US, UK, and Ireland; and gold in Belgium, the Netherlands, and France.

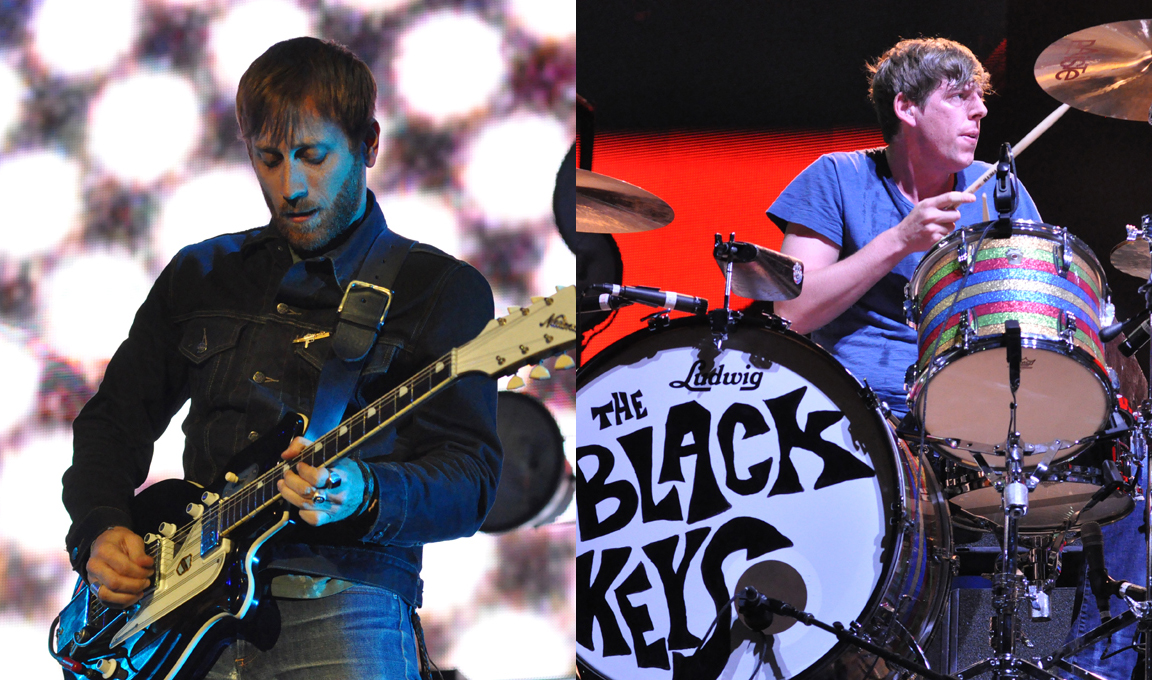
The Black Keys during their headline appearance at Coachella in April 2012

In 2012, the group commenced the first headlining arena tour of its career, the El Camino Tour, playing dates in Europe and North America. After tickets went on sale, their show at Madison Square Garden sold out in 15 minutes. Just as it did on its previous tour, the group added bassist Gus Seyffert and keyboardist/guitarist John Wood as touring musicians in order to perform songs as close to their studio arrangements as possible. The album's second single, "Gold on the Ceiling", like its predecessor, went to number one on the Alternative Songs chart and was certified platinum in Australia and Canada. The group headlined several music festivals throughout the year, including Catalpa Music Festival, Coachella, Memphis in May (in 2013), Lollapalooza, and Osheaga. At the 2013 Grammy Awards, El Camino and "Lonely Boy" were nominated in five categories and were winners in three; the album won Best Rock Album, while "Lonely Boy" won Best Rock Performance and Best Rock Song.

=== Turn Blue and hiatus (2013–2018) ===
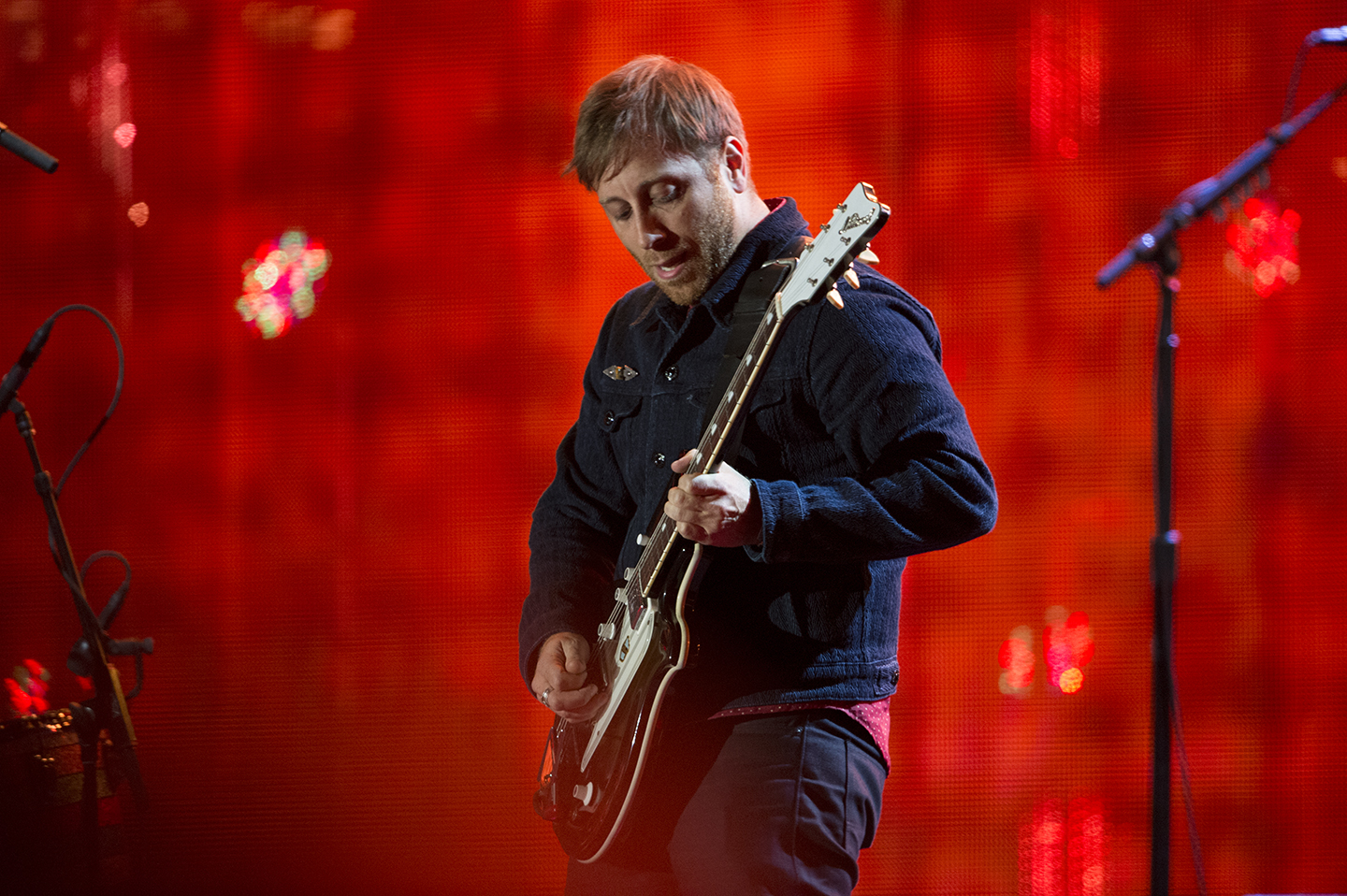
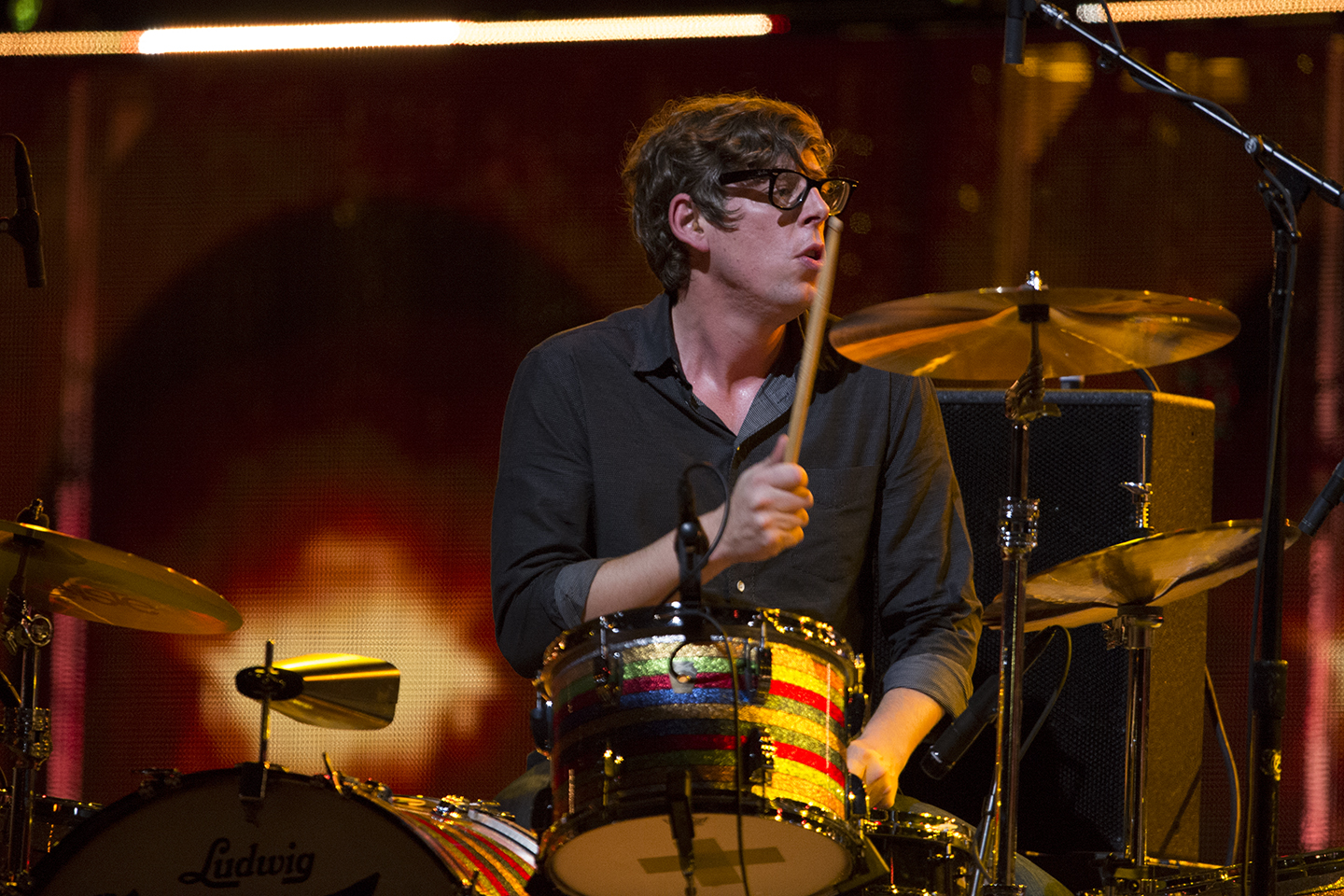
The Black Keys performing at the 2014 Concert for Valor

For their eighth studio album, Turn Blue, the band once again collaborated with Danger Mouse, who co-produced and co-wrote the album. It was recorded primarily at Sunset Sound in Hollywood, California, from July–August 2013, with additional recording at Key Club in Benton Harbor, Michigan, and Nashville's Easy Eye Sound in early 2014. The album was announced in March 2014 via Mike Tyson's Twitter account, with a link to a cryptic teaser video on YouTube featuring a hypnotist, and was released on May 13, 2014. The record exhibits psychedelic rock and soul influences and features a more melancholy tone, largely in part due to Auerbach dealing with the divorce from his wife during the album sessions. The first single, "Fever" was released on March 24, while a second single, "Turn Blue", followed on April 14. The album debuted at number one in the US and Australia, the band's first record to top the album charts in either country; 164,000 copies were sold in the US in its first week. The album was nominated for the Grammy Award for Best Rock Album, with "Fever" being nominated for the Grammy Award for Best Rock Song as well as the Grammy Award for Best Rock Performance. In May 2014, the Black Keys embarked on a world tour to support the album, with Cage the Elephant, Jake Bugg, and St. Vincent all separately opening for them. Several shows on the tour were cancelled after Carney broke and dislocated his shoulder in a swimming accident while vacationing in Saint Barthélemy in January 2015.

After concluding their tour with a performance at Outside Lands Music and Arts Festival in August 2015, the Black Keys began an extended hiatus. Shortly after they began their hiatus, the band were ranked No. 20 on Rolling Stone's list of the 20 Greatest Duos of All Time. During the band's hiatus, Auerbach and Carney were involved in several musical projects on their own. Auerbach formed the Arcs in 2015, who released their debut album, Yours, Dreamily, that September. He also released his second solo album, Waiting on a Song, in 2017, and contributed to albums by artists such as the Pretenders, A$AP Rocky and Jake Bugg. Meanwhile, Carney worked as a producer on albums by Tobias Jesso, Jr. and Karen Elson, and he composed the theme song to the Netflix animated series BoJack Horseman with his late uncle Ralph Carney. In 2017, Carney served as a co-writer, producer, and drummer on Hopeless Romantic, the first studio album by Michelle Branch in 14 years. After beginning a relationship while working on the album, the two were engaged in July 2017 and married in April 2019.

=== Let's Rock, Delta Kream, and Dropout Boogie (2019–2023) ===
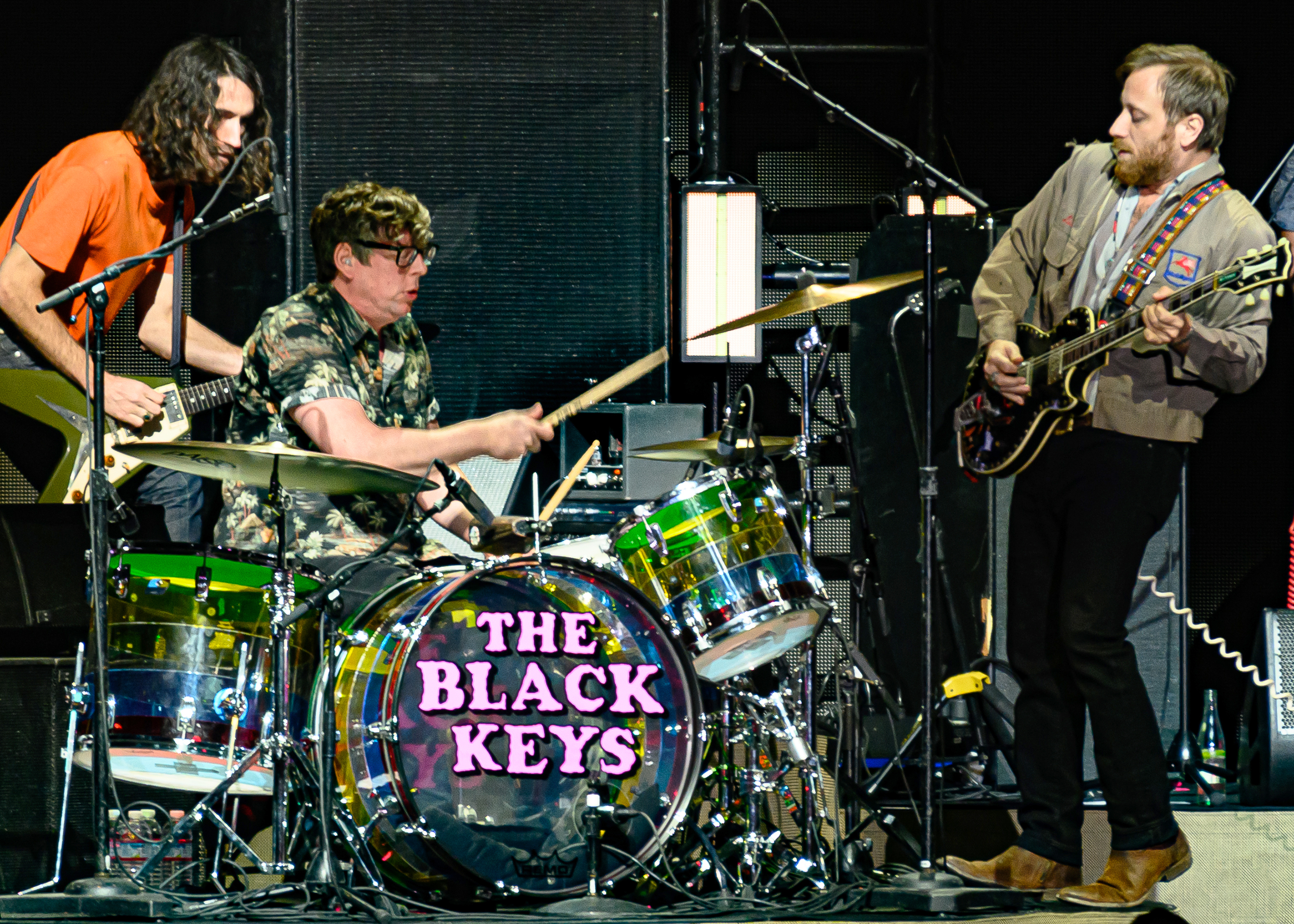
The Black Keys performing at the ALTer EGO concert in January 2020

On March 7, 2019, the Black Keys released the single "Lo/Hi", their first new music released in five years. A week later, the band announced a North American tour co-headlining with Modest Mouse and openers *repeat repeat. On April 25, the Black Keys released "Eagle Birds", the second single from their ninth album, Let's Rock. "Lo/Hi" became the band's first single to reach number one on the Billboard Mainstream Rock chart. On May 16, the band released Let's Rock's third single, "Go".

On April 13, 2021, the Black Keys announced an album comprising 11 covers of hill country blues songs titled Delta Kream, which was released on May 14, 2021. It is their second release of hill country blues covers following the Chulahoma EP in 2006. The announcement was made through the band's Lonely Boys and Girls fan club, through which they also premiered the album's opening track, a cover of John Lee Hooker's version of "Crawling Kingsnake".

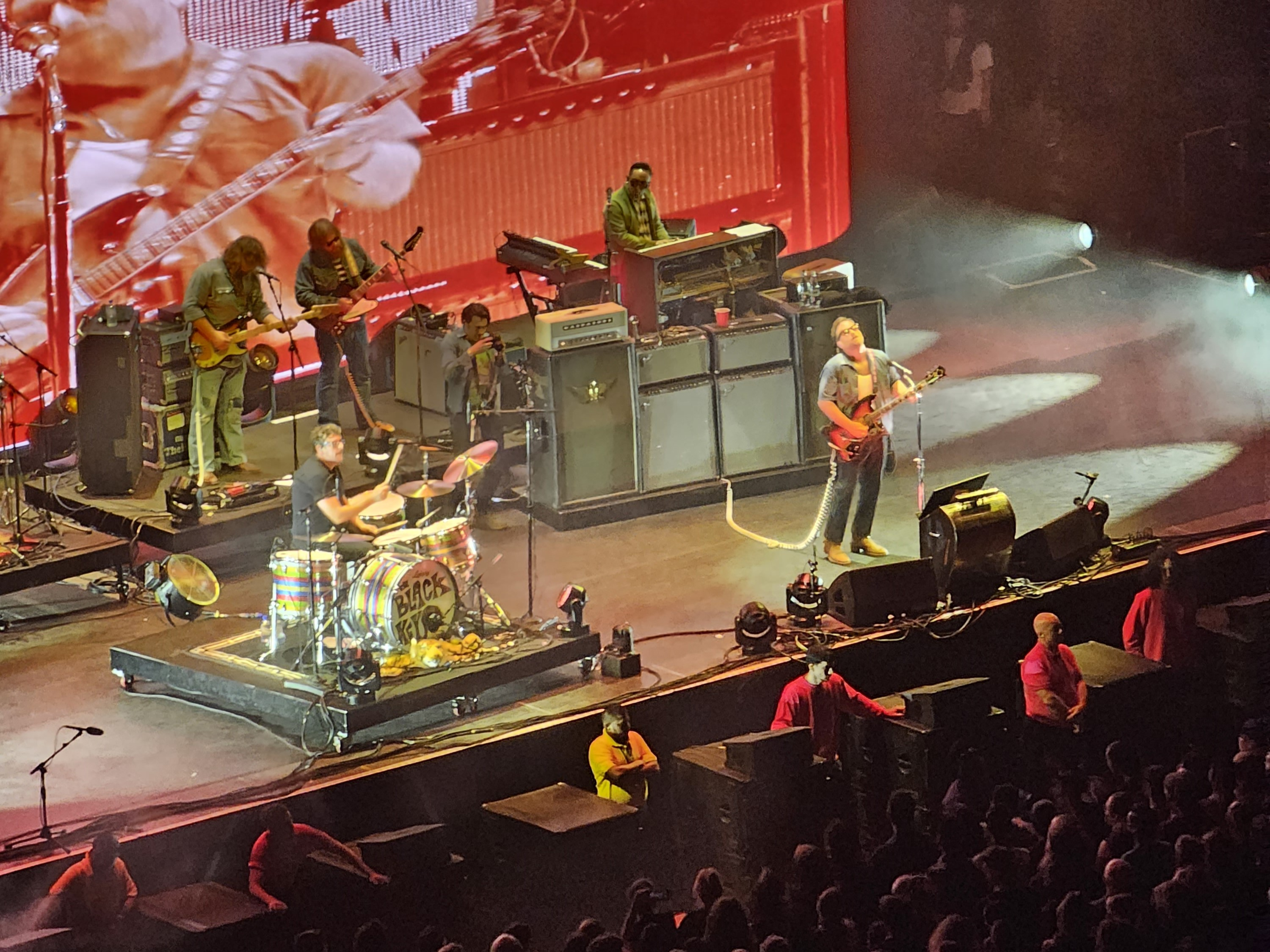
The Black Keys performing in June 2023

On March 10, 2022, the group released the song "Wild Child", their first original music since Let's Rock, along with a music video. This coincided with the announcement of their eleventh album, Dropout Boogie, which was released on May 13, 2022. A second single, "It Ain't Over", was released on April 27, 2022.

On August 11, 2023, the Black Keys released the song "No Lovin'", their contribution to the compilation album Tell Everybody! (21st Century Juke Joint Blues From Easy Eye Sound).

=== Ohio Players and No Rain, No Flowers (2024–2025) ===
On January 12, 2024, the band released the single "Beautiful People (Stay High)", taken from their twelfth studio album Ohio Players. The album was released on April 5, 2024, on streaming services, as well as vinyl, CD and cassette. The album was well received with one review saying the Black Keys have 'found that creative musical joy again'

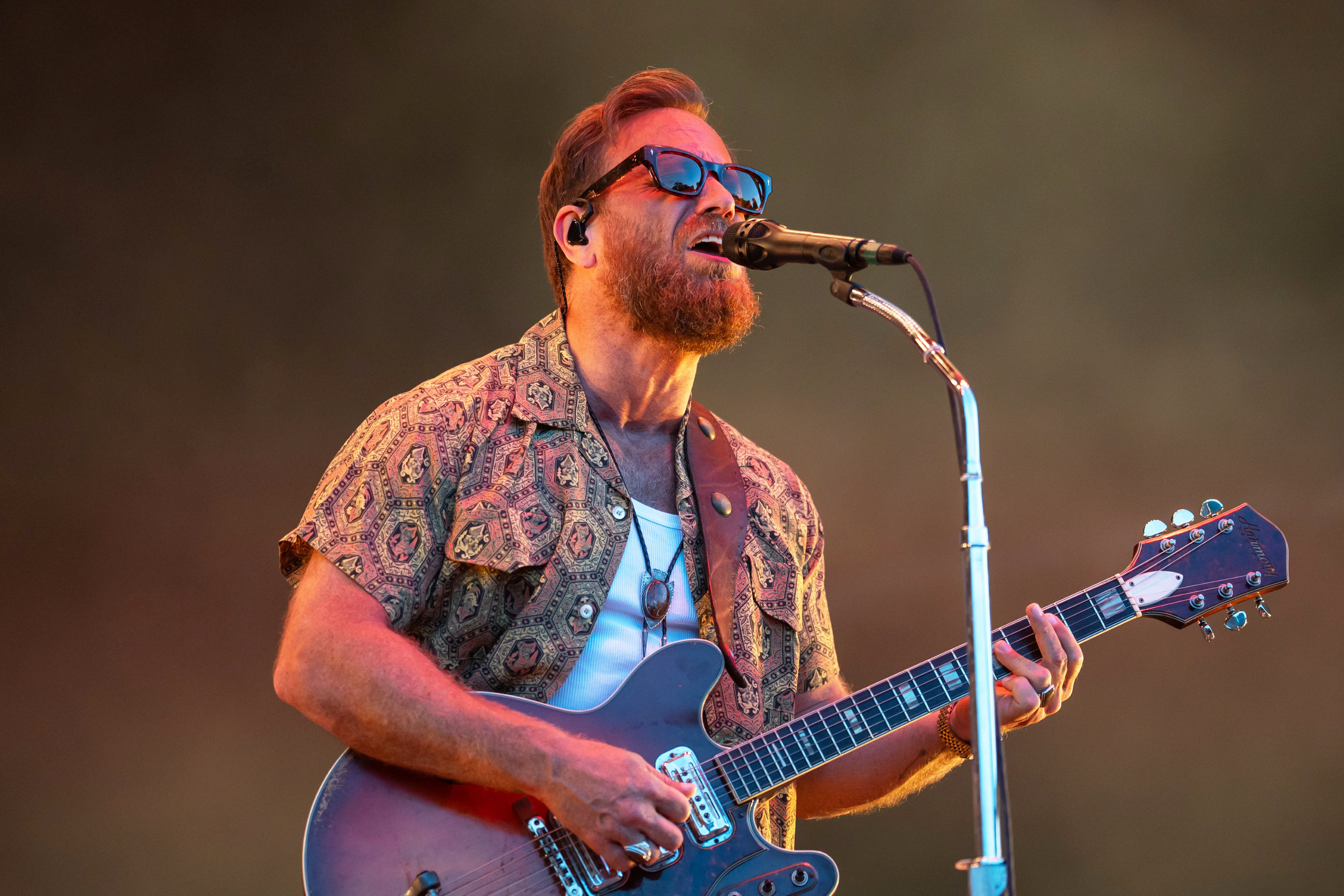
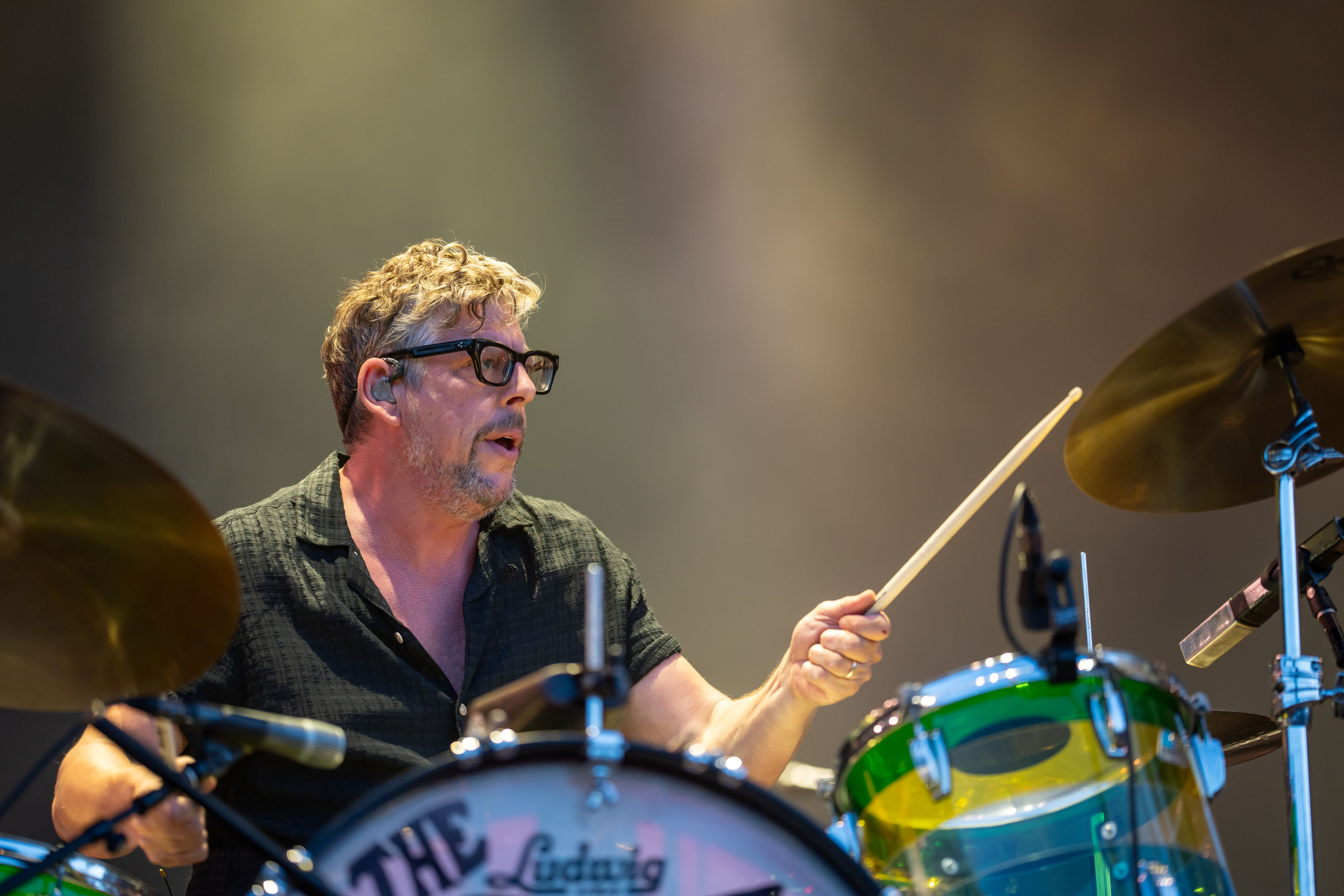
The Black Keys performing at La Nuit de l'Erdre in July 2025

In March 2024, the band appeared at SXSW 2024, participating in an onstage interview during a keynote event. The documentary film This Is a Film About the Black Keys, directed by Jeff Dupre, debuted as part of the film festival. They also performed at SXSW on March 14 and 15. A North America arena tour titled the International Players Tour was announced in April 2024, but was suddenly canceled in May. The band would announce later the tour would be rescheduled for smaller venues. In June 2024, the band split from their managers Irving Azoff and Steve Moir. Media speculation questioned if the tour changes and management departure was due to poor ticket sales, which Carney eventually responded to on social media stating "We got fucked. I'll let you all know how so it doesn't happen to you. Stay tuned."

In late 2024, the band released the singles "Mi Tormenta" featuring DannyLux and "Stay in Your Grave" featuring Alice Cooper in advance of the deluxe "Trophy Edition" of Ohio Players. The band was announced for a show on the "2024 America Loves Crypto Tour" at the Akron Civic Center. The booking was criticized by lifestyle magazine GQ due to the tour's relationship to political action committees financing cryptocurrency friendly politicians in the 2024 US elections. In a later interview with Rolling Stone the band would explain the details of their 2024 tour cancelation due to poor sales, and justified the crypto show as a way to make some income to compensate the staff who were working on the canceled 2024 tour. The band criticized Live Nation Entertainment for monopolistic actions against musicians, and stated a belief that the touring environment at the time was becoming hostile to artists.

During the cancellation of the 2024 tour, the band returned to studio to record the album No Rain, No Flowers, which was released on August 8, 2025, via Easy Eye Sound and Warner Records. An accompanying tour for No Rain, No Flowers was also announced, and on February 7, they released the album's first single, "The Night Before". A second single, "Babygirl", followed on March 21. The third single, the title track, was released on May 16.

=== Peaches! (2026–present) ===
On February 5, 2026, the Black Keys released a cover of "You Got to Lose" by George Thorogood and the Destroyers as the lead single to their third cover album, Peaches!, which released on May 1, 2026.

== Musical style ==
The Black Keys have been described as blues rock, garage rock, punk blues, indie rock, lo-fi, and alternative rock. According to Paste, "they've bounced from the blues to psychedelia to classic, good ol' fashioned rock 'n' roll, and so many of their most interesting tunes bring all those elements together".

== Members ==
- Dan Auerbach – lead vocals, guitar, bass, keyboards (2001–present)
- Patrick Carney – drums, keyboards, guitar, bass, percussion (2001–present)

Current touring musicians

- Ray Jacildo – keyboards, percussion, backing vocals (2021–present)
- Chris St. Hilaire – percussion, backing vocals (2022–present)
- Barrie Cadogan - guitar, backing vocals (2025–present)
- Andy Gabbard – bass, guitar, backing vocals (2019–present)

Former touring musicians

- Leon Michels – keyboards, percussion (2010)
- Nick Movshon – bass (2010)
- Gus Seyffert – bass, backing vocals (2010–2013)
- John Clement Wood – keyboards, backing vocals, guitar, percussion (2010–2015)
- Richard Swift – bass, backing vocals (2014–2015; died 2018)
- Steve Marion – guitar (2019–2020)
- Zach Gabbard – bass, backing vocals (2019–2025)
- Joe Harrison – bass, backing vocals (2025-2026)

Timeline

== Discography ==
Studio albums

- The Big Come Up (2002)
- Thickfreakness (2003)
- Rubber Factory (2004)
- Magic Potion (2006)
- Attack & Release (2008)
- Brothers (2010)
- El Camino (2011)
- Turn Blue (2014)
- Let's Rock (2019)
- Delta Kream (2021)
- Dropout Boogie (2022)
- Ohio Players (2024)
- No Rain, No Flowers (2025)
- Peaches! (2026)

== Awards and nominations ==
=== American Music Awards ===
Year	Nominee / work	Award	Result	Ref.
2011	The Black Keys	Favorite Alternative Artist	Nominated	
2012	The Black Keys	Favorite Alternative Artist	Nominated	

=== ARIA Music Awards ===
Year	Nominee / work	Award	Result	Ref.
2012	The Black Keys	Best International Artist	Nominated	

=== Billboard Music Awards ===
Year	Nominee / work	Award	Result	Ref.
2011	The Black Keys	Top Alternative Artist	Nominated	
2011	Brothers	Top Alternative Album	Nominated	
2011	Brothers	Top Rock Album	Nominated	
2012	The Black Keys	Top Alternative Artist	Nominated	
2012	The Black Keys	Top Rock Artist	Nominated	

=== Brit Awards ===
Year	Nominee / work	Award	Result	Ref.
2013	The Black Keys	International Group	Won	
2015	The Black Keys	International Group	Nominated	

=== Grammy Awards ===
Year	Nominee / work	Award	Result	Ref.
2011	"Tighten Up"	Best Rock Performance by a Duo or Group with Vocal	Won	
2011	"Tighten Up"	Best Rock Song	Nominated	
2011	"Black Mud"	Best Rock Instrumental Performance	Nominated	
2011	Brothers	Best Alternative Music Album	Won	
2012	"Dearest"	Best Pop Duo/Group Performance	Nominated	
2013	"Lonely Boy"	Record of the Year	Nominated	
2013	"Lonely Boy"	Best Rock Performance	Won	
2013	"Lonely Boy"	Best Rock Song	Won	
2013	El Camino	Album of the Year	Nominated	
2013	El Camino	Best Rock Album	Won	
2015	"Fever"	Best Rock Performance	Nominated	
2015	"Fever"	Best Rock Song	Nominated	
2015	Turn Blue	Best Rock Album	Nominated	
2022	Delta Kream	Best Contemporary Blues Album	Nominated	
2023	"Wild Child"	Best Rock Performance	Nominated	
2023	Dropout Boogie	Best Rock Album	Nominated	
2025	"Beautiful People (Stay High)"	Best Rock Performance	Nominated	
2025	"Beautiful People (Stay High)"	Best Rock Song	Nominated	

Note: At the 53rd Annual Grammy Awards (2011), Michael Carney was nominated and won the award for Best Recording Package, for Brothers. At the 55th Annual Grammy Awards (2013), Dan Auerbach was nominated and won the award for Producer of the Year, Non-Classical, for work including the band's El Camino. Auerbach has received four further nominations for the award in 2020, 2021, 2023 and 2026, which included work on music by The Black Keys on all occasions.

=== iHeartRadio Music Awards ===
Year	Nominee / work	Award	Result	Ref.
2015	"Fever"	Alternative Rock Song of the Year	Nominated	
2020	"Lo/Hi"	Rock Song of the Year	Nominated	

=== MTV Video Music Awards ===
Year	Nominee / work	Award	Result	Ref.
2010	"Tighten Up"	Breakthrough Video	Won	
2011	"Howlin' for You"	Best Rock Video	Nominated	
2012	"Lonely Boy"	Best Rock Video	Nominated	
2014	"Fever"	Best Rock Video	Nominated	

=== Q Awards ===
Year	Nominee / work	Award	Result	Ref.
2012	El Camino	Best Album	Nominated	
2014	Turn Blue	Best Album	Nominated	

=== UK Music Video Awards ===
Year	Nominee / work	Award	Result	Ref.
2011	"Howlin' for You"	Best Indie/Alternative Video	Nominated	

Preceded by Eminem and Lil Wayne	Saturday Night Live musical guest January 8, 2011	Succeeded by Cee-Lo Green
Preceded by Florence + the Machine	Saturday Night Live musical guest December 3, 2011	Succeeded by Robyn
Preceded by Coldplay	Saturday Night Live musical guest May 10, 2014	Succeeded by St. Vincent
