= Let's Rock (The Black Keys album) =

Studio album by the Black Keys
- Released: June 28, 2019
- Recorded: September 2018 – January 2019
- Studios: Easy Eye Sound (Nashville, Tennessee)
- Genres: Garage rock; blues rock
- Length: 38:30
- Labels: Easy Eye Sound; Nonesuch
- Producers: Dan Auerbach; Patrick Carney

The Black Keys chronology
Turn Blue (2014)	Let's Rock (2019)	Delta Kream (2021)

Singles from Let's Rock
- 1. "Lo/Hi" Released: March 7, 2019; 2. "Eagle Birds" Released: April 25, 2019; 3. "Go" Released: May 16, 2019; 4. "Shine a Little Light" Released: January 21, 2020

Let's Rock (stylized with single quotation marks) is the ninth studio album by American rock duo the Black Keys. It was released on June 28, 2019, through Easy Eye Sound/Nonesuch Records. It was their first release since Turn Blue (2014), marking the longest gap between studio albums in their career. After collaborating with producer Danger Mouse for their previous four records, the duo decided to self-produce Let's Rock and to eschew keyboards in favor of a basic recording approach of guitar, drums, and vocals. Drummer Patrick Carney called the album "an homage to electric guitar".

Let's Rock was preceded by the singles "Lo/Hi", "Eagle Birds", and "Go". "Lo/Hi" topped Billboard's Mainstream Rock, Adult Alternative Songs, Rock Airplay, and Alternative Songs charts in the US simultaneously, making it the first song ever to do so. Let's Rock received generally positive reviews, with many critics calling it a well-crafted if unoriginal album.

== Background ==
The Black Keys' previous studio album, Turn Blue, was released in May 2014. Their fourth collaboration with producer Danger Mouse, the record exhibits psychedelic rock and soul influences and features a more melancholy tone, largely in part due to guitarist Dan Auerbach dealing with the divorce from his wife during the recording sessions. The same month as the album release, the band embarked on a supporting world tour. Several concerts on the tour were cancelled after drummer Patrick Carney broke and dislocated his shoulder in a swimming accident while vacationing in Saint Barthélemy in January 2015. After concluding the tour with a performance at Outside Lands Music and Arts Festival in San Francisco in August 2015, the group began an extended hiatus. Carney worried about the band's future, pointing out that groups such as the Sex Pistols, the Band, and the Beatles had all played their final concerts in San Francisco.

Carney said that it was Auerbach who made the decision to take a break, and despite being frustrated with the length of it, Carney thought it was the right thing for them to do. Both felt burned out from constant touring and thought that the songwriting process, their favorite part of being musicians, had become overshadowed by touring commitments. Auerbach said: "We like creating the songs. And I know you can't have your cake and eat it too — we've got to go perform them. But it's not a good feeling to work so hard to do the thing you love and just not ever be able to get to create. It can be maddening." Carney's shoulder injury was also more serious than he would admit and consequently required more time to recover, according to Uncut.

During the band's hiatus, Auerbach and Carney were involved in several musical projects on their own. Auerbach primarily occupied himself with recording sessions at his studio Easy Eye Sound in Nashville, Tennessee, working with older Americana artists and session musicians such as John Prine, Duane Eddy, Dave Roe, Gene Chrisman, and Bobby Wood. In 2015, Auerbach formed a new band, the Arcs, who released their debut album, Yours, Dreamily, that September. He also released his second solo album, Waiting on a Song, in 2017. Auerbach produced more than a dozen albums during the group's hiatus. He said: "To be honest, I wasn't even thinking about The Black Keys at all. It was completely out of my mind. Playing arenas felt like some sort of distant dream..." Meanwhile, Carney produced and recorded more than a dozen albums for artists such as Calvin Johnson, Dams of the West, Tennis, Jessy Wilson, *repeat repeat, and Sad Planets. In 2017, Carney served as a co-writer, producer, and drummer on Michelle Branch's record Hopeless Romantic, her first studio album in 14 years. After beginning a romantic relationship during the album's production, the two had a son and later married in April 2019.

While Auerbach was collaborating with guitarist Joe Walsh at Easy Eye Sound, the two had a conversation about how Glenn Schwartz, the original guitarist for the James Gang, inspired both of them to pursue futures in rock music. They subsequently invited Schwartz to the studio sessions and recorded about 90 minutes of him playing guitar. Auerbach found the experience inspirational, as it reminded him of his youth when he would attend Schwartz's live performances in Cleveland and then try to emulate his style of guitar playing when jamming with his bandmate Carney. Auerbach said that working with one of his idols inspired him to reunite with Carney: "It was just that little nudge I needed. Right after that session I called Pat and we put it on the books."

== Writing and recording ==
The Black Keys re-convened at Easy Eye Sound on September 5, 2018, at 10 a.m. to begin working on "Let's Rock", ending a three-year hiatus. Within a few minutes, the duo had picked up their instruments and were playing together as if no time had passed. M. Allen Parker, the chief recording engineer, said, "There was instant chemistry between them. The first time Pat came into the studio they hadn't seen each other in a while, but they became The Black Keys instantly." As is customary for the band, they did not have any songs written in advance and instead created them in the studio. Auerbach said: "I didn't want to overthink it. I wanted it to feel spontaneous." Describing their songwriting process, the guitarist said that for most of the songs he "would make up the whole form from top to bottom. Intro, verse, chorus, turnaround, verse, chorus, bridge, turnaround, outro, tag, ending. I'd work it on the floor. Pat has a knack for knowing what to do." During this process, Auerbach ad-libbed vocals, which were replaced later once he finalized the lyrics. After working on a song idea for an hour, the group would decide whether they liked it enough to continue pursuing it or whether to move on to another idea. Within the first 30 minutes back together, the duo created their first musical idea, which became the song "Breaking Down". Carney said that in their first day, the duo wrote two songs, and that by the end of their first week, they had 15–16 song ideas. By his estimate, the group created 27 total song ideas during the recording sessions, of which they completed 13.

The group recorded for weeks at a time from September 2018 to January 2019, taking breaks for Auerbach to write lyrics. Carney said they spent three-and-a-half to four weeks in the studio in total. Halfway through the recording sessions, the duo realized that they had not used keyboards on any songs and decided to continue with that approach. Carney called the album "an homage to electric guitar", and said the only synthesized sound that appears on the album was created by the string pad of an MTI Auto Orchestra drum machine for the song "Walk Across the Water". Besides contributions from two backing vocalists (Leisa Hans and Ashley Wilcoxson), Auerbach and Carney did not collaborate with anyone else to compose the music, and the two co-produced the album.

== Packaging and title ==
The album title and artwork were inspired by a news story regarding the execution of convicted murderer Edmund Zagorski by electric chair on November 1, 2018, the first such execution in Tennessee in 11 years. When asked for any last words, Zagorski reportedly told a guard, "Let's rock". Auerbach came across the story in a copy of a local newspaper, The Tennessean, that had been left in the studio during the initial recording sessions. Several months later, when the time came for the group to choose an album title and cover image, he was reminded of the story: "those words kept coming back to me, how absurd they were and how right on the money they were. We'd just made this rock 'n' roll record and it felt right, like it was given to us, like we were supposed to use it." Auerbach also liked the title because he anticipated it would mislead people: "99 per cent of people are going to think it's about rock'n'roll. And it's the thing we like least. We're not rock'n'roll guys. We fucking hate rock'n'roll guys. We always have. The idea of pyrotechnics on stage and lasers is always so goofy."

== Release and promotion ==
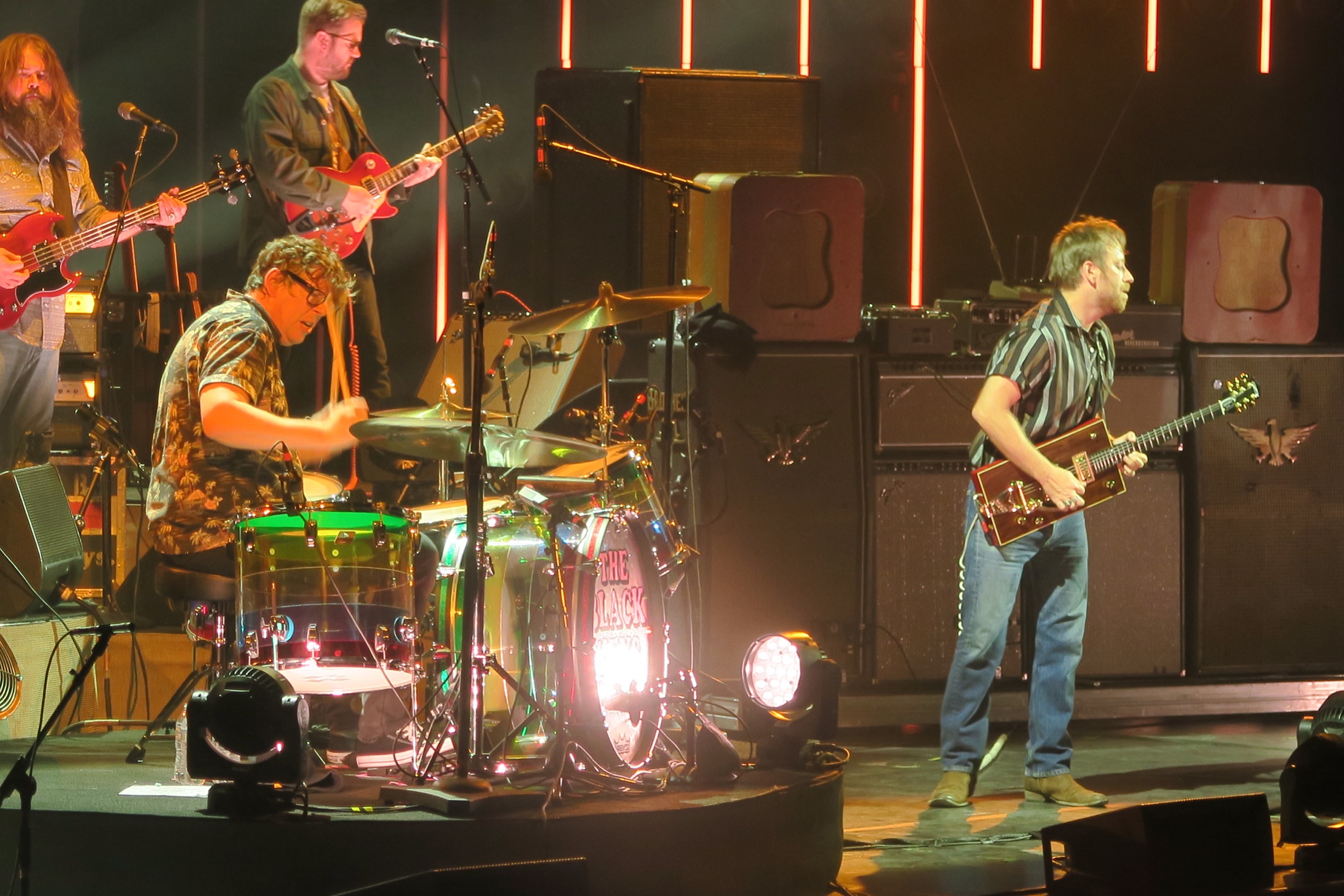
The Black Keys performing on the Let's Rock Tour in November 2019

The album's lead single, "Lo/Hi", was released on March 7, 2019, marking the band's first new material to be released in nearly five years. The next day, the song was announced as the theme music for television coverage of the 2019 NCAA Division I men's basketball tournament. The song topped Billboard's Mainstream Rock, Adult Alternative Songs, Rock Airplay, and Alternative Songs charts simultaneously, making it the first time any song had reached number one on all four formats at once. On March 14, the band announced a North American concert tour, the "Let's Rock" Tour, with co-headliners Modest Mouse. On April 25, the Black Keys officially announced the album, including the album artwork, track listing, and June 28 release date. The announcement was accompanied by the release of a second single, "Eagle Birds".

The group refused to bundle copies of the album with purchases of merchandise or concert tour tickets, as has become common in the music industry to help bolster album sale figures. Carney called such a practice a "gimmick" that "exists solely as a way to game the charts". He said, "We figure people are going to buy it or they're not going to buy it. The only metrics I'm really concerned with are whether people enjoy the record."

The band filmed a facetious video for Funny or Die that was released in July, in which they self-seriously offer to teach a MasterClass on writing music.

== Reception ==
=== Critical response ===
Professional ratings
Aggregate scores
Source	Rating
Metacritic	73/100
Review scores
Source	Rating
AllMusic	4/5 stars
Consequence of Sound	B−
The Guardian	4/5 stars
The Independent	4/5 stars
Mojo	3/5 stars
NME	3/5 stars
Paste	7.2/10
Pitchfork	7.0/10
Rolling Stone	4/5 stars
The Times	4/5 stars

According to review aggregator website Metacritic, the album received an average score of 73/100, based on 23 reviews. David Fricke of Rolling Stone said that the band "bring a heightened purism... emphasizing the power-duo force of their early records amid the riffing storm in 'Eagle Birds' and 'Go.' The effect: like 2003's Thickfreakness in higher fidelity". Will Hodgkinson of The Times said, "There is nothing groundbreaking here, and no great revelation of character, but Auerbach and Carney capture the essence of solid, back-to-basics rock'n'roll in a way that cannot help but make you feel good." He said listeners not concerned with the album's unoriginality would find it to be a great summer record because "the Black Keys do this kind of thing with such élan". Eric R. Danton of Paste said that rather than revisiting the sound of their earliest days, the record was a sampler of other styles and strengths of the band members. He concluded his review by saying: "If you're looking for experiments with song structure or eclectic instrumentation, this probably isn't the album for you. If you want something you can crank up at backyard barbecues or in the car with the windows down, well, The Black Keys have two words for you, and they're in the album title." Michael Hann of The Guardian said, "The lyrics are rarely more than functional... but the music is persuasive: hard, shining rock, with an irresistible pop edge." Patrick Smith of The Independent said that neither of the group's most well-known albums, Brothers and El Camino, "can claim to be as fiendishly catchy as Let's Rock, a record that can scarcely sit still". Smith said the album's musical influences were obvious, but said "if this is genre pastiche, it's genre pastiche done with skill and savvy."

Victoria Segal of Mojo said "while these songs have the pop of 2011's excellent El Camino, some of that crackle is missing". She said despite the songs being tightly constructed, the record "still feels as if the emotional wiring has been botched". Segal added, "There's a lyrical lethargy that doesn't help but more acutely, even after five years absence, there's an over-familiarity." Evan Rytlewski of Pitchfork commented that the absence of Danger Mouse's studio flourishes "leaves more room for riffs, and 'Let's Rock' doesn't skimp on them." He said that at times the group leaned too heavily on imitating their musical influences, judging, "Ambitious? No. Effective? Swish." NME's Rhian Daly said the album's "spontaneous energy can't mask its undercooked sound and lack of impact" and that the songs did not leave much of a lasting impact as it progressed. She said that "while there are a few redeeming moments, their reunion doesn't sound remotely close to the work of two musicians reclaiming their best years". Ryan Bray of Consequence of Sound said the record was filled with "crunchy, blues-flavored guitar licks" and that the duo "dish out a record that stylishly fetishizes rock music's golden age". Bray, however, was disappointed that the group, in Danger Mouse's absence, did not return to the rawness of their early days. Ultimately, he said the record was "a layered, well-orchestrated affair, and as long as you're willing to let go of any hope of a return to those lean and mean Thickfreakness days, 'Let's Rock' won't disappoint".

Loudwire named it one of the 50 best rock albums of 2019.

=== Commercial performance ===
Let's Rock debuted at number four on the US Billboard 200, totaling 52,000 album-equivalent units in its first week, 41,000 of which were sales. The album debuted on the UK Albums Chart at number three, marking the group's third consecutive top-ten album in the UK. The album also made top-ten debuts in Australia, Austria, Belgium, Canada, France, Germany, Ireland, the Netherlands, New Zealand, Norway, and Switzerland.

== Track listing ==
All songs written and produced by Dan Auerbach and Patrick Carney.

No.	Title	Length
1.	"Shine a Little Light"	3:16
2.	"Eagle Birds"	2:40
3.	"Lo/Hi"	2:57
4.	"Walk Across the Water"	3:55
5.	"Tell Me Lies"	3:40
6.	"Every Little Thing"	3:20
7.	"Get Yourself Together"	3:56
8.	"Sit Around and Miss You"	2:40
9.	"Go"	2:26
10.	"Breaking Down"	3:25
11.	"Under the Gun"	3:16
12.	"Fire Walk with Me"	2:58
Total length:		38:30

== Personnel ==
The Black Keys

- Dan Auerbach – vocals, guitar, bass guitar, percussion
- Patrick Carney – drums, guitar, percussion

Additional performers

- Leisa Hans – backing vocals
- Ashley Wilcoxson – backing vocals

Production

- Dan Auerbach – co-producer
- Patrick Carney – co-producer
- Tchad Blake – mixing engineer
- Richard Dodd – mastering engineer
- M. Allen Parker – engineer
- Marc Whitmore – engineer

== Charts ==
=== Weekly charts ===
Chart (2019)	Peak position
Australian Albums (ARIA)	4
Austrian Albums (Ö3 Austria)	5
Belgian Albums (Ultratop Flanders)	6
Belgian Albums (Ultratop Wallonia)	4
Canadian Albums (Billboard)	4
Croatian International Albums (HDU)	1
Czech Albums (ČNS IFPI)	68
Dutch Albums (Album Top 100)	3
Finnish Albums (Suomen virallinen lista)	11
French Albums (SNEP)	8
German Albums (Offizielle Top 100)	7
Hungarian Albums (MAHASZ)	3
Irish Albums (IRMA)	10
Italian Albums (FIMI)	11
Japanese Albums (Oricon)	131
Latvian Albums (LAIPA)	18
Lithuanian Albums (AGATA)	26
New Zealand Albums (RMNZ)	5
Norwegian Albums (VG-lista)	9
Polish Albums (ZPAV)	24
Portuguese Albums (AFP)	4
Scottish Albums (Official Charts)	4
Spanish Albums (Promusicae)	6
Swedish Albums (Sverigetopplistan)	32
Swiss Albums (Schweizer Hitparade)	3
UK Albums (Official Charts)	3
US Billboard 200	4
US Top Rock Albums (Billboard)	1

=== Year-end charts ===
Chart (2019)	Position
Belgian Albums (Ultratop Flanders)	153
Belgian Albums (Ultratop Wallonia)	174
US Top Rock Albums (Billboard)	65

== Certifications ==
Region	Certification	Certified units/sales
Canada (Music Canada)	Gold	40,000^{‡}
^{‡} Sales+streaming figures based on certification alone.
