= Howlin' for You =

Single by The Black Keys

from the album Brothers
- Released: January 25, 2011
- Recorded: Muscle Shoals Sound Studio, Muscle Shoals, Alabama
- Genre: Garage rock; blues rock
- Length: 3:12
- Label: Nonesuch
- Songwriters: Dan Auerbach, Patrick Carney
- Producers: The Black Keys, Mark Neill

The Black Keys singles chronology
"Next Girl" (2010)	"Howlin' for You" (2011)	"Lonely Boy" (2011)

Music video
- "Howlin' For You" on YouTube

"Howlin' for You" is a song by The Black Keys from the band's sixth album, Brothers. The song was influenced by Gary Glitter's 1972 song "Rock and Roll".

== Music video ==
An official video was released for the song. The music video—a parody of a sexploitation film trailer—was directed by Chris Marrs Piliero, starring Tricia Helfer, Diora Baird, Sean Patrick Flanery, Christian Serratos, Corbin Bernsen, Todd Bridges, and Shaun White, as well as Dan Auerbach and Patrick Carney of the band in the role of "Las Teclas de Negro" (translated from Spanish as "The Keys of Black").

A behind-the-scenes interview with Piliero, filmed during production of the video, has tongue-in-cheek commentary and brief clips of the cast members describing their characters.

The video was one of five nominees for the 2011 MTV Video Music Award for Best Rock Video.

== Critical reception ==
"Howlin' for You" is widely regarded as one of the band's best songs. In 2012, Complex ranked the song number ten on their list of the 15 greatest Black Keys songs, and in 2021, American Songwriter ranked the song number four on their list of the 10 greatest Black Keys songs.

== Appearances in other media ==
"Howlin' for You" is featured on the soundtrack of the EA Sports video games, NHL 11, NHL Slapshot and Need for Speed Payback, as well as NBA 2K14. The song has been featured in TV commercials and films for The Dilemma, Limitless, The Guilt Trip, Moneyball, Dark Shadows, Citizen Gangster, Deadpool, Venom: Let There Be Carnage, and The Bad Guys. It is used as the theme song to the Australian police drama television series, Cops L.A.C., and has been featured in American television series, CSI: Miami, Detroit 1-8-7, Entourage, Once Upon a Time, Prime Suspect, Chuck, Necessary Roughness, Suits, Lucifer, Secret Diary of a Call Girl and The Chicago Code. MLB's Toronto Blue Jays used it as their home run song (except for José Bautista), and the NHL's Arizona Coyotes used it as their goal song.

== Charts ==
=== Weekly charts ===
Chart (2011)	Peak position
Canada Hot 100 (Billboard)	50
Canada Rock (Billboard)	2
US Bubbling Under Hot 100 (Billboard)	16
US Hot Rock & Alternative Songs (Billboard)	5
US Adult Alternative Airplay (Billboard)	9
US Alternative Airplay (Billboard)	3
US Mainstream Rock (Billboard)	39

=== Year-end charts ===
Chart (2011)	Position
US Hot Rock Songs (Billboard)	11

== Certifications ==
Region	Certification	Certified units/sales
Canada (Music Canada)	6× Platinum	480,000^{‡}
Italy (FIMI)	Gold	25,000^{‡}
New Zealand (RMNZ)	Platinum	30,000^{‡}
United Kingdom (BPI)	Silver	200,000^{‡}
United States (RIAA)	Platinum	1,000,000^{‡}
^{*} Sales figures based on certification alone.^{‡} Sales+streaming figures based on certification alone.
