= Dropout Boogie =

Studio album by the Black Keys
- Released: May 13, 2022
- Recorded: June–October 2021
- Studio: Easy Eye (Nashville, Tennessee)
- Genre: Blues rock, garage rock
- Length: 33:55
- Label: Easy Eye Sound; Nonesuch
- Producer: The Black Keys

The Black Keys chronology
Delta Kream (2021)	Dropout Boogie (2022)	Ohio Players (2024)

Singles from Dropout Boogie
- 1. "Wild Child" Released: March 10, 2022; 2. "It Ain't Over" Released: April 27, 2022

Dropout Boogie is the eleventh studio album by American rock duo the Black Keys. It was released on May 13, 2022, by Easy Eye Sound and Nonesuch Records. The album was preceded by the release of two singles: the lead single "Wild Child", which was released on March 10, 2022, in conjunction with the album announcement, and "It Ain't Over", which was released on April 27, 2022.

Dropout Boogie received favorable reviews from music critics and was nominated for Best Rock Album and Best Rock Performance for lead single "Wild Child" at the 65th Annual Grammy Awards.

== Background ==
Work for Dropout Boogie began in summer of 2021, which initially saw the Black Keys plan ideas for the album as a duo before recruiting multiple musicians to collaborate with them such as Greg Cartwright of Reigning Sound and Billy Gibbons of ZZ Top, the latter a longtime friend of the duo. The album was recorded at Dan Auerbach's Easy Eye Sound studio in Nashville, Tennessee.

== Promotion ==
=== Singles ===
The album's lead single "Wild Child" was released on March 10, 2022. The song topped Billboard's Adult Alternative Airplay chart and would later be used as the theme song for the 2024 WWE Royal Rumble premium live event. The second single from the album, "It Ain't Over", was released on April 27, 2022.

=== US Tour ===
To promote the album, the Black Keys embarked on the Dropout Boogie Tour, which consisted of 32 dates across the United States with Band of Horses as a supporting act alongside Ceramic Animal, Early James, and The Velveteers as opening acts on select dates.

=== European Tour ===
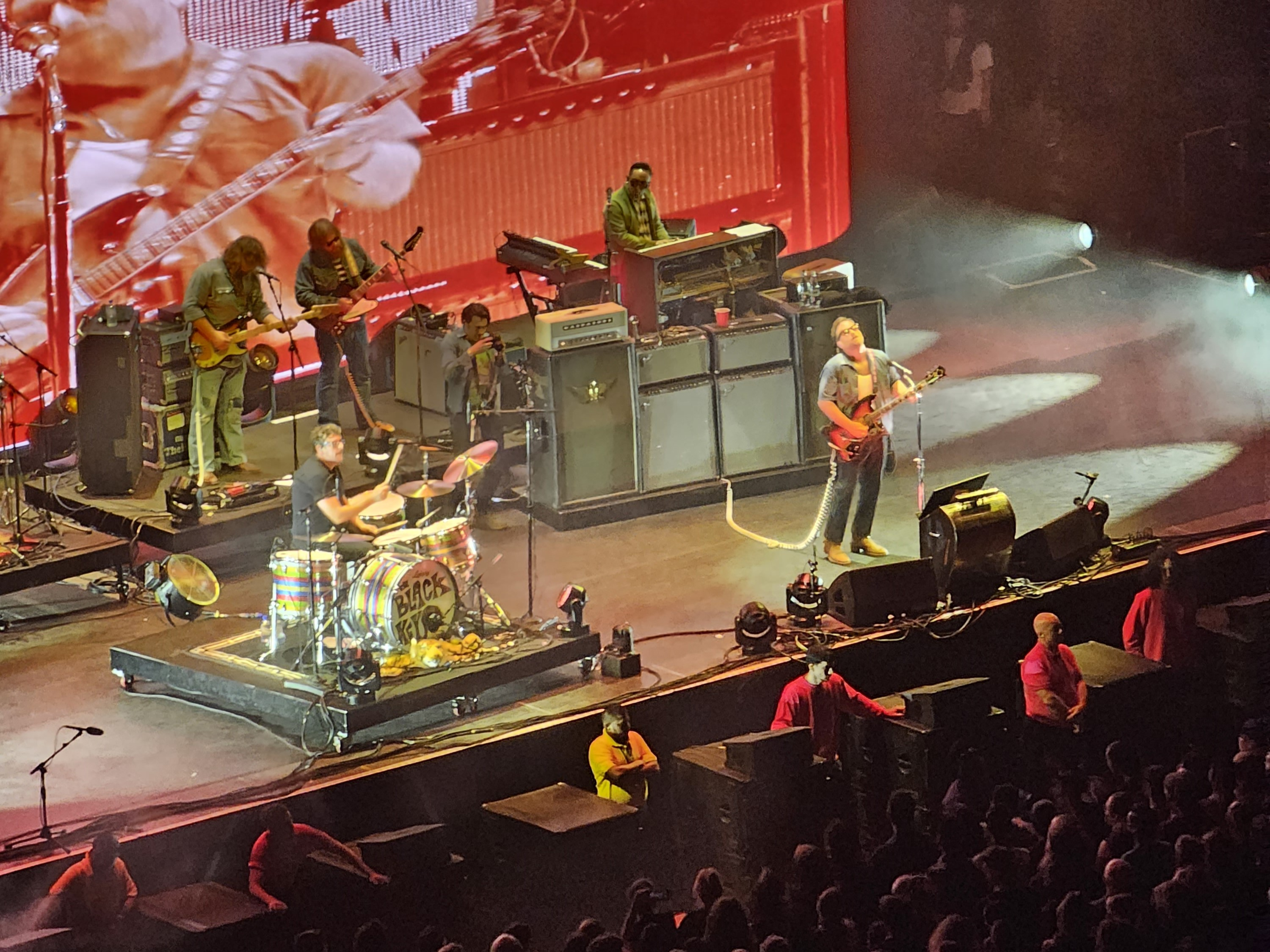
The Black Keys performing their Dropout Boogie tour at The O2 Arena, June 21, 2023

On December 8, 2022, the band announced a European and UK tour, consisting of seven dates across Europe, with support of Austin rock band Spoon.

== Critical reception ==
Professional ratings
Aggregate scores
Source	Rating
AnyDecentMusic?	6.9/10
Metacritic	73/100
Review scores
Source	Rating
AllMusic	4/5 stars
American Songwriter	4/5 stars
DIY	3.5/5 stars
NME	3/5 stars
Pitchfork	6.0/10
PopMatters	7/10
Rolling Stone	3.5/5 stars

Upon release, Dropout Boogie received positive reviews from critics. At Metacritic, which assigns a normalized score out of 100 based on reviews from mainstream publications, the album has a score of 73 based on 12 critical reviews, indicating "generally favorable reviews". Aggregator AnyDecentMusic? gave the album a score of 6.9 based on their assessment of the critical consensus. Hal Horowitz of American Songwriter gave the album four out of five stars, and concluded his review by writing: "Fame, fortune and influence haven't dulled [the band's] initial impulses, something made clear on the hypnotic unvarnished vibe created throughout the superb Dropout Boogie." Writing for AllMusic, Stephen Thomas Erlewine also gave the album four out of five stars and noted how the material on the album "feels open and lively in a way" in contrast to the band's most recent work and added that the album as a whole "gives the impression of a jukebox filled with a bunch of excavated gems".

Joe Goggins of DIY said that the album was "a step forward rather than back for The Black Keys" and had the possibility of being their "most varied record" since their 2011 album El Camino.

== Track listing ==
Dropout Boogie track listing
No.	Title	Writer(s)	Length
1.	"Wild Child"	Dan Auerbach; Patrick Carney; Angelo Petraglia; Greg Cartwright	2:44
2.	"It Ain't Over"	Auerbach; Carney; Cartwright	3:48
3.	"For the Love of Money"	Auerbach; Carney; Petraglia	3:31
4.	"Your Team Is Looking Good"	Auerbach; Carney	3:05
5.	"Good Love" (featuring Billy F. Gibbons)	Auerbach; Carney; Billy Gibbons	3:37
6.	"How Long"	Auerbach; Carney	3:20
7.	"Burn the Damn Thing Down"	Auerbach; Carney	2:57
8.	"Happiness"	Auerbach; Carney	3:44
9.	"Baby I'm Coming Home"	Auerbach; Carney; Cartwright	3:08
10.	"Didn't I Love You"	Auerbach; Carney	4:01
Total length:			33:55

== Personnel ==
The Black Keys

- Dan Auerbach – vocals, bass, guitar, production (all tracks); synthesizer (1, 2, 6), Hammond organ (5)
- Patrick Carney – drums, production (all tracks); bass (1), guitar (1, 4), synthesizer (1–3, 6), percussion (2, 3, 5, 9)

Additional musicians

- Andy Gabbard – background vocals (1–3, 5–10), Wurlitzer (1), piano (7), guitar (5, 7)
- Sam Bacco – percussion (1–7, 9, 10)
- Ray Jacildo – Hammond organ (3, 6); harpsichord, piano (6)
- Sierra Ferrell – background vocals (4)
- Billy F Gibbons – featured guitar (5)

Technical

- Greg Calbi – mastering
- Steve Fallone – mastering
- Tchad Blake – mixing, editing
- Tom Elmhirst – mixing, editing
- Caleb VanBuskirk – engineering
- M. Allen Parker – engineering
- Jonny Ullman – engineering assistance
- McKinley James – engineering assistance
- Tyler Zwiep – engineering assistance

Imagery

- Perry Shall – design and layout
- Jim Herrington – photography

== Charts ==
Chart performance for Dropout Boogie
Chart (2022)	Peak position
Australian Albums (ARIA)	35
Austrian Albums (Ö3 Austria)	7
Belgian Albums (Ultratop Flanders)	9
Belgian Albums (Ultratop Wallonia)	6
Canadian Albums (Billboard)	8
Dutch Albums (Album Top 100)	7
Finnish Albums (Suomen virallinen lista)	27
German Albums (Offizielle Top 100)	11
Hungarian Albums (MAHASZ)	9
Irish Albums (OCC)	33
Italian Albums (FIMI)	42
New Zealand Albums (RMNZ)	6
Polish Albums (ZPAV)	36
Portuguese Albums (AFP)	5
Scottish Albums (OCC)	3
Spanish Albums (PROMUSICAE)	18
Swiss Albums (Schweizer Hitparade)	6
UK Albums (OCC)	5
US Billboard 200	8
US Top Alternative Albums (Billboard)	2
US Top Rock Albums (Billboard)	2
