= Dan Auerbach =

American singer-songwriter and producer

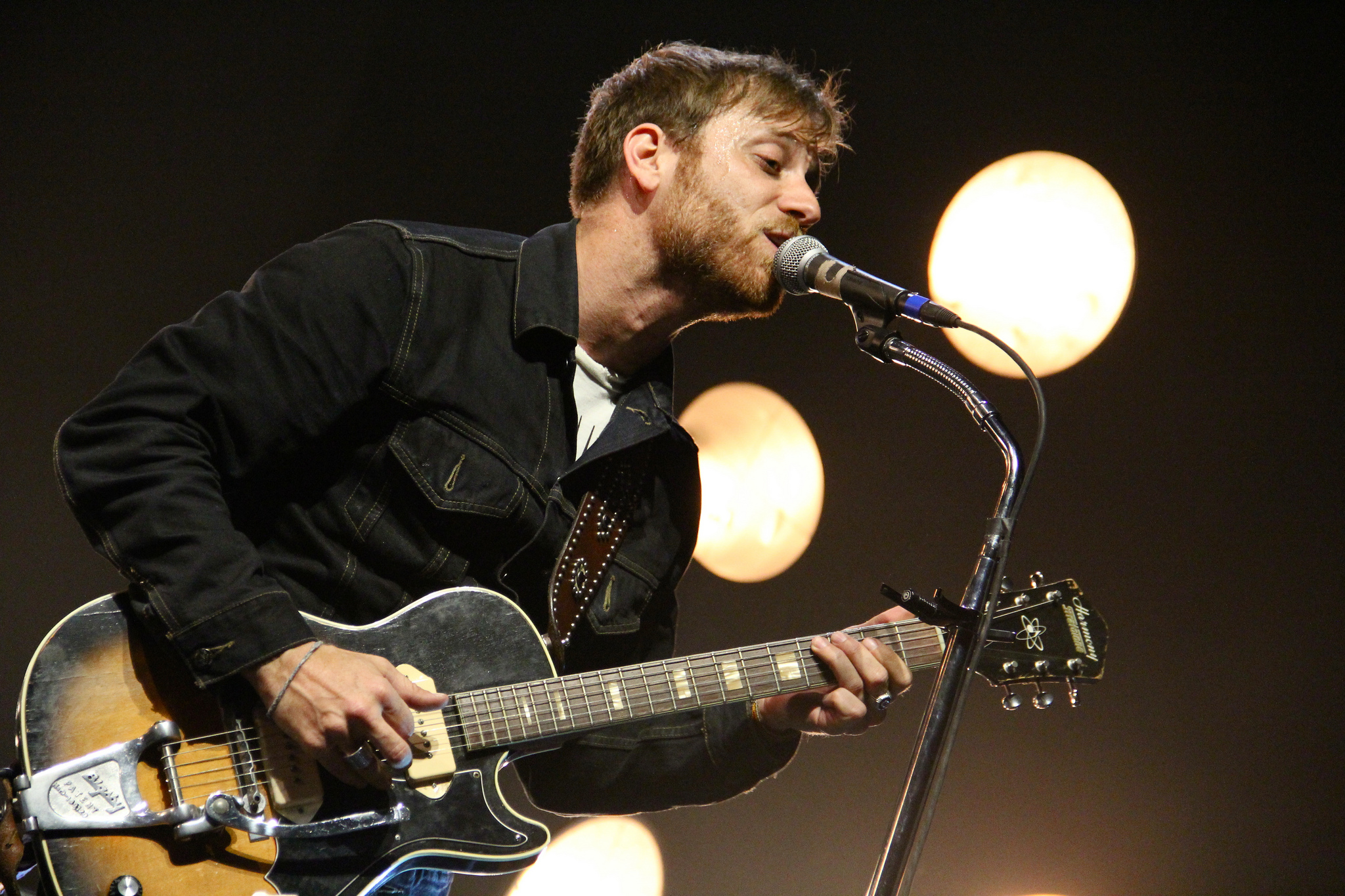
- Auerbach playing with The Black Keys in 2012
- Born: Daniel Quine Auerbach; May 14, 1979 (age 47); Wooster, Ohio, U.S.
- Spouses: Stephanie Gonis (m. 2008; div. 2013); Jen Goodall (m. 2015; div. 2019)
- Children: 2
- Musical career
- Genres: Indie rock; alternative rock; blues rock; garage rock; psychedelic rock; soul
- Occupations: Musician; singer; songwriter
- Instruments: Vocals; guitar; bass; piano; keyboards
- Years active: 1999–present
- Labels: Alive; Fat Possum; Nonesuch; V2; Easy Eye Sound
- Member of: The Black Keys; The Arcs
- Formerly of: The Barnburners
- Website: easyeyesound.com

Daniel Quine Auerbach (/ˈaʊərbɑːk/; born May 14, 1979) is an American musician, singer-songwriter, and record producer, best known as the guitarist and vocalist of The Black Keys, an indie rock band from Akron, Ohio. As a member of the group, Auerbach has recorded and co-produced thirteen studio albums with his bandmate Patrick Carney. Auerbach has also released two solo albums, Keep It Hid (2009) and Waiting on a Song (2017), and formed a side project, the Arcs, which released the albums Yours, Dreamily, (2015) and Electrophonic Chronic (2023).

Auerbach owns the Easy Eye Sound recording studio in Nashville, Tennessee, as well as a record label of the same name. He has produced records by artists such as Cage the Elephant, Dr. John, Lana Del Rey, Miles Kane, Ray LaMontagne, CeeLo Green, Hank Williams Jr and the Pretenders. In addition to winning several Grammy Awards as a member of the Black Keys, Auerbach received the 2013 Grammy Award for Producer of the Year, Non-Classical and was nominated again for the award in 2020, 2021, 2023 and 2026.

== Childhood and early life ==
Auerbach was born in Ohio, and is the son of Mary Little (née Quine; b. about 1948), a teacher of French, and Charles Auerbach (b. 1950-2025), an antique dealer. His father is of Polish Jewish descent and his mother is of part Manx descent. His maternal cousin, twice removed, was philosopher and logician Willard Van Orman Quine, and his second cousin once removed was the late guitarist Robert Quine. Auerbach grew up in a family with musical roots. Auerbach became infatuated with blues after listening to his father's old vinyl records during his childhood. His first concert was Whitney Houston with his mother at the Blossom Music Center in Cuyahoga Falls, Ohio. His second concert was a Grateful Dead show with his father at the Richfield Coliseum in Richfield, Ohio. He was influenced early on by his mother's side of the family, notably his uncles who played bluegrass music.

Auerbach described himself as a normal teenager in high school who smoked marijuana and captained the soccer team at Firestone High School. He attended University of Akron. During college Auerbach was heavily influenced by Junior Kimbrough, eventually resulting in his dropping out to pursue the guitar more seriously. "I've listened to him so much, it's just how I hear it... I studied him so much... Getting F's in college, when I should've been studying, I was listening to Junior Kimbrough's music instead". Other major influences include Robert Johnson, R.L. Burnside, Clarence White, Robert Nighthawk, T-Model Ford, Hound Dog Taylor, Mississippi Fred McDowell, Kokomo Arnold, Son House, and the RZA of Wu-Tang Clan.

== The Black Keys ==
Auerbach and drummer Patrick Carney first met when they were eight or nine years old while living in the same neighborhood of Akron, Ohio. Carney is the nephew of saxophonist Ralph Carney, who performed on several Tom Waits albums. While attending Firestone High School, Carney and Auerbach became friends, though they were part of different crowds. Auerbach was captain of the high school soccer team, while Carney was a social outcast. Encouraged by their brothers, the duo began jamming together in 1996, as Auerbach was learning guitar at the time and Carney owned a four-track recorder and a drum set.

They band started from a demo-recording session in Carney's basement. Auerbach initially went to record a demo with his band at the time but no one showed up. He and Carney then decided that they would just play instead. What came out of that session was ultimately sent out to several labels to try to secure a record deal.

While attending university, Auerbach met and played guitar regularly with fellow Ohio blues musician Patrick Sweany, while also continuing to work on material for The Black Keys with Carney. Sweany was a friend of Auerbach's father, but the younger Auerbach was recommended by a mutual friend, who was impressed by Dan's authenticity when playing the likes of RL Burnside and Junior Kimbrough. Auerbach spent 18 months playing in Sweany's band, mainly playing baritone guitar. One night after a gig, Auerbach played Sweany the mixes for the Black Keys debut album, and he knew that his time in the band was over, stating, "Man, this is really interesting... so um, can you help me train your replacement!?"

After signing with indie label Alive, they released their debut album, The Big Come Up, in 2002, which earned them a new deal with jazz/rock label Fat Possum Records. Their third album, Rubber Factory, was released in 2004 and received critical acclaim; it boosted the band's profile, eventually leading to a record deal with major label Nonesuch Records in 2006. After self-producing and recording their first four records in makeshift studios, in 2008 the duo completed Attack & Release in a professional studio and hired producer Danger Mouse, a frequent collaborator with the band.

The group's commercial breakthrough came in 2010 with Brothers, which along with its single "Tighten Up", won three Grammy Awards including Best Alternative Album of the Year. Their 2011 follow-up, El Camino, received strong reviews and reached number two on the Billboard 200 chart, leading to the first arena concert tour of the band's career, the El Camino Tour. The album and its hit single "Lonely Boy" won three Grammy Awards. In 2014, they released their eighth album, Turn Blue, their first number-one record in the US, Canada, and Australia.

After the touring for Turn Blue concluded, Auerbach and Carney took a break from The Black Keys. Both Auerbach and Carney have been on record talking about needing a break from the constant working process. Carney said, "I love making music with Dan and I'm excited for when we do that next, and we will do it. But both of us have PTSD from being on the road constantly". Auerbach added, "You can't just keep doing it, because it'll suck your brain dry".

After their hiatus, The Black Keys returned in 2019 with the album Let's Rock produced by [The Black Keys] with the chart-topping single "Lo/Hi". This was followed by 2021's Delta Kream, which consisted of blues covers performed with guitarist Kenny Brown and bassist Eric Deaton.

In 2022, The Black Keys announced Dropout Boogie.

== Other performances and bands ==
=== The Barnburners ===
Auerbach was a member of a band called The Barnburners before forming The Black Keys in 2001. The Barnburners included Auerbach, Jason Edwards and Kip Amore. The Barnburners were a blues-based band that performed in Northeast Ohio clubs and released a 6-track album called The Rawboogie EP. The album includes the Junior Kimbrough song "Meet Me in the City", which Auerbach later covered with The Black Keys on their Chulahoma tribute studio album.

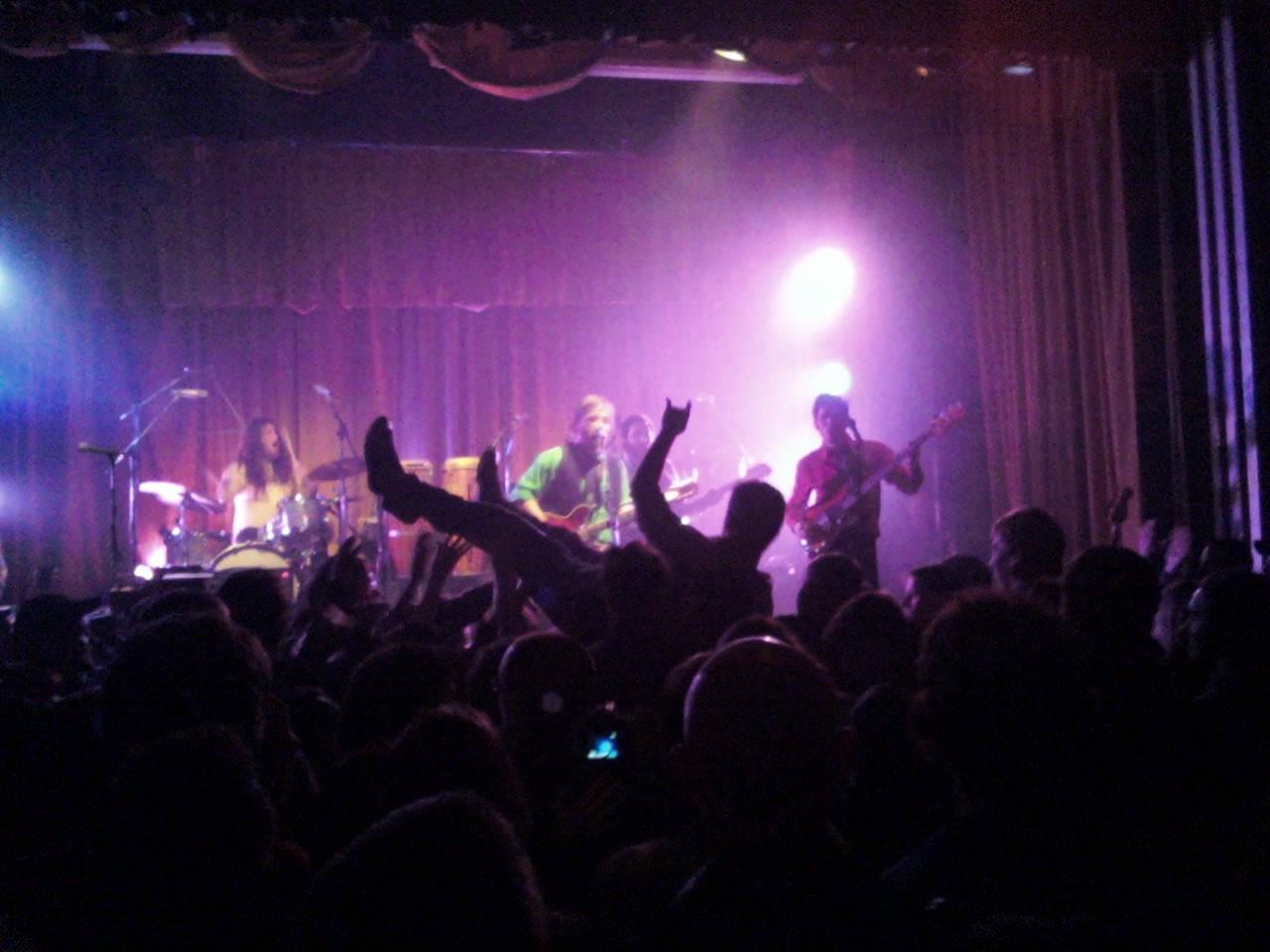
Dan Auerbach and the Fast Five playing the Beachland Ballroom in Cleveland, Ohio on March 5, 2009.

=== The Fast Five ===
The band Fast Five toured with Auerbach in 2009. The Fast Five's other members drew from the band Hacienda and percussionist Patrick Hallahan from My Morning Jacket. The original percussionist, Bob Cesare, was unable to perform with the Fast Five because of a death in his family.

Auerbach and fellow Black Keys member Patrick Carney first met the members of Hacienda at Emo's, a club in Austin, Texas, while watching a band during the Austin City Limits Music Festival. Upon seeing one of the Hacienda band members hit on an intoxicated woman, Carney walked over and leaned in saying, "Dude, trust me, that's a bad idea." After becoming acquainted with each other, Auerbach e-mailed Hacienda a month later asking for more demos, which eventually led them to being asked to open for The Black Keys and Dr. Dog at a show in Austin, Texas. Afterward, Auerbach asked Hacienda to travel to Akron, Ohio where they would be his "guinea pigs" while recording Keep It Hid.

=== Blakroc ===
Blakroc was a studio album and collaboration by Auerbach and Carney of the Black Keys and Damon Dash, co-founder and former co-owner of Roc-A-Fella Records, who oversaw the project. The album featured a plethora of guest appearances from several indie and popular hip hop and R&B acts, namely Mos Def; Nicole Wray; Pharoahe Monch; Ludacris, Billy Danze of M.O.P.; Q-Tip of A Tribe Called Quest; Jim Jones; and NOE of ByrdGang; as well as Raekwon, RZA, and the late Ol' Dirty Bastard of Wu-Tang Clan.

=== The Arcs ===
In 2015, Auerbach announced the formation of a new musical group known as The Arcs. Auerbach said about the band: "I just wanted to do my thing and get extra weird. I wanted everything to flow [and] be cohesive. It's basically everything I love about music all wrapped up into one record".

The debut album, Yours, Dreamily, was released later in the summer of 2015.

During the Bataclan Theatre massacre, Auerbach and his band The Arcs were performing at the similarly sized nearby venue Le Trianon. Auerbach subsequently stated, "I know people that were there last night. I know people who are like, ‘What am I gonna do – see the Arcs or the Eagles of Death Metal?' And I've woken up feeling very out of sorts. What do you call it, survivor's remorse? Why the hell did it happen there and not where we were playing? I'm just so brokenhearted about all those people."

On July 3, 2018, Richard Swift, the multi-instrumentalist and singer-songwriter who was a member of the Arcs, died at the age of 41. Swift and Auerbach were very close friends, with Auerbach describing Swift as "one of the most talented musicians I know".

The Arcs released their second album, Electrophonic Chronic, in January 2023.

=== Robert Finley ===
In 2017, blues musician Robert Finley got connected with Auerbach, and the pair released an original soundtrack for the graphic novel Murder Ballads, published by z2 Comics. Shortly after the release of the Murder Ballads soundtrack, Billboard announced that Finley would be releasing a full-length album produced and co-written by Auerbach.

The album, Goin' Platinum!, was released on Auerbach's Easy Eye Sound (Nonesuch Records) on December 8, 2017. The following year Finley joined Auerbach's Easy Eye Sound Revue tour.

In 2021, Finley announced the album Sharecropper's Son, to be released May 21, 2021 on Easy Eye Sound. The album is autobiographical in nature, and centers on Finley's upbringing on a crop share in Louisiana, and was produced by Auerbach.

== Easy Eye Sound ==
In addition to his work as a performer, Auerbach founded Easy Eye Sound, a Nashville-based recording studio and record label that was developed during a period when the Black Keys were on hiatus. The studio operates with a philosophy emphasizing live recording with minimal overdubbing, drawing inspiration from mid-20th-century recording practices. Auerbach has described the studio as a place where artists are invited to write and record intensively over short periods, encouraging an approach to songwriting that prioritizes collective over individual authorship.

== Awards and honors ==
The Black Keys' 2010 album, Brothers, won three Grammy awards. At the 2013 Grammy Awards, Auerbach won the award for Producer of the Year, Non-Classical, for work on The Black Keys album El Camino, as well as those of Dr. John and Hacienda. Auerbach was nominated three further times in 2020, 2021 and 2023.

Also at the 2013 Grammy Awards, Auerbach won the award for Best Rock Song for his song "Lonely Boy", Best Rock Performance for "Lonely Boy", and Best Rock Album for El Camino. He also produced the 2015 Cage the Elephant album Tell Me I'm Pretty which won Best Rock Album at the 59th Annual Grammy Awards on February 12, 2017.

In 2010, he joined the 9th annual Independent Music Awards judging panel to assist independent musicians' careers.

== Personal life ==
Auerbach first married Stephanie Gonis, with whom he has a daughter, Sadie Little Auerbach, born in 2008. In 2013, they were divorced.

Auerbach, Patrick Carney, and Jack White have been involved in several public feuds. The roots of the conflict date back to 2012, when White banned Auerbach from his Nashville studio. They have since made amends and are now on good terms.

In 2010, Auerbach moved from Akron, Ohio to Nashville, Tennessee. He moved his record label Easy Eye Sound and bought a studio. Auerbach has described Nashville as not just being "a little tourist music spot" but much more. As Auerbach grew older he realized Nashville was "the spot I wanted to go to. There's the most music that I felt a connection to".

In September 2015, Auerbach married Jen Goodall with whom he has a son, Early, born in June 2015. They divorced in 2019.

== Discography ==
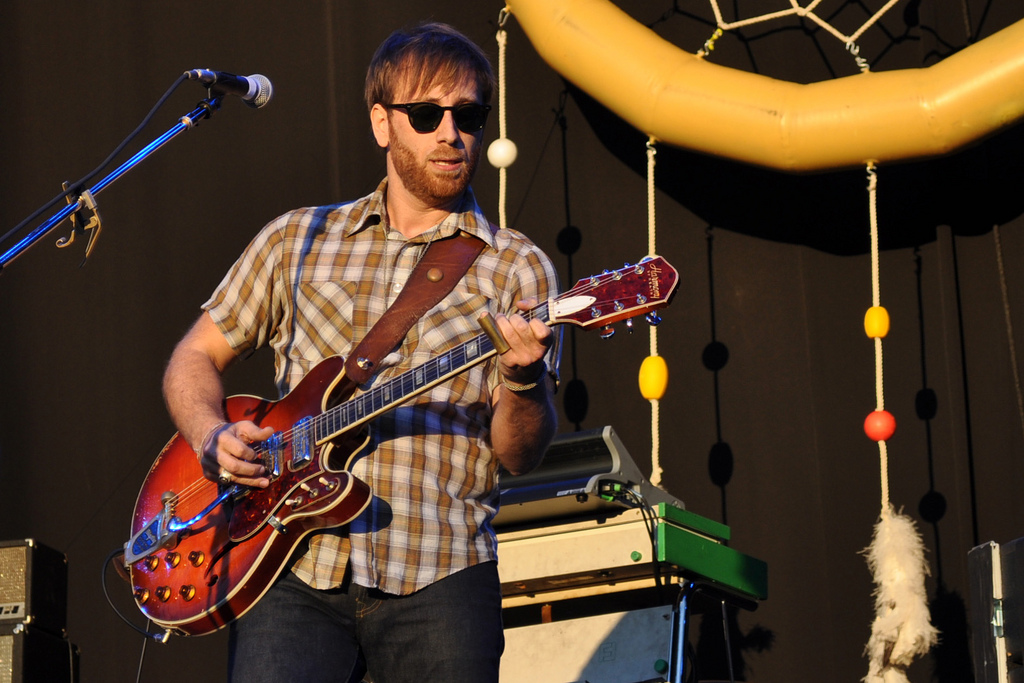
Dan Auerbach of the Black Keys playing at Music Midtown in 2011

Solo albums

- Keep It Hid (2009)
- Waiting on a Song (2017)

Solo singles

- "I Want Some More" (2009)
- "Heartbroken, In Disrepair" (2009)
- "Shine on Me" (2017)
- "Waiting on a Song" (12", Ltd, Bar / 2017)
- "Stand by My Girl" (2017)
- "King of a One Horse Town" (Digital / 2017)

with The Black Keys

- The Big Come Up (2002)
- Thickfreakness (2003)
- Rubber Factory (2004)
- Chulahoma (2006)
- Magic Potion (2006)
- Attack & Release (2008)
- Brothers (2010)
- El Camino (2011)
- Turn Blue (2014)
- Let's Rock (2019)
- Delta Kream (2021)
- Dropout Boogie (2022)
- Ohio Players (2024)
- No Rain, No Flowers (2025)

with Blakroc

- Blakroc (2009)

with The Arcs

- Yours, Dreamily, (2015)
- The Arcs vs. The Inventors Vol. I (2015)
- Electrophonic Chronic (2023)

== Musical collaborations ==
Artist	Album	Role	Year
SSM	EP1	Recorded, Engineered	2006
SSM	SSM	Recorded, Engineered	2006
Patrick Sweany	C'mon C'mere	Guitar on "One More Time"	2006
Brimstone Howl	Guts of Steel	Producer, engineer, mixer	2007
John Doe	A Year in the Wilderness	Guitar	2007
Nathaniel Mayer	Why Don't You Give It To Me	Co-producer, co-mixer, Guitar, Drums, Vocals	2007
Radio Moscow	Radio Moscow	Producer, engineer, mixer, Acoustic Guitar	2007
Patrick Sweany	Every Hour Is a Dollar Gone	Producer, engineer, mixer	2007
Black Diamond Heavies	A Touch of Someone Else's Class	Producer, engineer, mixer	2008
Buffalo Killers	Let It Ride	Producer, engineer, mixer	2008
Hacienda	Loud Is The Night	Producer, engineer, mixer, BG Vocals, Guitar	2008
Jessica Lea Mayfield	With Blasphemy So Heartfelt	Producer, engineer, Mixer, arranger, Acoustic and Electric Guitars, Bass, Drums, BG Vocals, Piano, Synthesizer, Hammond Organ, Toy Piano, Lap Steel, Percussion	2008
The Ettes	Danger Is EP	Producer, engineer, mixer	2009
The Ettes	Do You Want Power	Producer, engineer, mixer, Piano on "No Home"	2009
Nathaniel Mayer	Why Won't You Let Me Be Black?	Co-producer, co-mixer, Guitar, Vocals	2009
Hacienda	Big Red & Barbacoa	Producer, engineer, mixer	2010
Cadillac Sky	Letters in the Deep	Producer, engineer, mixer, Waterphone, Vocals	2010
Parting Gifts	Strychnine Dandelion	Guitar	2010
Shivering Timbers	We All Started in the Same Place	Producer, engineer, Drums, mixer	2010
Jessica Lea Mayfield	Tell Me	Drum Loop, engineer, Guitar (Acoustic), Moog Synthesizer, producer, composer, Vocals	2011
Brian Olive	Two of Everything	Engineer, Mixing, producer, BG Vocals	2011
Reigning Sound	Abdication... For Your Love	Producer	2011
Dr. John	Locked Down	Producer, Guitar, Percussion & Background Vocals	2012
Hacienda	Shakedown	Producer	2012
JEFF the Brotherhood	Hypnotic Nights	Mixing, producer, BG Vocals	2012
Grace Potter & the Nocturnals	The Lion the Beast the Beat	Composer, Handclapping, producer, Vocals	2012
The Growlers	Hung at Heart	Producer	2013
Hanni El Khatib	Head in the Dirt	Producer, Bass, Guitar, Background Vocals, Percussion	2013
Bombino	Nomad	Producer	2013
Connie Britton	The Music of Nashville: Season 1 Volume 2	Producer, guitar and vocals on "Bitter Memory"	2013
Valerie June	Pushin' Against a Stone	Co-producer, guitar and vocals on "Wanna Be On Your Mind"	2013
Ray LaMontagne	Supernova	Producer	2014
Lana Del Rey	Ultraviolence	Producer, handclaps, shaker, electric guitar, 12-string acoustic guitar, synthesizer	2014
Nikki Lane	All or Nothin	Producer	2014
Lee Fields	Emma Jean	Guitar, vocals	2014
Cage the Elephant	Tell Me I'm Pretty	Producer and co-writer on "Trouble"	2015
A$AP Rocky	At. Long. Last. ASAP	Guitar	2015
The Pretenders	Alone	Producer, writer, guitar	2016
Robert Finley	Goin' Platinum	Producer, composer, guitar	2017
Jake Bugg	Hearts That Strain	Composer, guitar	2017
Shannon and the Clams	Onion	Producer	2018
Sonny Smith	Rod for Your Love	Producer	2018
La Luz	Floating Features	Producer	2018
Shannon Shaw	Shannon in Nashville	Producer, composer, guitar	2018
Gibson Brothers	Mockingbird	Producer	2018
Chuck Auerbach	Remember Me	Guitar, producer	2018
Night Beats	Myth of a Man	Producer	2019
Dee White	Southern Gentleman	Producer, composer, guitar	2019
Yola	Walk Through Fire	Producer, Musician	2019
Leo Bud Welch	The Angels in Heaven Done Signed My Name	Producer	2019
Kendell Marvel	Solid Gold Sounds	Producer	2019
Jimmy "Duck" Holmes	Cypress Grove	Producer, composer, guitar	2019
Purple Mountains	Purple Mountains	Co-writer on "Maybe I'm the Only One for Me"	2019
The Cactus Blossoms	Easy Way	Co-writer on "Got a Lotta Love" and "Blue as the Ocean"	2019
Marcus King	El Dorado	Producer	2020
Early James	Singing for My Supper	Producer	2020
John Anderson	Years	Producer	2020
CeeLo Green	CeeLo Green Is Thomas Callaway	Producer	2020
Zella Day	Where Does the Devil Hide	Producer	2020
Aaron Frazer	Introducing...	Producer, backing vocals, guitar	2021
Tony Joe White	Smoke From the Chimney	Producer, percussion, guitar	2021
Robert Finley	Sharecropper's Son	Producer, composer, guitar	2021
Yola	Stand for Myself	Producer, composer, percussion, guitar	2021
Shannon and the Clams	Year of the Spider	Producer	2021
The Velveteers	Nightmare Daydream	Producer, composer, guitar, percussion	2021
Ceramic Animal	Sweet Unknown	Producer, composer, guitar	2022
Son House	Forever on my Mind	Producer	2022
Hank Williams Jr.	Rich White Honky Blues	Producer, backing vocals, percussion, guitar, slide guitar	2022
Various Artists	Something Borrowed, Something New: A Tribute to John Anderson	Producer	2022
Early James	Strange Time To Be Alive	Producer, composer	2022
Marcus King	Young Blood	Producer, composer, guitar	2022
Hermanos Gutiérrez	El Bueno y el Malo	Producer, mixing	2022
Robert Finley	Black Bayou	Producer, handclaps, composer, percussion, guitar	2023
Nat Myers	Yellow Peril	Producer	2023
Various Artists	Tell Everybody! (21st Century Juke Joint Blues)	Producer	2023
Shannon and the Clams	The Moon is in the Wrong Place	Producer	2024
Hermanos Gutiérrez	Sonido Cosmico	Producer, mixing	2024
Britti	Hello, I'm Britti	Producer, mixing	2024
Jon Muq	Flying Away	Producer, mixing	2024
Jeremie Albino	Our Time In The Sun	Producer	2024
Early James	Medium Raw	Producer, mixing	2025
The Velveteers	A Million Knives	Producer, mixing	2025
Moonrisers	Harsh & Exciting	Producer, mixing	2025
Robert Finley	Hallelujah! Don't Let The Devil Fool Ya	Producer, mixing	2025
Miles Kane	Sunlight in the Shadows	Producer, mixing	2025
Leah Blevins	All Dressed Up	Producer, mixing	2026
Gnarls Barkley	Atlanta	bass, guitar on "I Amnesia"	2026
Fai Laci	Elephant in the Room	Producer, mixing	2026
The Animeros	¡Qué Bárbaro!	Producer, mixing	2026
Hermanos Gutiérrez	Los Ojos Del Cóndor	Producer, mixing	2026
Eddie 9V	Down Here	Producer, mixing	2026

== Musical equipment ==
=== Guitars ===
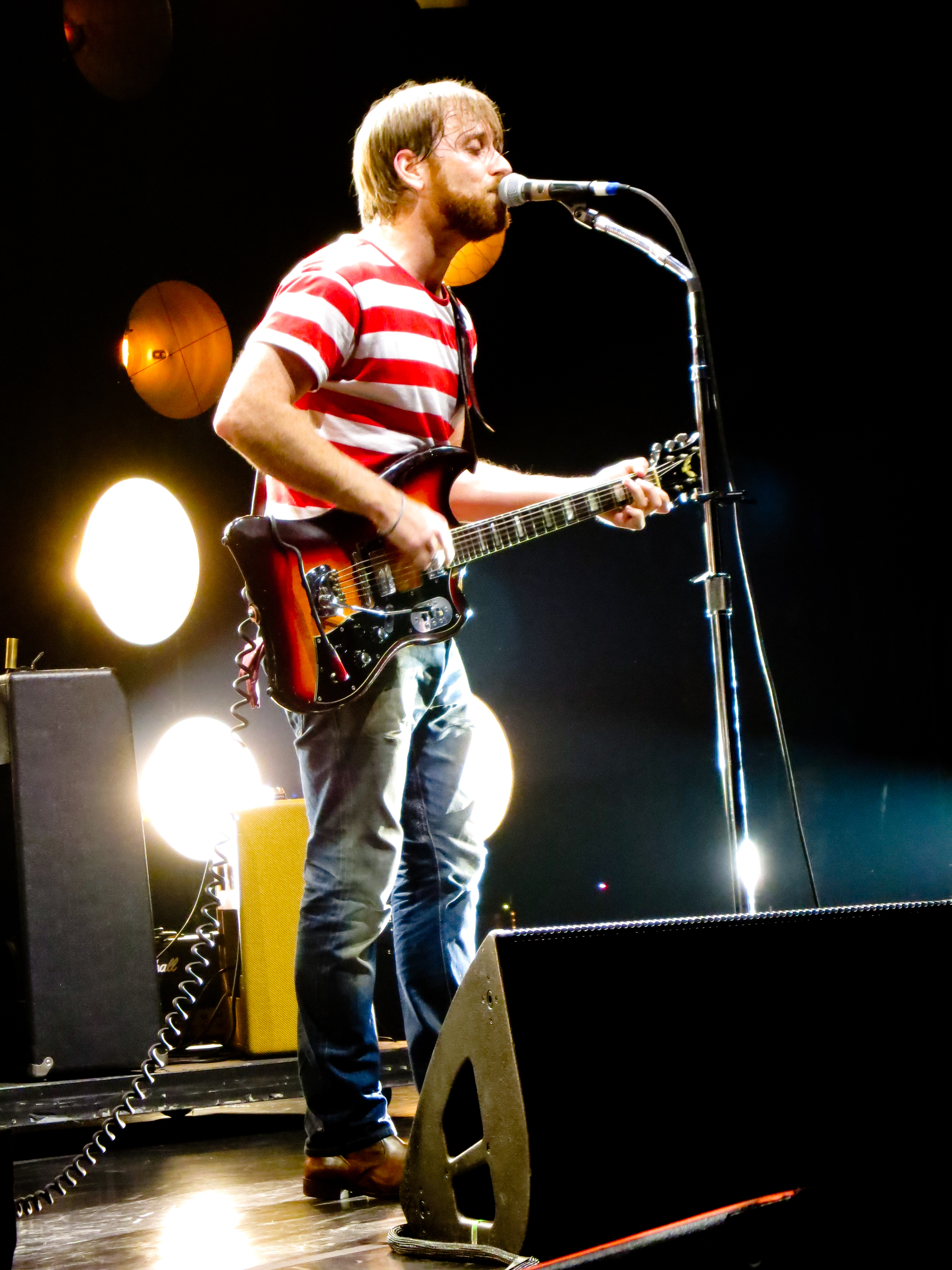
Auerbach at Madison Square Garden in 2012

- Fender Jerry Donahue Telecaster
- Harmony Stratotone H47
- Harmony H78 Hollowbody
- Harmony Heath TG-46
- Harmony Rocket
- Höfner 176 Galaxie
- Gibson Firebird VII
- 70's Gibson Les Paul Deluxe
- 60's Gibson SG Junior
- Guild Thunderbird (S-200 T-Bird)
- Supro Martinique
- Silvertone U1
- Silvertone 1454
- Rickenbacker 360
- Ibanez SG copy
- Ibanez Rocket Roll[flying v copy]
- National Map
- Teisco Del Rey SS-4L
- Reverend Flatroc

=== Amplification ===
- Fender Quad Reverb
- Marshall JTM45 and vintage Marshall 8x10 cab
- Fender '65 Twin Reverb Reissue
- Fender Musicmaster Bass
- Fender Super Reverb
- Victoria Double Deluxe
- 1960s Fender blackface Princeton
- 1963 Fender Vibroverb

=== Effects ===
- Ibanez Standard Fuzz
- Sovtek Big Muff
- Earthquaker Devices Hoof Fuzz
- Gibson Maestro Fuzz Tone
- Tubeplex tape delay
- Fulltone Tape Echo
- Boss TR-2 Tremolo
- Analogman Sunface
- Boss Super Shifter
- Boss Super Octave
- Nu Wah Fuzz Wah
