= Jeremie Albino =

Canadian musician

Jeremie Albino is a Canadian roots rock singer-songwriter from Toronto, Ontario.

The son of a Filipino father and a Québécois mother, he grew up in the Scarborough district of Toronto. After honing his musical skills while working on farms in Prince Edward County for a number of years, Albino released his debut album Hard Time in 2019. In 2021 he followed up with Blue Blue Blue, a collaborative album recorded with Cat Clyde.

His second album, Tears You Hide, was released in 2023. The album was supported with his first headlining tour of both Canada and the United States.

His third album, Our Time in the Sun, followed in 2024, and was produced by Albino and Dan Auerbach.
