= Delta Kream =

Studio album by the Black Keys
- Released: May 14, 2021
- Recorded: December 2019
- Studios: Easy Eye (Nashville, Tennessee)
- Genre: Hill country blues
- Length: 54:15
- Labels: Easy Eye Sound; Nonesuch
- Producers: Dan Auerbach; Patrick Carney

The Black Keys chronology
Let's Rock (2019)	Delta Kream (2021)	Dropout Boogie (2022)

Singles from Delta Kream
- 1. "Crawling Kingsnake" Released: April 20, 2021

Professional ratings
Aggregate scores
Source	Rating
Metacritic	75/100
Review scores
Source	Rating
AllMusic	3.5/5 stars
DIY	3/5 stars
Entertainment Weekly	B
NME	3/5 stars
Pitchfork	6.8/10

Delta Kream is the tenth studio album by American rock duo the Black Keys, released through Easy Eye Sound and Nonesuch Records on May 14, 2021. It is a cover album of hill country blues songs. It was preceded by the April 15 release of a cover of "Crawling Kingsnake", based on Junior Kimbrough's rendition.

== Background, recording and packaging ==
The album was recorded "in about 10 hours" over two afternoons at Dan Auerbach's Easy Eye Sound studio in Nashville at the end of the Let's Rock tour, with little planning and no advance rehearsals. It includes contributions from R. L. Burnside's guitarist Kenny Brown as well as Junior Kimbrough's bassist Eric Deaton; the Black Keys had previously covered Burnside's "Skinny Woman" (titled "Busted") and Kimbrough's "Do the Romp" (titled "Do the Rump") on their 2002 debut album The Big Come Up, and released the Kimbrough tribute album Chulahoma: The Songs of Junior Kimbrough in 2006. Brown and Deaton had been recording at Easy Eye Sound studio concurrently along with Auerbach for the album Sharecropper's Son by Robert Finley, which lead to their availability for the Delta Kream sessions.

In a statement, Auerbach said: "We made this record to honor the Mississippi hill country blues tradition that influenced us starting out. These songs are still as important to us today as they were the first day Pat and I started playing together and picked up our instruments."

The album cover features a 1970s photograph by William Eggleston of the Delta Kream shop in Tunica, Mississippi, with an Oldsmobile Cutlass parked outside – the shop no longer exists.

== Promotion and release ==
The Black Keys announced Delta Kream on April 13, 2021, exclusively through their Lonely Boys and Girls fan club. Through the fan club, on the same day, they also released the album's lead single, a cover of Junior Kimbrough's version of "Crawling Kingsnake". It was released to digital music platforms two days later. Additionally, a music video for the song was released. Directed by Tim Hardiman, it features a performance of the song by the band at the Blue Front Cafe, owned by blues musician Jimmy "Duck" Holmes.

Delta Kream was released on May 14, 2021, through Easy Eye Sound and Nonesuch Records on digital music platforms and physical media. The album's digital release includes a shortened edit of "Crawling Kingsnake" as a bonus track. Physically, the album was made available to purchase as both a CD and double 12-inch vinyl record, with standard black, limited edition "purple haze", and Spotify user-exclusive pink options available for the vinyl release.

== Track listing ==
Delta Kream track listing
No.	Title	Credited songwriters	Length
1.	"Crawling Kingsnake"	John Lee Hooker, Bernard Besman	6:08
2.	"Louise"	Johnnie Temple	4:23
3.	"Poor Boy a Long Way from Home"	R. L. Burnside	4:08
4.	"Stay All Night"	Junior Kimbrough	5:44
5.	"Going Down South"	R. L. Burnside	3:48
6.	"Coal Black Mattie"	Ranie Burnette	3:48
7.	"Do the Romp"	Junior Kimbrough	5:01
8.	"Sad Days, Lonely Nights"	Junior Kimbrough	5:57
9.	"Walk with Me"	Junior Kimbrough	5:36
10.	"Mellow Peaches"	Big Joe Williams	3:47
11.	"Come On and Go with Me"	Junior Kimbrough	5:55
Total length:			54:15

Digital bonus track
No.	Title	Credited songwriters	Length
12.	"Crawling Kingsnake" (edit)	John Lee Hooker, Bernard Besman	3:52
Total length:			58:07

== Personnel ==
The Black Keys

- Dan Auerbach – lead vocals, electric guitar, production
- Patrick Carney – drums, percussion, production

Additional personnel

- Eric Deaton – bass
- Kenny Brown – electric guitar
- Sam Bacco – additional percussion
- Ryan Smith – mastering
- Tchad Blake – mixing
- M. Allen Parker – engineering
- Caleb VanBuskirk – additional engineering
- Michael Deano – engineering assistance
- Mickey Smay – engineering assistance

== Charts ==
=== Weekly charts ===
Chart performance for Delta Kream
Chart (2021)	Peak position
Australian Albums (ARIA)	8
Austrian Albums (Ö3 Austria)	3
Belgian Albums (Ultratop Flanders)	2
Belgian Albums (Ultratop Wallonia)	2
Canadian Albums (Billboard)	12
Croatian International Albums (HDU)	1
Danish Albums (Hitlisten)	22
Dutch Albums (Album Top 100)	2
Finnish Albums (Suomen virallinen lista)	6
French Albums (SNEP)	6
German Albums (Offizielle Top 100)	3
Hungarian Albums (MAHASZ)	3
Irish Albums (Official Charts)	23
Italian Albums (FIMI)	20
New Zealand Albums (RMNZ)	5
Norwegian Albums (VG-lista)	34
Polish Albums (ZPAV)	25
Portuguese Albums (AFP)	4
Scottish Albums (Official Charts)	4
Swedish Physical Albums (Sverigetopplistan)	4
Swiss Albums (Schweizer Hitparade)	3
UK Albums (Official Charts)	5
US Billboard 200	6
US Top Alternative Albums (Billboard)	1
US Top Rock Albums (Billboard)	1

=== Year-end charts ===
Year-end chart performance for Delta Kream
Chart (2021)	Position
Belgian Albums (Ultratop Flanders)	174
Swiss Albums (Schweizer Hitparade)	97
US Top Rock Albums (Billboard)	76
