= Jessica Lea Mayfield =

American singer-songwriter

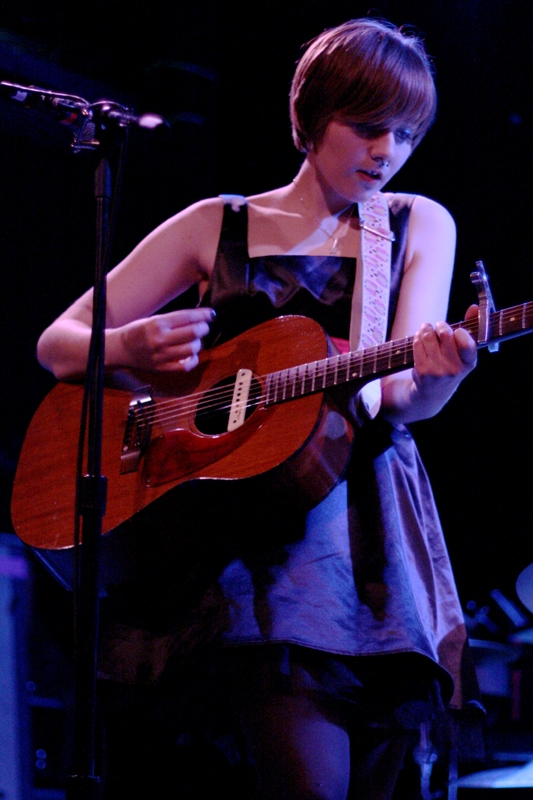
- Jessica Lea Mayfield at Bowery Ballroom, 2009

Background information
- Born: Jessica Lea Mayfield; 27 August 1989 (age 37); Ravenna, Ohio, United States
- Genres: Indie rock, alternative country, folk rock
- Occupations: Musician, songwriter
- Instruments: Vocals, acoustic guitar, electric guitar
- Years active: 2000–present
- Website: www.jessicaleamayfieldofficial.com

Jessica Lea Mayfield (born August 27, 1989) is an American singer-songwriter from Kent, Ohio, United States. She is known for her ominous song writing, with a plaintive minimalist style that draws on both country and rock music.

== Early years ==
Mayfield first performed with her family bluegrass band One Way Rider at the age of 8. They began touring as a family band, boarding a 1956 tour bus (once belonging to Bill Monroe, Kitty Wells, and Ernest Tubb) and headed south from Ohio to Tennessee. At age 11, Mayfield began playing guitar and writing songs.

== Studio work ==
=== White Lies ===
At age 15, Mayfield recorded the 2005 EP White Lies under the name Chittlin with her brother David Mayfield. The release was self-pressed in a single run of 100 copies, and Dan Auerbach of The Black Keys later discovered Mayfield through the EP. Auerbach and Mayfield subsequently began recording what became her debut album, With Blasphemy So Heartfelt.

=== With Blasphemy So Heartfelt ===
Mayfield's first LP was the September 16, 2008 release With Blasphemy So Heartfelt. The album was produced by Auerbach and recorded over a two-year span in his home studio in Akron. With Blasphemy So Heartfelt features Mayfield on acoustic guitar and vocals, Auerbach on a variety of instrumentation, and Mayfield's brother David on upright bass. Dr. Dog’s Scott McMicken and Frank McElroy provide vocal harmonies on the track “I’m Not Lonely Anymore.” Says Auerbach of the recording experience, “I think she’s dark and moody in a mysterious way, not unlike Nick Cave and the Bad Seeds.” He adds, “I’m just always really excited to make music with her.”

With Blasphemy So Heartfelt debuted with quite a buzz around it. Pitchfork Media gave the record a rating of 8.2 out of 10. Online magazine Blurt named With Blasphemy the Best Album of 2008 and gave Mayfield the title of Best New Artist of 2008. The album's opening track "Kiss Me Again" was featured on The CW's hit series Gossip Girl on February 2, 2009, and "Bible Days" was featured on CBS's CSI: NY. "For Today" is featured on the Starbucks compilation Have You Heard?: Winter '09. Mayfield's cover of the Buddy Holly song "Words of Love" is featured on the Starbucks compilation Sweetheart: Our Favorite Artists Sing Their Favorite Love Songs.

=== Tell Me ===
Mayfield released her second LP Tell Me on February 8, 2011; with her song “Our Hearts Are Wrong” being featured on the hit TV show, Pretty Little Liars.

=== Make My Head Sing ===
Mayfield released her alternative rock album "Make My Head Sing" in 2014. Pitchfork said, "Jessica Lea Mayfield’s third album opens with the loud, percussive crunch and grind of an electric guitar, thudding loudly and precipitously— Co-producing with her bass player and husband Jesse Newport, Mayfield keeps the sound loose and roomy, preserving the effect of three musicians huddled in a cramped practice space. There’s something certainly compelling about this raw, minimalist sound." The album is her first without Auerbach's influence.

=== Seth Avett and Jessica Lea Mayfield Sing Elliott Smith ===
Mayfield and Seth Avett of the Avett Brothers released an album of Elliott Smith cover songs in 2015.

=== Collaborations ===
In 2007, Mayfield lent her voice to the track "Things Ain't Like They Used To Be" on The Black Keys' album Attack & Release produced by Danger Mouse, making her the first guest vocalist to appear on any record released by The Black Keys.

Mayfield collaborated with Auerbach again on his 2009 debut solo release Keep It Hid, lending her vocals to the track "When the Night Comes".

On June 3, 2026, Mayfield, with Dolour, released Pinkerton, a cover of the album of the same name originally by Weezer.

=== Sorry is Gone ===
On September 29, 2017, Mayfield's fourth studio LP Sorry Is Gone was released by ATO Records: with the exception of the song "Offa My Hands", which was written and produced by Patrick Damphier, who has worked with The Mynabirds and The Arcs, the album was produced by John Agnello, who has worked with Dinosaur Jr and Sonic Youth, and includes appearances by Seth Avett and Steve Shelley of Sonic Youth. Sorry is Gone was another nod to Mayfield's grunge-alternative influences, while incorporating some alt-country and pop elements as well.

The deeply personal album chronicles Mayfield's years-long journey as a survivor of domestic abuse, and separation from her abusive husband: "I feel like it’s almost my duty and my responsibility to advocate for this subject. Because if I really want things to change and I want women to be treated more fairly, then hiding my own experiences isn’t going to help anyone."

== Touring ==
In addition to opening for many artists, including The Black Keys, The Avett Brothers, Cake, Band of Horses, Ryan Adams, Ray LaMontagne, and Jay Farrar (Son Volt, Uncle Tupelo), Mayfield has frequently toured as a headliner, and performed at the Blossom Music Center in Cuyahoga Falls, Ohio as part of A Prairie Home Companion in July 2010.

== Discography ==
=== Studio albums ===
- 2008: With Blasphemy So Heartfelt
- 2011: Tell Me
- 2014: Make My Head Sing
- 2017: Sorry Is Gone
- 2026: Miss Obliteration

=== Singles ===
- "Kiss Me Again" (2008)
- "Our Hearts Are Wrong" (2010)
- "I Want to Love You" (2014)
- "Sorry is Gone" (2017)
- "Meadow" (2017)
- "Emotional Abandonment" (2020)
- "Can You Feel It?" (2021)

=== EPs ===
- 2006: White Lies
- 2010: Live (10", EP)
- 2025: Choose Myself EP

=== Collaborations and appearances ===
- 2008: The Black Keys: Attack & Release
- 2009: Sweetheart: Our Favorite Artists Sing Their Favorite Love Songs (Various Artists)
- 2009: Dan Auerbach: Keep It Hid:
- 2011: My Favorite Gifts: Christmas Album: (Various Artists)
- 2011: Newermind: "Lounge Act"
- 2013: The Avett Brothers: Magpie and the Dandelion
- 2013: High Cotton: A Tribute To Alabama (Various Artists)
- 2015: Seth Avett and Jessica Lea Mayfield Sing Elliott Smith
- 2022: Alex G: God Save the Animals
- 2026: Jessica Lea Mayfield x Dolour: Pinkerton
