= Patrick Sweany =

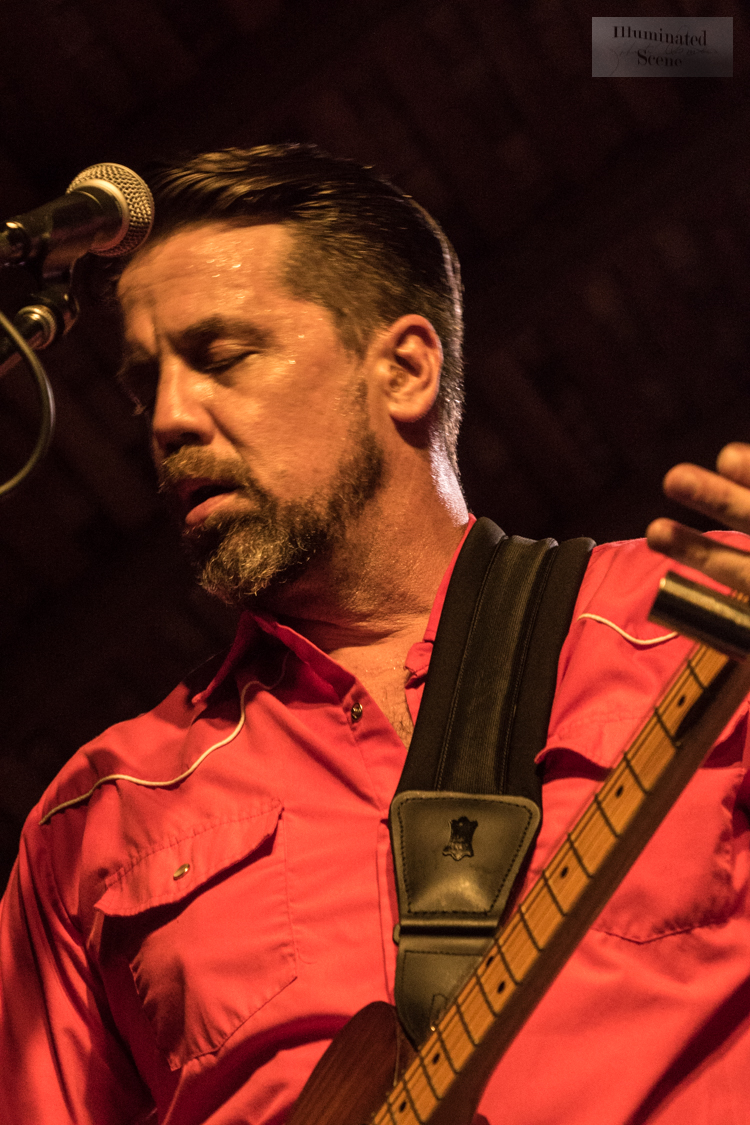

Background information
- Born: Patrick R. Sweany; April 26, 1974 (age 51); Massillon, Ohio, United States
- Genres: Americana, blues
- Occupation(s): Entertainer, singer, guitarist, songwriter
- Instrument(s): Guitar, banjo
- Years active: 1990s–present
- Labels: Ayao Records, Nine Mile Records
- Website: www.patricksweany.com

Patrick Sweany (born April 26, 1974) is an American blues rock musician from Massillon, Ohio, United States.

== Career ==
Patrick Sweany first gained prominence in the late 1990s as an acoustic blues guitarist and singer at many Blues Festivals around the U.S. His first CD I Wanna Tell You was released in 1999 and drew critical acclaim from prominent musicians such as Roy Book Binder and Jimmy Thackery. In 2001, Sweany formed an electric trio called The Patrick Sweany Band. The band included drummer Clint Alguire, and has featured a revolving cast of baritone guitarists, including Dan Auerbach from The Black Keys, Ted Pecchio of Col. Bruce Hampton's The Codetalkers, Bob Basone and Jon Finley. Similarly, Sweany has used many drummers, including Nick Fritsch, Brad Porter, Jon Radford, Jimmy Lester, Adam Abrashoff and Jason Edwards. The omission of a bass player was Sweany's attempt to model the sound of the band after Hound Dog Taylor's HouseRockers.

In 2006, Sweany signed with Nine Mile Records to release C'Mon C'Mere. The CD was co-produced by Dan Auerbach and Jimbo Mathus from Squirrel Nut Zippers and incorporated country music, soul music and 50s era rock and roll into his electric blues stylings.

In June 2007, Sweany released another full-length CD, Every Hour Is A Dollar Gone, again recorded by Dan Auerbach, this time in his newly fashioned Akron Analog studios. Sweany toured throughout the U.S. in support of this release, both headlining and supporting artists such as Sonny Landreth, The Black Keys, Los Straitjackets, The Gourds and Paul Thorn.

In 2009, Sweany moved to East Nashville. In October that year he showcased during the Americana Music Association's annual conference in Nashville.

In February 2011, Sweany released That Old Southern Drag again on Nine Mile Records. The initial tracks were engineered by Scott McEwan, bassist for The Tarbox Ramblers. Additional tracking and overdubs were done at the home studios of Joe V. McMahan, a Nashville guitar player (Webb Wilder, Freedy Johnston, Allison Moorer, Mike Farris). McMahan also got credit as producer. The record did well within Americana circles and Sweany was again invited to showcase at the Americana Music Association's conference in 2011.

Until 2011 Sweany was endorsed by Dean Guitars. In 2012, Sweany signed with Fender Guitars.

In June 2013, Sweany released Close To The Floor on Nine Mile Records. Many of the songs on the record deal with the loss of two close family members the year before. On Close To The Floor, Sweany also continues his association with Joe V. McMahan, with MacMahan acting as engineer and producer and also adding some guitar parts. Other musicians appearing on the record are Ryan Norris on keyboards, Ron Eoff on bass, and Jon Radford on drums.

== Discography ==
- I Wanna Tell You CD (1999 Ayao Records, re-released in 2006 on Nine Mile Records)
- Patrick Sweany Band CD (year unknown - Self-released)
- Merlefest - Live CD (year unknown - Self-released)
- henryfordbedroom CD (2003 Ayao Records)
- Sleeping Bag EP CD (2005 Ayao Records) currently out-of-print
- C'mon C'mere CD (2006 Nine Mile Records)
- Every Hour Is A Dollar Gone CD (2007 Nine Mile Records)
- That Old Southern Drag CD & LP (2011 Nine Mile Records)
- Every Hour Is A Dollar Gone LP (2012 Nine Mile Records)
- Close To The Floor CD & LP (2013 Nine Mile Records)
- Daytime Turned To Nightime CD (2015 Nine Mile Records)
- Ancient Noise CD (2018 Nine Mile Records)
