= Brothers (The Black Keys album) =

Studio album by The Black Keys
- Released: May 18, 2010
- Recorded: 2009
- Studios: Muscle Shoals (Sheffield); The Bunker on Apple (Portland); Home studio (Akron); Soil of the South (La Mesa)
- Genre: Blues rock
- Length: 55:29
- Label: Nonesuch
- Producers: The Black Keys; Mark Neill; Danger Mouse

The Black Keys chronology
Blakroc (2009)	Brothers (2010)	El Camino (2011)

Singles from Brothers
- 1. "Tighten Up" Released: April 23, 2010

Brothers is the sixth studio album by American rock duo the Black Keys, released on May 18, 2010, through Nonesuch Records. It served as the follow-up to Attack & Release (2008), the band's first professionally-recorded and non-self-produced studio album. Brothers was largely produced by the band alongside Mark Neill, with the exception of "Tighten Up" produced by Danger Mouse. The album was recorded in late 2009 at Muscle Shoals Sound Studio in Sheffield, Alabama, Neill's Soil of the South studio in La Mesa, California, the Black Keys' home studio in Akron, Ohio, and the Bunker on Apple in Portland, Oregon.

Prior to recording Brothers, the Black Keys' singer and guitarist Dan Auerbach released Keep It Hid, his first solo studio album, in early 2009. The band's drummer, Patrick Carney, was upset by the release, leading to a brief strife within the band; a tense recent divorce had been the primary source for Carney's anger and depression. After reconciling, the band teamed up with Neill to begin recording a new album. The band continued utilizing a rhythmic approach to songwriting, with recording conditions at the slightly derelict Muscle Shoals leading to minimalistic compositions and an emphasis on the songs' low end. The bulk of the album was recorded at Muscle Shoals, helping to create the album's central sound. The band also sought a more simplistic album package in contrast to their more vivid album covers of years past; Carney's brother Michael was recruited to design the album art.

Brothers had a short pre-release promotional window, with "Tighten Up" being released as its lead single less than a month prior to the album's release. The song became the band's first Billboard Hot 100 appearance, peaking at number 87, and also spent 10 weeks atop on the Billboard Alternative Songs chart. Brothers earned positive reviews and became the band's best-performing album at the time, peaking at number 3 on the Billboard 200 in the US. The songs "Tighten Up" and "Howlin' for You" have been certified platinum in the US by the RIAA, with "Everlasting Light" and "Next Girl" also being certified gold. The album has been certified double-platinum in the US, triple-platinum in Canada, and gold in the UK. At the 53rd Annual Grammy Awards in 2011, the Black Keys received four nominations, winning Best Alternative Music Album for Brothers and Best Rock Performance by a Duo or Group with Vocal for "Tighten Up". Michael Carney additionally won Best Recording Package for his art direction.

== Background ==
Tensions had grown within the band by 2009, and the two embarked on side projects. Guitarist/vocalist Dan Auerbach was introduced to engineer Mark Neill through friend Liam Watson, and with his assistance built his own analogue studio (later named Easy Eye Sound System) at his home in Akron, Ohio; in late 2007, the two convened in Neill's La Mesa, California, home to record. The sessions became Auerbach's solo debut Keep It Hid, which was released in February 2009 on Nonesuch Records to positive reviews. Drummer Patrick Carney, who had not been informed of Auerbach's solo plans, was livid: "Everybody knew but me. I was mad at Dan. I was mad at our manager. I was mad at everybody." Carney was afraid Auerbach had moved on and was on the verge of quitting the band; the two hardly spoke for several months and another Black Keys recording was uncertain. Auerbach, who had played Carney the recordings but failed to mention it would see release, found it increasingly difficult to communicate with the drummer due to his antipathy for Carney's then-wife, Denise Grollmus. Auerbach said, "I really hated her from the start and didn't want anything to do with her."

Carney realized his anger was misdirected as he was coming off a rough divorce. He and Grollmus were married for two years, but together for nine. According to the drummer, his ex-wife slept with his best friend, lied to him for several years and bilked him for money. By the end of the relationship, Carney was depressed, drinking heavily, and had gained 25 pounds. "Homeboy was miserable," Auerbach said of his bandmate "He was being manipulated mentally and emotionally." Carney eventually broke off the relationship with a phone call while his wife was in Europe. Eventually, Auerbach and Carney met to discuss how important the band was to both of them. "Then we hugged and made up and it's been all good ever since," said Auerbach. The duo soon met at Neill's La Mesa home and got to work on several ideas, notably recording "These Days", which would ultimately become the closing track on Brothers. Things moved carefully in La Mesa when conversations shifted to Neill's old studio in Georgia. The three began discussing heading down South to complete the bulk of the album in a historic old studio. Sun Studio and Phillips Recording in Memphis, as well as Robin Hood Studios in Tyler, Texas, were contenders, and the band even considered an old VFW hall in Neill's home town of Valdosta. The band desired, most of all, to get out of town and have the tracks imbued with a Southern kind of atmosphere. Logistical problems immediately surfaced with both Sun and Phillips, and Auerbach suggested Muscle Shoals Sound Studio.

Muscle Shoals, located in northwestern Alabama, opened in April 1969 and hosted several legendary acts, most famously The Rolling Stones and Paul Simon, before it moved from its original location on Jackson Highway in 1978 to a larger, more modern facility. The studio was closed in 2005 and had not seen recording in nearly 30 years, most recently having operated as a poorly maintained museum. The studio was on a short list of legendary venues where Auerbach had always wanted to record. Neill contacted Noel Webster, the musician and entrepreneur responsible for refurbishing the old studio, who cut the band a "good day rate, albeit with the clear understanding that we were getting nothing but an empty building with a bathroom, and yes, air conditioning. So we knew right from the start that we really would be trucking in our own equipment."

== Recording and production ==
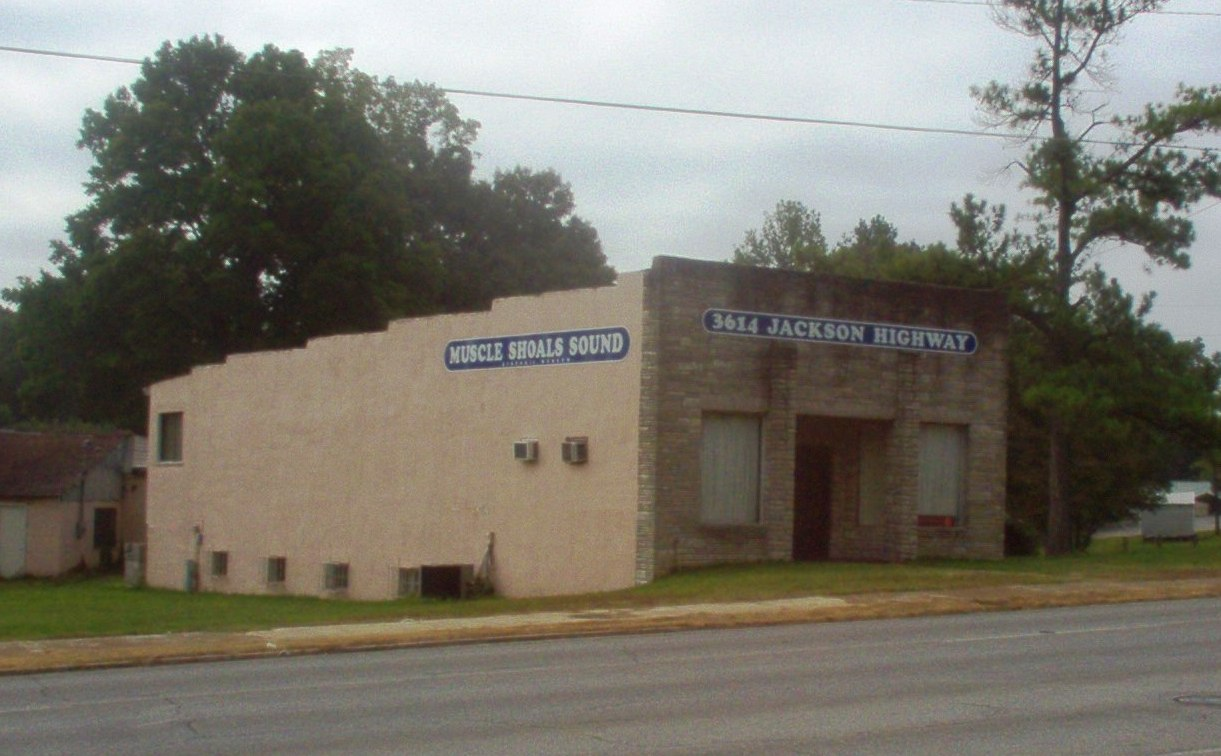
Brothers was the first album recorded in 30 years at Alabama's famous Muscle Shoals Sound Studio.

Neill, Auerbach, and Carney arrived at Muscle Shoals Sound on August 16, 2009—coincidentally 40 years to the day singer-songwriter R. B. Greaves cut "Take a Letter Maria" at the studio, the first hit record to originate from the building. The group hauled a truckload of Auerbach's equipment from Easy Eye Sound System in Akron, as well as Neill's personal gear from California. Neill's equipment included portions of a Universal Audio 610 console (the same desk featured during the early days of Muscle Shoals) and a late 1950s Pultec panning mixer, as well as a 10:2 Studer monitoring mixer originally designed for classical music recording. The studio was very much a museum when they arrived—they found vintage recording gear that no longer operated, along with photos on the walls of legendary performers, such as Lynyrd Skynyrd, who had once recorded there. Auerbach immediately took down the photos, feeling they were distracting decorations. The band put a piece of Plexiglas on top of the studio's non-functional console to hold their own digital recording equipment. The group experienced technical difficulties while recording. However, they were not caused by the studio, but rather by utility work on nearby telephone poles. Some of Neill's equipment was wrecked, including burned-out microphones. Compositions were kept very simple due to technical limitations. Neill said, "Thanks to the Studer mixer, we seldom went beyond 10 tracks." He occasionally had to resort to digital sources; as the studio's downstairs echo chambers were long gone, Neill attached a mono digital reverberator to the Studer console. He also provided additional guitar and percussion parts during the sessions.

Entering the sessions, Carney had a negative mindset due to his divorce. He said, "At the time it was really, really difficult for me because I had just split with my wife after a nine-year relationship and the last place I wanted to be was the middle of fucking nowhere in Alabama, sitting in a dark room." The first song recorded at Muscle Shoals, "Next Girl", helped shape the direction of the sessions. Auerbach's lyrics for the song about moving on resonated with the "bummed-out [and] spacey" Carney, and Auerbach noticed an improvement in his bandmate's mentality immediately after he heard them. Auerbach said, "When he heard the lyrics, he was just so stoked. The rest of the session it was smooth sailing." "Next Girl" was first cut with Carney playing drums and Auerbach playing bass, without guide vocals or the band's more usual guitar. The group continued to use a rhythm-first approach throughout the sessions, recording a basic arrangement of drums and bass before overdubbing guitar, keyboards, vocals, and percussion later. This imbued several songs, such as "Everlasting Light", "Howlin' for You", and "Sinister Kid", with a bass-driven sound. Neill found the emphasis on bass was also a result of the studio's acoustics:

It’'s because of the construction of that building. It's very odd: the acoustics are really different, the control room has this real mid‑range 'bark', and as a result you tend to mix things a certain way. So much so that when you go out to the car or listen through your ear buds back at the hotel, you suddenly realise, 'Jeez, I've done this completely differently.' You realise that it's because of that room that those early MSS productions were mixed the way they were, with the kick drum and bass really loud and present. And there I was, all those years later, doing the exact same thing—just flooring the kick and bass in order to hear it properly! But you can get away with it, because the floors in the main room have a lot of give, they're flexible kind of like a trampoline, and so they were acting like a bass trap, soaking up a lot of the low end. Add to that the bass deficiency inside the control room, and you were forced to add back the lows that were missing in the first place. It was like magic.

The group found their time at Muscle Shoals to be productive and inspirational, as they recorded all day in "a kind of focused frenzy" with a sense of immediacy. Neill recalled, "Things were happening that were very, very transcendent, as soon as they began playing. First few takes, we literally couldn't believe what we were hearing. Dan and Pat were kind of looking at each other saying, 'That doesn't even sound like us.' Seriously." Much of the songs crafted were based on "idea fragments" that had been cut beforehand as demos at both Neill's and Auerbach's studios, but eventually evolved into entirely different creations as the sessions progressed. The band recorded 10 of the 15 tracks on Brothers in their 10 days at the studio.

Due to the long hours working in the studio, Neill, Auerbach, and Carney generally only had time to kill at night when fewer retailers are open. Furthermore, Sheffield was remote and isolated; Neill said, "What they were complaining about is that at night, after we were done, they wanted to go swarm around and do something. There's nothing. I told them that before we went out. Unless you want to go see a movie or something, or go to Walmart and stand around under the fluorescent lights. So what did we do? We went to Walmart." Carney said that the trio were "just so bored that we were getting so fucked up every night at the hotel," and one drunken night the group stayed up watching YouTube clips of Freddie King. The following day, the musicians showed up at the studio and found a harpsichord. The band's manager had received a drunken voicemail from the band the night before asking for a harpsichord. The trio soon grew restless for a change, and after finalizing the tenth and final song at Muscle Shoals, the band left town. Back in La Mesa, Neill tweaked the multitracks, then filed the recordings away and awaited further instruction. The Black Keys eventually decided to re-work the overtly swampy tracks from Muscle Shoals using more modern machinery, and they subsequently employed producer Tchad Blake to re-mix their songs.

== Packaging ==
The album's art direction was designed by Michael Carney, the brother of drummer Patrick Carney. Michael wanted a change from their illustration-driven covers, and devised a simple approach, littered with messages that identify everything, such as the front saying, "This is an album by The Black Keys. The name of this album is Brothers." Nonesuch was initially perplexed, but once the label's marketing department approved it, Carney went with it. Michael said taking risks with an unconventional packaging added an incentive to purchasing physical copies, while acknowledging the minimalistic cover also helped with digital copies given "it does jump out on the iTunes page". In 2011, Michael won the Grammy Award for Best Album Package. The packaging is designed to resemble a vinyl record jacket, with the old Nonesuch logo on the front cover in the lower left, and the words "STEREO SOUND" in the upper right. The album was released as a 12-inch double LP. The Brothers art was compared to the front cover design of Howlin' Wolf's 1969 album, The Howlin' Wolf Album, which reads, "This is Howlin' Wolf's new album..." Auerbach and Carney have both stated repeatedly that Howlin' Wolf was one of their greatest influences.

When first opened, the label on the disc is almost entirely black. However, the label is heat-sensitive and turns white when played in a disc player for a long enough time. The label can also be revealed by touching the disc. On finding the heat-sensitive ink Carney told the Los Angeles Times, "Before we started the design, I talked to the people [at the label] and said I'd heard of this ink. Literally, every ink supplier was contacted. People are really open to making new packaging." On Australian copies of the album, the disc is white with black text; on the European copies the disc is silver with black text.

Included in the album sleeve is a poster with the lyrics on the back. The font used, Cooper Black, is used on the iconic Muscle Shoals Sound Studio (where the album was recorded) '3614 Jackson Highway' board and has been used by other bands, including The Doors on L.A. Woman, In It for the Money by Supergrass, the first three of The Fratellis albums, Tyler, The Creator's Goblin and the cover of Pet Sounds by The Beach Boys.

== Promotion ==
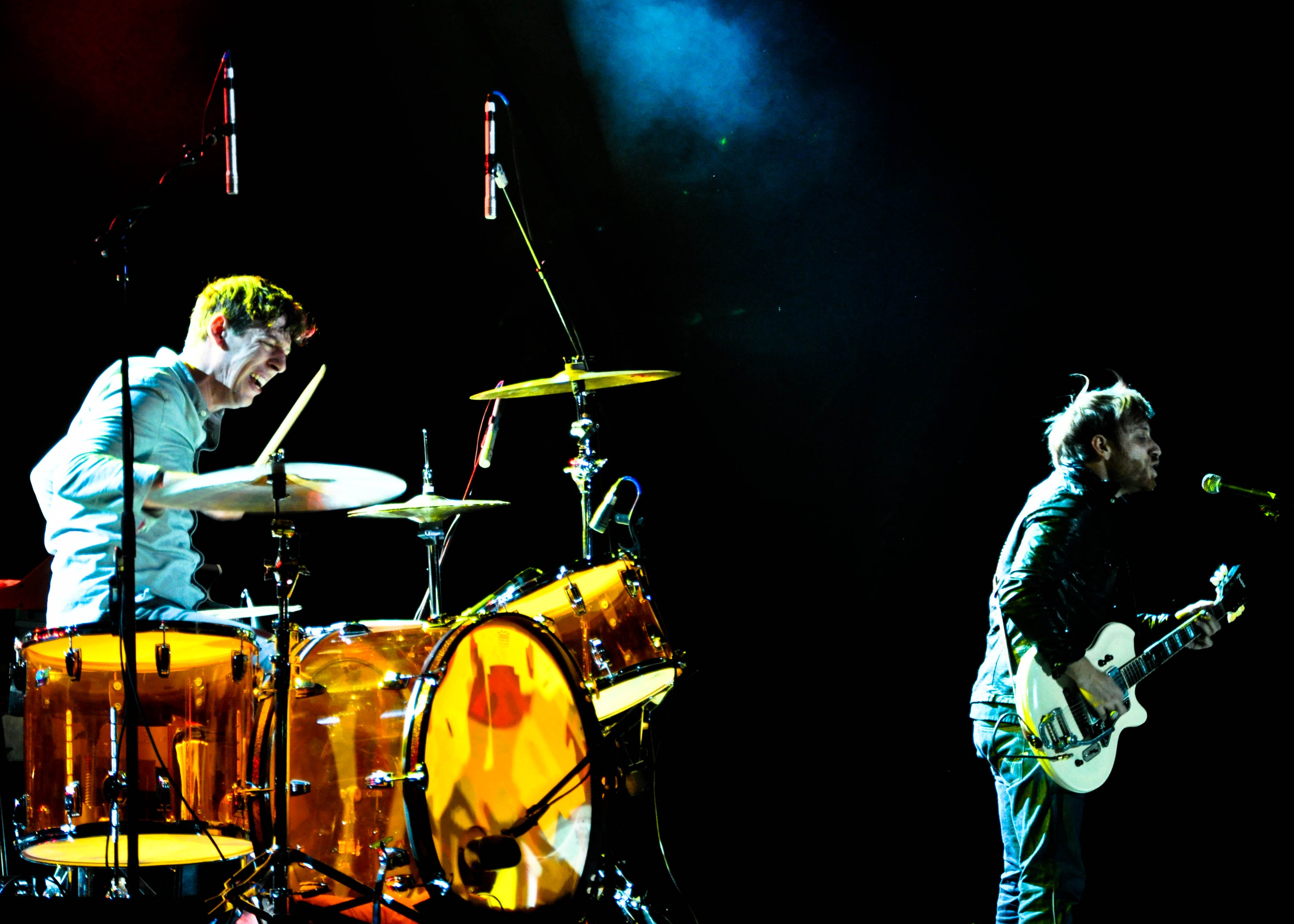
The Black Keys performing in February 2010, three months before the album's release

The album's first single was "Tighten Up", which became The Black Keys' most successful single to that point, being the group's first song to chart on and reach number one on the Alternative Songs and Rock Songs charts. Mark C. Horn of Buzzbin Magazine described the song: "The song intros with the distinct whistling from Ennio Morricone's The Good, The Bad and The Ugly composition, backed up by Carney's monster thump drumming and Auerbach's soulful vocal offerings." Famed producer Danger Mouse, who produced Attack and Release, produced the song, which was recorded at Brooklyn's Bunker Studios."

As the label asked director Chris Marrs Piliero to do a placeholder video for "Tighten Up" as a teaser for the album, he made a low-budget video for the song, released in April 2010, with The Black Keys alongside a dinosaur puppet named Frank. Later that month, another Piliero teaser video was released, with Frank singing "Next Girl" alongside bikini-clad models. The official "Tighten Up" video, directed by Piliero, was released on May 18, 2010.

An official video for the song "Howlin' for You" was released on February 10, 2011. Directed by Chris Marrs Piliero, the video parodied action movie trailers and starred Tricia Helfer, Diora Baird, Sean Patrick Flanery, Christian Serratos, Corbin Bernsen, Todd Bridges, and Shaun White. It was nominated for the 2011 MTV Video Music Award for Best Rock Video.

The band appeared as the musical guest on the American sketch comedy television show Saturday Night Live on January 8, 2011, performing "Howlin for You" and "Tighten Up".

The third-season finale of Luther used the song "Never Gonna Give You Up" as an outro song.

== Reception ==
Professional ratings
Aggregate scores
Source	Rating
AnyDecentMusic?	7.6/10
Metacritic	82/100
Review scores
Source	Rating
AllMusic	4.5/5 stars
The A.V. Club	B+
Entertainment Weekly	B+
The Guardian	3/5 stars
The Independent	4/5 stars
NME	8/10
Pitchfork	7.7/10
Q	4/5 stars
Rolling Stone	4/5 stars
Uncut	4/5 stars

Brothers garnered critical acclaim. According to review aggregator website Metacritic, the album has an average critic review score of 82/100. Rolling Stone magazine placed the album at No. 2 on the Best Albums of 2010 and "Everlasting Light" at No. 11 on the Best Songs of 2010. The album was also featured on Spin's Top 40 Albums of 2010 and Paste magazine's 50 Best Albums of 2010. Time magazine ranked it number seven on its list of 2010's Top 10 Albums. The album was also included in the book 1001 Albums You Must Hear Before You Die.

The album was nominated for five awards at the 53rd Annual Grammy Awards, the biggest win being Best Alternative Music Album, beating out eventual Album of the Year winner, Arcade Fire's The Suburbs. The single "Tighten Up" won the award for Best Rock Performance by a Duo or Group with Vocals and was nominated for Best Rock Song. "Black Mud" was nominated for Best Rock Instrumental Performance. The fifth nomination was for Grammy Award for Best Recording Package, which Michael Carney won for designing the album artwork.

Brothers was also the band's commercial breakthrough, as it sold over 73,000 copies in the United States in its first week and peaked at number three on the Billboard 200, their best performance on the chart to that point. By the time follow-up El Camino was about to be released in 2011, Brothers had sold 847,000 copies in the U.S. The album was later certified platinum in the United States and double platinum in Canada.

== Track listing ==
All tracks are written by Dan Auerbach and Patrick Carney, except where noted.

No.	Title	Length
1.	"Everlasting Light"	3:24
2.	"Next Girl"	3:18
3.	"Tighten Up"	3:31
4.	"Howlin' for You"	3:12
5.	"She's Long Gone"	3:06
6.	"Black Mud"	2:10
7.	"The Only One"	5:00
8.	"Too Afraid to Love You"	3:25
9.	"Ten Cent Pistol"	4:29
10.	"Sinister Kid"	3:45
11.	"The Go Getter"	3:37
12.	"I'm Not the One"	3:49
13.	"Unknown Brother"	4:00
14.	"Never Give You Up" (Kenneth Gamble, Leon Huff, and Jerry Butler)	3:39
15.	"These Days"	5:12

Bonus tracks

No.	Title	Length
16.	"Ohio" (7-inch vinyl or free download for members of the band's website)	4:29
17.	"Howlin' for You (feat. Prins Thomas Diskomiks)" (Available on iTunes)	7:27

Deluxe Remastered 10th Anniversary Edition

No.	Title	Length
16.	"Chop and Change"	2:25
17.	"Keep My Name Outta Your Mouth"	3:09
18.	"Black Mud Part II"	2:39

== Personnel ==
The Black Keys

- Dan Auerbach – vocals, guitars, bass guitar, keyboards
- Patrick Carney – drums, percussion

Production

- Tchad Blake – mixing
- Brian Lucey – mastering
- Mark Neill – production, engineering

== In popular culture ==
- The third single of the album, "Next Girl", was featured on the game Saints Row: The Third.
- The single "Everlasting Light", was featured on the soundtrack of the game NBA 2K15.
- The single "Sinister Kid", was featured on the game Fight Night Champion.

== Charts ==
=== Weekly charts ===
Chart (2010)	Peak position
Australian Albums Chart	8
Belgian Albums (Ultratop Wallonia)	20
Belgian Albums (Ultratop Wallonia)	58
Canadian Albums Chart	4
Danish Albums (Hitlisten)	3
Dutch Album Top 100	39
French Albums Chart (SNEP)	44
German Albums (Offizielle Top 100)	95
Norwegian Albums Chart	24
New Zealand Top 40 Albums	10
Spanish Albums (Promusicae)	48
Scottish Albums	32
Swedish Albums (Sverigetopplistan)	45
Swiss Albums Top 100	48
UK Albums Chart	29
US Billboard 200	3

Chart (2021)	Peak position
Croatian International Albums (HDU)	1
Hungarian Albums (MAHASZ)	14
Portuguese Albums (AFP)	50

=== Year-end charts ===
Chart (2010)	Position
US Billboard 200	79
US Alternative Albums Chart	11
US Digital Albums Chart	19
US Rock Albums Chart	16
Chart (2011)	Position
US Billboard 200	50
US Alternative Albums Chart	5
US Rock Albums Chart	7
Chart (2012)	Position
US Billboard 200	97

=== Decade-end charts ===
Chart (2010–2019)	Position
US Billboard 200	196

== Certifications ==
Region	Certification	Certified units/sales
Canada (Music Canada)	4× Platinum	320,000^{‡}
New Zealand (RMNZ)	Platinum	15,000^{‡}
United Kingdom (BPI)	Gold	100,000^{^}
United States (RIAA)	2× Platinum	2,000,000^{‡}
^{^} Shipments figures based on certification alone.^{‡} Sales+streaming figures based on certification alone.
