= The Velveteers =

American rock band

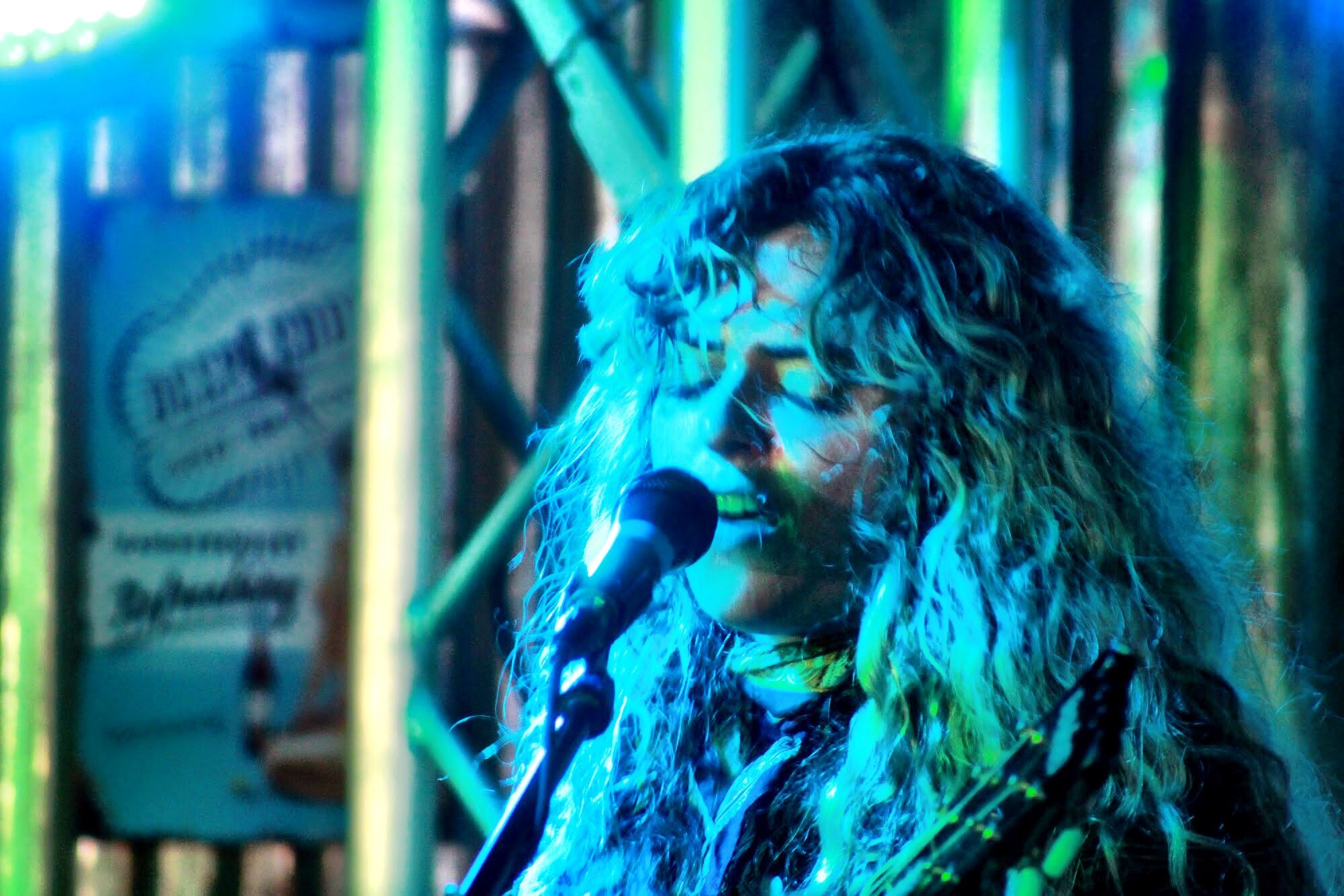
- Demi Demitro from The Velveteers performing at Westword Music Showcase 2017

Background information
- Origin: Boulder, Colorado, United States
- Genres: Garage rock; alternative rock
- Years active: 2014–present
- Label: Easy Eye Sound
- Members: Demi Demitro; Baby Pottersmith
- Website: thevelveteers.com

The Velveteers are an American rock band from Boulder, Colorado. They have opened for Guns N' Roses, Smashing Pumpkins, Greta Van Fleet, and have toured with the Black Keys. The band is notable for its unconventional configuration, featuring two drummers who perform simultaneously, as well as for its association with producer Dan Auerbach of the Black Keys.

== History ==
The Velveteers were formed as a duo in 2014 in Boulder, Colorado, when lead vocalist and guitarist Demi Demitro met Baby Pottersmith at a local concert. They were 15 and 16 years old at the time, respectively. They play with many touring drummers. Previous touring members including John Demitro, Thomas Rhodes and Jonny Fig.

Before releasing their debut studio album Nightmare Daydream in 2021, the band issued several independent recordings, including four singles—“Death Hex,” “This Love Lasted,” “Lean Woman Blues” (a T. Rex cover) and “Tale of the Bad Seed”—and one self-titled EP, The Velveteers.

Nightmare Daydream was recorded in Nashville, Tennessee, and produced by Dan Auerbach of the Black Keys. The recording process focused on live sound, with minimal overdubs. It was released on October 8, 2021, through Easy Eye Sound. The lead single, "Charmer And The Snake", helped establish the band's presence in the national rock scene.

On February 14, 2025, the Velveteers released their sophomore album, A Million Knives, which was recorded in Nashville, again with Auerbach as producer.

== Musical style and influences ==
The Velveteers' music is rooted in garage rock and alternative rock, drawing on punk and glam rock influences while emphasizing raw, live performance energy. Their sound is characterized by heavy fuzzed guitar tones, driving rhythms, and an unconventional dual-drummer configuration that replaces the traditional bass role.

The band has cited a preference for capturing performances live in the studio, minimizing overdubs in order to preserve spontaneity and intensity, an approach that has been central to their recordings with producer Dan Auerbach.

== Discography ==
=== Singles ===
- "Death Hex" (2016)
- "This Love Lasted" (2017)
- "Tale of the Bad Seed" (2019)
- "Lean Woman Blues" (2019)

=== EPs ===
- The Velveteers (2018)

=== Albums ===
- Nightmare Daydream (2021)
- A Million Knives (2025)
