= Early James =

American singer-songwriter

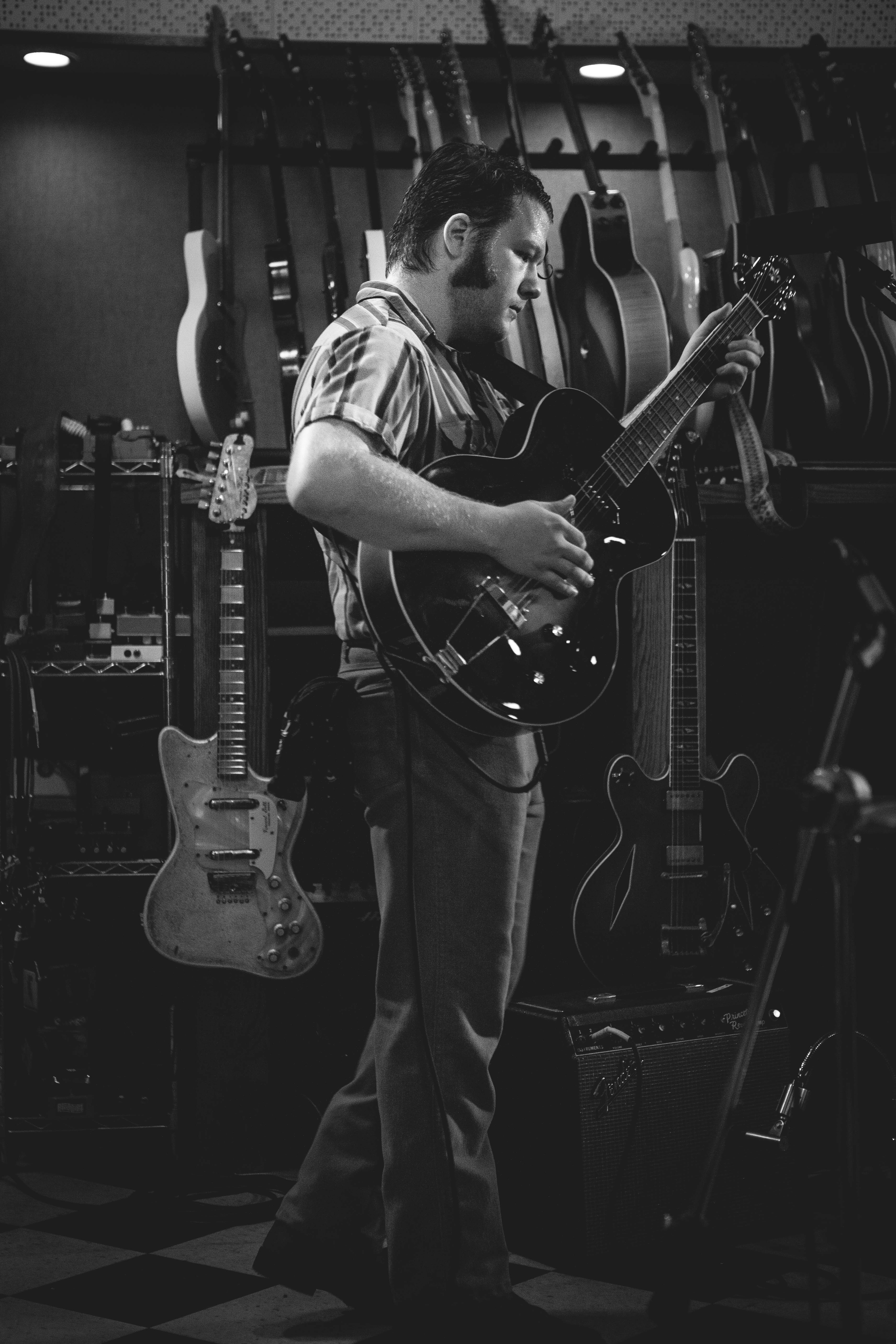

Background information
- Also known as: Early James
- Born: Fredrick James Mullis Jr. June 2, 1993 (age 33); Troy, Alabama, US
- Origin: Birmingham, Alabama
- Genres: Americana; alternative country; alternative rock; blues; folk; folk rock
- Occupations: Singer-songwriter; musician
- Instruments: Vocals; guitar
- Labels: Nonesuch Records, Easy Eye Sound
- Website: earlyjames.com

Fredrick James Mullis Jr. (born June 2, 1993), known professionally as Early James, is an American singer-songwriter. He is signed onto studio-label Easy Eye Sound, the studio-label of Black Keys' guitarist Dan Auerbach.

== Early life ==
James was born and raised in Troy, Alabama. At the age of 16, he received his first guitar from his aunt for Christmas. He began writing songs shortly thereafter, citing James Taylor and Johnny Cash as formative influences on his music.

== Career ==
James grew up in Troy, Alabama, where he was raised by the women in his family. He realized he could seek a career as a musician at age six when he watched a local musician play covers at a family function, and began playing the guitar at age sixteen when he was gifted one for Christmas. His friend was the frontman for the local band Fire Mountain and told him that he could begin opening for them if he started performing original songs. At that point, he began writing his own music.

At the age of 21, James moved to Birmingham, Alabama to pursue music professionally. It was here that he met Adrian Marmolejo and formed their band, Early James and the Latest. Drawing inspiration from Birmingham's diverse music scene, James began to cultivate a sound containing elements of blues, folk, rock, and classic country.

Early James released some early songs on his YouTube channel and performed them from 2016 to 2019 such as "Tinfoil Hat" and "Gravy Train".

Dan Auerbach of The Black Keys discovered James while the songwriter was working in Birmingham. Auerbach liked James' unique style and asked to produce his debut album.

On December 5, 2019, James announced his debut album Singing for My Supper would be released on March 13, 2020, by Nonesuch and Auerbauch's Easy Eye Sound. He also released his first single from this project, "Blue Pill Blues." Subsequent singles from this project, "It Doesn't Matter Now" and "High Horse" were released on January 23, 2020, and February 13, 2020, respectively. Early James described Singing for My Supper as being about "disillusion in styles that glance back to the 1970s and before."

In 2020, James planned to be on tour supporting Shovels and Rope, The Lone Bellow, The Marcus King Band, and The Black Keys. Many of the shows were cancelled due to the pandemic, but James performed in several virtual shows, including with The Marcus King Band. In a performance covered by Rolling Stone for its changes to the Band's The Last Waltz, James rewrote lyrics to "The Night They Drove Old Dixie Down" to reframe it as a critique, rather than what some saw as a celebration, of the Confederacy.

James supported the Lone Bellow on their "Half Moonlight Tour" in 2021. He performed solo at the Newport Folk Festival in July 2021.

On August 19, 2022, James released his second studio album Strange Time To Be Alive. One song, "Real Lowdown Lonesome", featured Sierra Ferrell. Songs such as "Wasted and Wanting" and "Dance in The Fire" had already been played live, as early as 2018. In late 2022, Early James started his first headlining tour, beginning in Texas, which he showed his enthusiasm for by writing a song about the tour.

== The Latest ==
According to Mullis, "The Latest" refers to who commonly plays with him. Since 2016, that has been Adrian Marmolejo, who plays stand-up bass or electric bass. Beginning in 2019, Joey Rudeisell and Ford Boswell played with Mullis as drummer and steel guitarist respectively.

== Artistry ==
James was inspired in his tweens by Hank Williams Sr. and later by grunge and alternative rock bands like Pearl Jam, Soundgarden and Nirvana. His years writing and performing in Birmingham, Alabama expanded the genres he wrote in to include bluegrass, folk and alt-country.

James has been compared to Tom Waits and has referred to the musician as one of his inspirations, along with Fiona Apple. His lyrics are often dark but with a sardonic sense of humor, dealing with such themes as depression, addiction, and relationships. According to The New York Times, James' "melodies hesitate and evade the beat; his lyrics move via moody free association, not the direct narratives of most Americana."

James' voice is distinct, described by the New York Times as "tattered and nervous, with a grainy quaver." Round Hill Music states that his voice comprises "a century’s worth of American barkers and crooners, from Alan Lomax field recordings to mid-century iconoclasts like Billie Holliday and Howlin Wolf to ghostly late-century interpreters like Fiona Apple and Tom Waits."

== Discography ==
=== Albums ===
Title	Details	Songs
Singing for My Supper	Released: March 13, 2020; Label: Easy Eye Sound; Collaborators: "Way of the Dinosaur" and "Easter Eggs" co-written with Dan Auberbach and Patrick James McLaughlin; "Clockwork Town" co-written with Dan Auerbach and John Bettis; "High Horse" co-written with Dan Auerbach and Bobby Wood; "Gone as a Ghost" co-written with Dan Auerbach and Ronnie Bowman	1. "Blue Pill Blues" (3:07); 2. "Stockholm Syndrome" (3:14); 3. "Way of the Dinosaur" (3:48); 4. "Clockwork Town" (3:20); 5. "Easter Eggs" (4:01); 6. "It Doesn't Matter Now" (3:27); 7. "High Horse" (3:25); 8. "All Down Hill" (3:00); 9. "Gone as a Ghost" (3:56); 10. "Dishes in the Dark" (3:43)
Strange Time To Be Alive	Released: August 19, 2022; Label: Easy Eye Sound; Collaborators: "Real Low Down Lonesome" featuring Sierra Ferrell	1. "Racing to a Red Light" (4:24); 2. "Straightjacket For Two" (3:50); 3. "My Sweet Camelia" (3:35); 4. "Pigsty" (4:10); 5. "What Strange Time To Be Alive" (3:06); 6. "Real Low Down Lonesome" (4:29); 7. "Harder To Blame" (4:06); 8. "If Heaven Is A Hotel" (3:08); 9. "Splenda Daddy" (3:04); 10. "Dance in the Fire" (3:51); 11. "Wasted and Wanting" (3:21); 12. "Something For Nothing" (3:12)
Medium Raw	Released: January 10, 2025; Label: Easy Eye Sound; Collaborators: “I Got This Problem” co-written with Pat McLaughlin and Dan Auerbach; “Nothing Surprises Me Anymore” co-written with Jeff Trott; "Go Down Swinging” co-written with Langhorne Slim; "Upside Down Umbrella” co-written with Mick Flannery; "Unspeakable Thing" co-written with Ryan Sobb	1. "Steely Knives" (3:01); 2. "Nothing Surprises Me Anymore" (3:06); 3. "Tinfoil Hat" (5:27); 4. "Go Down Swinging" (2:59); 5. "Rag Doll" (3:55); 6. "Gravy Train" (3:23); 7. "I Could Just Die Right Now" (4:15); 8. "Unspeakable Thing" (3:09); 9. "Beauty Queen" (5:08); 10. "Dig To China" (6:54); 11. "Upside Down Umbrella" (2:54); 12. " I Got This Problem" (2:32)

=== Extended plays ===
Title	Details	Songs
Early James and the Latest	Released: November 1, 2018; Label: Self-released	1. "Dig to China" (3:51); 2. "Blow for Blow" (2:54); 3. "Taste of Sin" (4:26); 4. "Damn Tornado" (3:13)

=== Singles ===
Title	Details	Songs
"It Doesn't Matter Now"	Released: March 13, 2021; Label: Easy Eye Sound	1. "It Doesn't Matter Now" (3:27)
"Tumbleweed" b/w "Mama Can Be My Valentine"	Released: August 6, 2021; Label: Easy Eye Sound	1. "Tumbleweed" (2:08); 2. "Mama Can Be My Valentine" (2:28)
