= Keep It Hid =

Studio album by Dan Auerbach
- Released: February 10, 2009
- Genres: Blues rock; garage rock; indie folk; neo-psychedelia
- Length: 50:43
- Label: Nonesuch
- Producer: Dan Auerbach

Dan Auerbach chronology
Keep It Hid (2009)	Waiting on a Song (2017)

Professional ratings
Aggregate scores
Source	Rating
Metacritic	(80/100
Review scores
Source	Rating
The A.V. Club	B+
AllMusic	4/5 stars
Austinist	A−
In Review Online	3/4 stars
Now Magazine	5/5 stars
Paste Magazine	8.5/10
Pitchfork	6.2/10
PopMatters	9/10 stars
Spin	3.5/5 stars

Keep It Hid is the debut solo album by the American blues-rock musician Dan Auerbach of the Black Keys, released on February 10, 2009, through Nonesuch Records. The second track, "I Want Some More", was featured in season 2, episode 2 of Peaky Blinders. "Heartbroken, in Disrepair" was featured in the 2011 video game Need for Speed: The Run and in "Bad Optics", an episode of the HBO Max series Lanterns. The final track, "Goin' Home", was included in the soundtrack of the 2009 film Up in the Air.

== Critical reception ==
Keep It Hid was met with "generally favorable" reviews from critics. At Metacritic, which assigns a weighted average rating out of 100 to reviews from mainstream publications, this release received an average score of 80, based on 23 reviews.

== Track listing ==
All songs written by Dan Auerbach, except where noted.

1. "Trouble Weighs a Ton" – 2:19
2. "I Want Some More" (Wayne Carson Thompson) – 3:49
3. "Heartbroken, in Disrepair" – 3:21
4. "Because I Should" (D. Auerbach, Mark Neill) – 0:53
5. "Whispered Words (Pretty Lies)" (Charles Auerbach) – 4:06
6. "Real Desire" – 4:26
7. "When the Night Comes" (D. Auerbach, C. Auerbach) – 4:11
8. "Mean Monsoon" – 3:47
9. "The Prowl" – 3:18
10. "Keep It Hid" – 3:41
11. "My Last Mistake" – 3:14
12. "When I Left the Room" – 4:02
13. "Street Walkin'" – 3:52
14. "Goin' Home" – 4:57

== Personnel ==
- Dan Auerbach – lead and backing vocals, lead and rhythm guitar, piano, organ, synthesizer, bass, drums, percussion, drum loops, sound effects, producer
- Bob Cesare – drums on tracks (2, 3, 5, 8–13), rhythm guitar on "Goin' Home
- Dave Huddleston – upright bass on "Whispered Words"
- Rob "Thorny" Thorsen – upright bass on "Mean Monsoon"
- James Quine – electric rhythm guitar on "Mean Monsoon" and "Street Walkin'",
  harmony vocals on "Trouble Weighs A Ton" and "Heartbroken, in Disrepair"
- Jessica Lea Mayfield – harmony vocals on "When the Night Comes"
- Mark Neill – maracas on "Heartbroken, in Disrepair"
- James Quine – photography
- Amy Burrows – album cover design
- Bob Cesare – assistant engineer
- Mark Neill – mixer
- Jim Demain – mastering

Tracks 4 and 7 recorded and engineered by Mark Neill for Soil of the South Productions

== Charts ==
Chart (2009)	Peak position
Australian Albums (ARIA)	91
