= Nat Myers =

American blues musician (born 1990)

- Born: November 28, 1990 (age 35)
- Genres: Blues
- Occupation: Musician

Nat Myers (born 28 November, 1990) in Kansas, United States is an American blues musician from Kentucky.

In February 2025, Myers announced that he had been diagnosed with sarcoma which had surrounded his heart and pulmonary artery.

== Discography ==
=== Albums ===
- Yellow Peril (Easy Eye Sound, 2023)
- Hobo Wine & Remedy Blues (2021)
- Field Recordings (2020)

=== Singles ===
- God Don't Like It (2026)
- Young Mind Old Soul (2026)
- New Chauffeur Blues (2025)
