= Waiting on a Song =

Studio album by Dan Auerbach
- Released: June 2, 2017
- Recorded: 2016–2017
- Studios: Easy Eye Sound (Nashville, Tennessee)
- Genres: Pop; rock; soul; Americana
- Length: 32:38
- Label: Easy Eye Sound
- Producer: Dan Auerbach

Dan Auerbach chronology
Keep It Hid (2009)	Waiting on a Song (2017)

Waiting on a Song is the second studio album by American musician Dan Auerbach. The album was released on June 2, 2017, and is the first release from Easy Eye Sound, Auerbach's label.

== Critical reception ==
Professional ratings
Aggregate scores
Source	Rating
Metacritic	75/100
Review scores
Source	Rating
The A.V. Club	B−
Consequence of Sound	C+
Exclaim!	8/10
The Independent	3/5 stars
The Observer	4/5 stars
Pitchfork	6.7/10
Paste	8.6/10
PopMatters	7/10 stars
Rolling Stone	3.5/5 stars
Slant Magazine	4/5 stars

Waiting on a Song received generally positive reviews from critics. At Metacritic, which assigns a normalized rating out of 100 to reviews from mainstream publications, the album received an average score of 75, based on 19 reviews.

== Single ==
The title track of the album was released as a single in the UK in June 2017 with a video directed by Bryan Schlam and featuring John Prine and Pat McLaughlin in cameo roles.

== Track listing ==
No.	Title	Length
1.	"Waiting on a Song"	2:49
2.	"Malibu Man"	3:36
3.	"Livin' in Sin"	2:24
4.	"Shine on Me"	3:17
5.	"King of a One Horse Town"	3:47
6.	"Never in My Wildest Dreams"	2:56
7.	"Cherrybomb"	3:45
8.	"Stand by My Girl"	3:53
9.	"Undertow"	3:24
10.	"Show Me"	2:50

== Charts ==
Chart (2017)	Peak position
Australian Albums (ARIA)	83
Austrian Albums (Ö3 Austria)	63
Belgian Albums (Ultratop Flanders)	11
Belgian Albums (Ultratop Wallonia)	58
Canadian Albums (Billboard)	65
Dutch Albums (Album Top 100)	43
French Albums (SNEP)	185
German Albums (Offizielle Top 100)	62
Irish Albums (IRMA)	51
Italian Albums (FIMI)	45
Scottish Albums (Official Charts)	27
Spanish Albums (PROMUSICAE)	57
Swiss Albums (Schweizer Hitparade)	22
UK Albums (Official Charts)	49
US Billboard 200	41
