= Patrick Carney =

American drummer (born 1980)

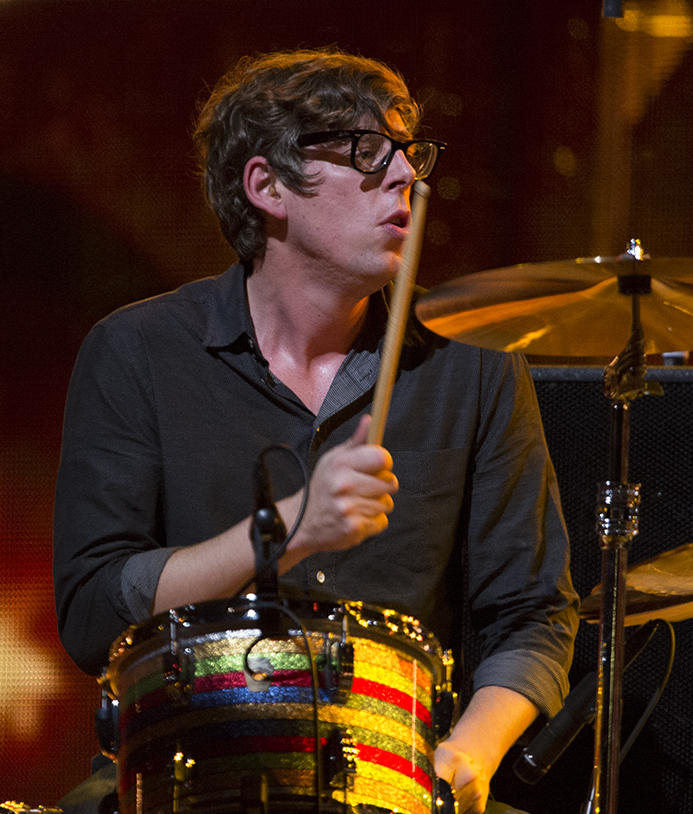
- Carney performing in 2014

Background information
- Also known as: The Salesman, Chilli con Carney, Tickles, Captain Crunch.
- Born: Patrick James Carney; April 15, 1980 (age 46); Akron, Ohio, U.S.
- Genres: Blues rock; garage rock; alternative rock; indie rock
- Occupations: Musician; songwriter; record producer
- Instruments: Drums; percussion; guitar; bass; piano; keyboards
- Years active: 2000–present
- Member of: The Black Keys
- Formerly of: Drummer; The Rentals
- Spouses: Denise Grollmus (m. 2007; div. 2009); Emily Ward (m. 2012; div. 2016); Michelle Branch (m. 2019)

Patrick James Carney (born April 15, 1980) is an American musician and producer best known as the drummer of the Black Keys, a blues rock band from Akron, Ohio.

== Early life ==
Carney stated in an interview with Modern Drummer that he never took drum lessons as a child, but learned by mimicking friends who also were drummers, using a $150 drumset that he bought with money earned from a job as a teenager. Carney grew up in Akron, Ohio.

== Career ==
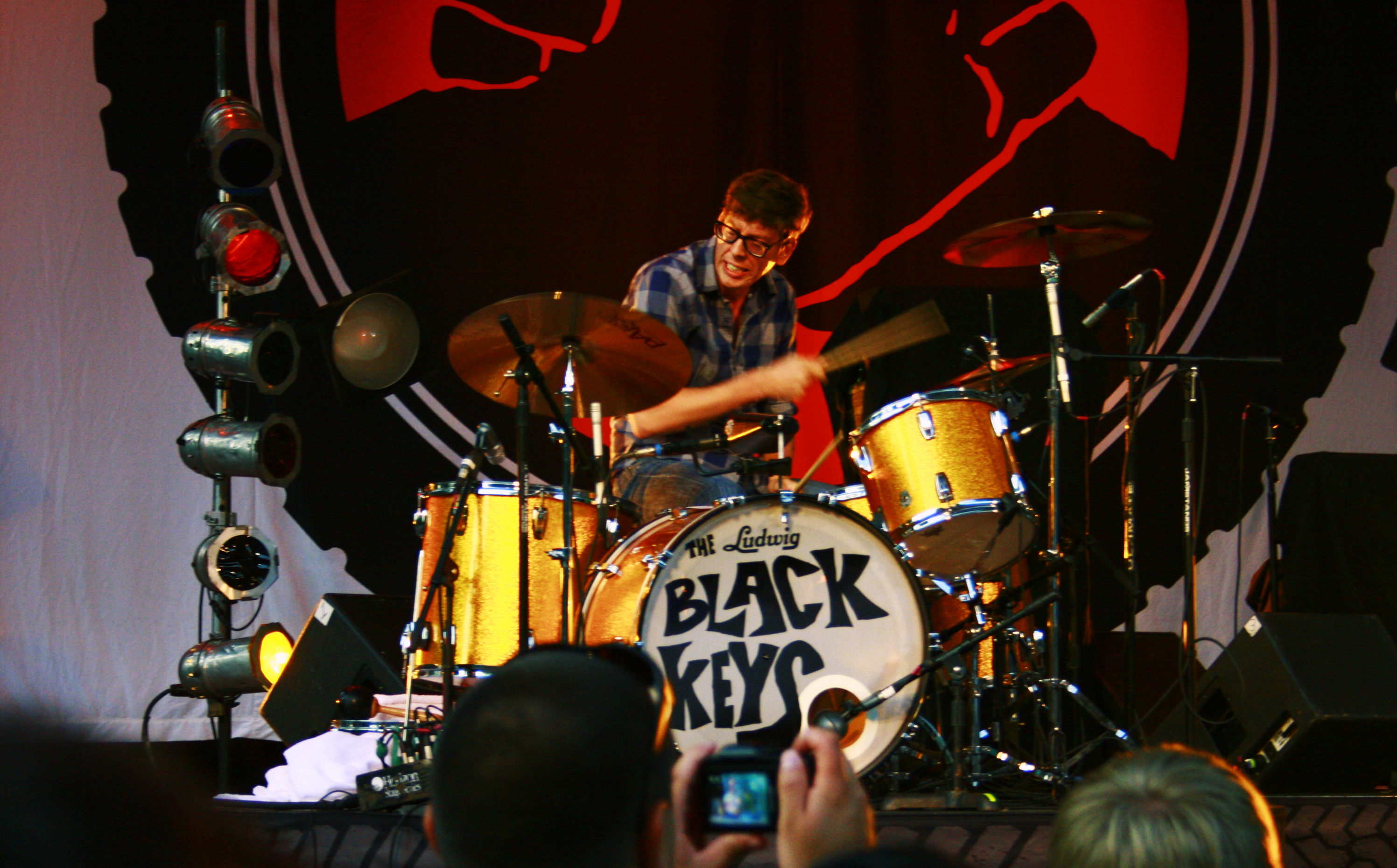
Carney playing with the Black Keys in 2010

In 2001, Carney and Auerbach, lead singer and guitarist, formed the Black Keys, releasing their debut album The Big Come Up less than a year later. This was followed by Thickfreakness in 2003 and Rubber Factory in 2004. The band's fourth album Magic Potion was released in 2006. Attack & Release, their critically acclaimed fifth album was released in 2008, with a follow-up in 2010 titled Brothers. The band released the albums El Camino in 2011, Turn Blue in 2014, Let's Rock in 2019, Delta Kream in 2021, and Dropout Boogie in 2022. The band's album Ohio Players was released on April 5, 2024. The band's album No Rain, No Flowers was released on August 8, 2025. The band's newest album Peaches! is scheduled for release on May 1, 2026

=== Music producer ===
Carney currently produces and writes music out of his Nashville, Tennessee-based recording studio, Audio Eagle. He has produced a range of artists from various musical backgrounds including the Black Keys, Michelle Branch, Calvin Johnson, Tennis, the Sheepdogs, Beaten Awake, Houseguest, Churchbuilder, Jessy Wilson, Kramies and *repeat repeat.

=== Audio Eagle Studio ===
Audio Eagle Studio is a recording studio opened in 2001 by Carney. The studio was located in Akron, Ohio and consisted mostly of a digital 12-track recorder. It went through many incarnations and configurations and was mainly used to record the first four Black Keys albums. In 2010, the studio was relocated to Nashville, Tennessee.

=== Serious Boredom on Sirius XMU ===
Carney hosts a monthly radio show on Sirius XMU called "Serious Boredom with Patrick Carney."

=== Vice News Tonight ===
Carney had a segment on HBO's news show, Vice News Tonight, titled "Patrick Carney's High Standards Music Corner" where he listened to and judged new songs.

=== Other musical ventures ===
In 2009, while fellow Black Keys member Dan Auerbach was on his solo tour, Carney formed a new band called Drummer in which he played bass guitar. Each of the band's members had played drums in another band. They released Feel Good Together, their debut album in the same year. Carney is the drummer on the Rentals' 2014 album Lost in Alphaville.

Carney contributed the main title theme to the 2014 Netflix show BoJack Horseman, and, in 2017, music to its soundtrack.

== Personal life ==
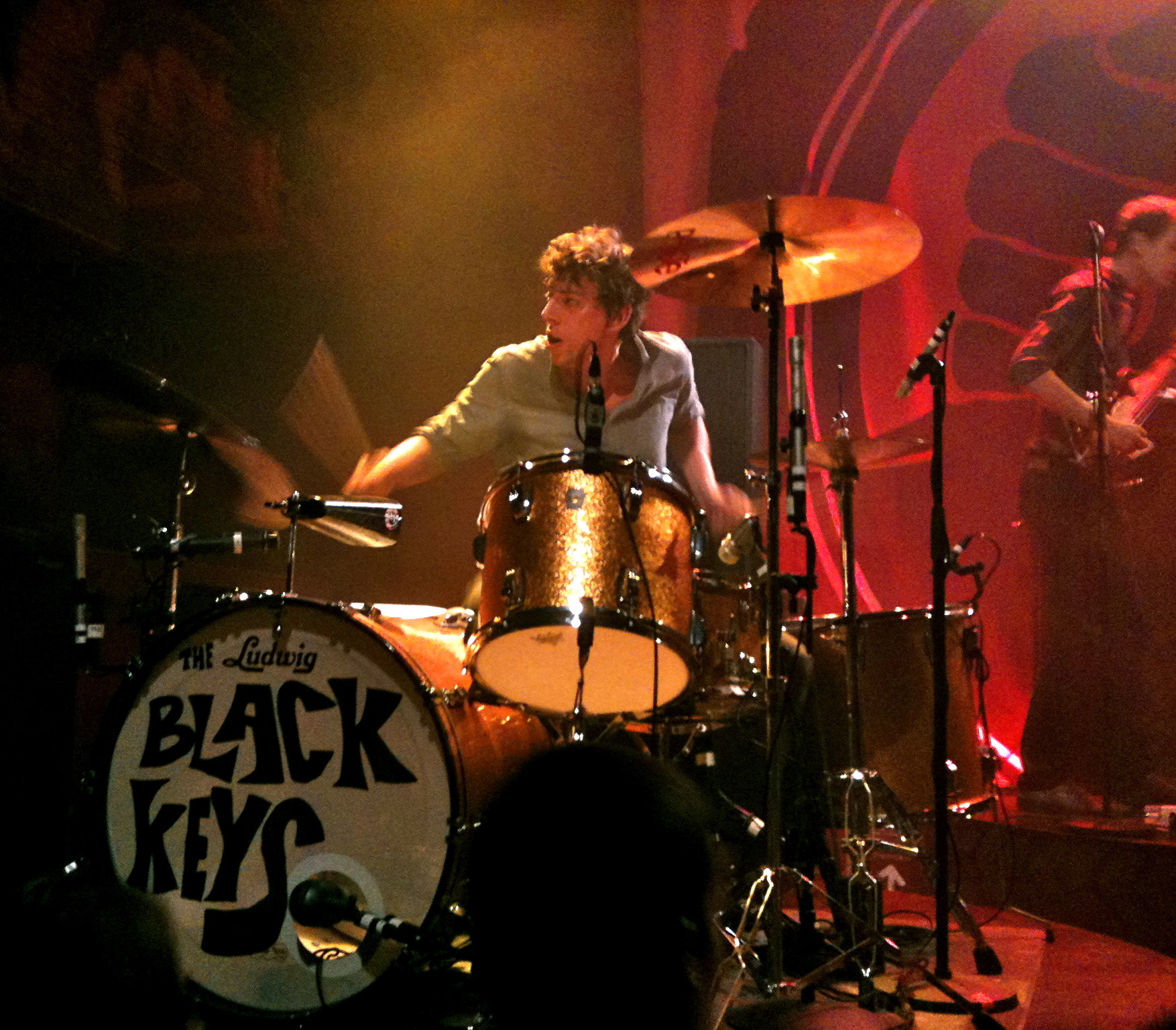
Patrick Carney, playing at the House of Blues in New Orleans, Louisiana, on September 21, 2010.

Carney's first marriage was to writer Denise Grollmus, in 2007, when he lived in Akron, Ohio. The two had dated for several years, since Grollmus was a student at Oberlin College in Ohio and Carney and Dan Auerbach launched the Black Keys. The couple divorced in 2009. Both talked about the messy breakup in the media; Carney in Rolling Stone's May 27, 2010, issue and Grollmus in an essay - "Snapshots From a Rock 'N' Roll Marriage", published in Salon on March 3, 2011.

In 2010, Carney and his bandmate, Dan Auerbach, moved from Akron and purchased homes in Nashville. They recorded their El Camino album at Auerbach's newly completed Nashville studio, Easy Eye Sound Studio.

Carney married Emily Ward, whom he had met while living in New York City, on September 15, 2012, in the backyard of their Nashville home. Carney and Ward divorced in January 2016. Ward, a California native, had moved to Los Angeles by that time.

In 2015, Carney met Michelle Branch at a Grammy party, and the two started dating during the production of Branch's album Hopeless Romantic, which Carney produced. In 2017, Branch and her daughter Owen moved into Carney's Nashville home, which they share with Irish wolfhounds. Carney and Branch became engaged on her birthday in 2017. On February 11, 2018, Branch announced that she and Carney were expecting their first child. Their son, Rhys James Carney, was born in August 2018. Carney and Branch married in April 2019.

In December 2020, it was revealed that Branch suffered a miscarriage. In February 2022, Branch gave birth to a daughter, her second with Carney, and her third in total. On August 11, 2022, Branch announced her separation from Carney, citing his alleged infidelity. She was arrested on a charge of domestic assault due to slapping Carney after accusing him of infidelity. This charge was later dismissed. The couple later reconciled.

== Discography ==
The Black Keys

- The Big Come Up (2002)
- Thickfreakness (2003)
- Rubber Factory (2004)
- Magic Potion (2006)
- Attack & Release (2008)
- Brothers (2010)
- El Camino (2011)
- Turn Blue (2014)
- Let's Rock (2019)
- Delta Kream (2021)
- Dropout Boogie (2022)
- Ohio Players (2024)

Drummer

- Feel Good Together (2009)

The Rentals

- Lost in Alphaville (2014)

=== Producer ===
- The Sheepdogs (2012)
- Young & Old (2012)
- Underneath the Rainbow (2014)
- Ritual in Repeat (2014)
- Goon (2015)
- Hopeless Romantic (2017)
- Double Roses (2017)
- A Wonderful Beast (2018)
- Phase (2019)
- Glazed (2019)
- Kramies “Days Of” (2021)
- The Trouble with Fever (2022)
