= Alive Naturalsound Records discography =

- Studio albums: 80+
- EPs: 10+
- Live albums: 10+
- Compilation albums: 5
- Singles: 5+

The following is a discography for Alive Naturalsound Records, an American independent music label founded in 1994. The label regularly releases albums both digitally, on vinyl, and on CD. The label is also known for releasing the debut albums by bands such as Lee Bains III and the Glory Fires, The Black Keys, Two Gallants, Radio Moscow, Black Diamond Heavies, Buffalo Killers, and Hollis Brown. The label has also released a number of reissues of musicians such as The Nerves, Swamp Dogg, Iggy Pop & James Williamson, and Nathaniel Mayer as well as several compilation albums.

== Discography ==
Releases for Alive Naturalsound Records
Yr	Cat. #	Release title	Artist(s)	Notes
2020	ALIVE210	Rough and Tumble	Dirty Streets	
2020	ALIVE209	Skin Suit	The Bobby Lees	
2020	ALIVE208	West Coast Highway Cosmic	Datura4	
2019	ALIVE207	Everyday Dreams	Jesper Lindell	
2019	ALIVE206	Let It Burn	GospelbeacH	
2019	ALIVE205	Shake and Bake	Left Lane Cruiser	
2019	ALIVE204	Blessed is the Boogie	Datura4	
2019	ALIVE203	Desert Dreams	Lonesome Shack	
2019	ALIVE202	Trash Glamour	Beechwood	
2018	ALIVE201	Another Winter Alive	GospelbeacH	
2018	ALIVE200	Everything's Gonna be Alright	Handsome Jack	
2018	ALIVE199	Out Of My Head	Paul Collins	
2018	ALIVE198	Inside The Flesh Hotel	Beechwood	
2018	ALIVE197	Dirty Photographs	The Bonnevilles	
2018	ALIVE196	Songs From The Land Of Nod	Beechwood	
2017	ALIVE195	Death And The Blues	Mark "Porkchop" Holder	
2017	ALIVE194	Alive And Well In Ohio	Buffalo Killers	
2017	ALIVE193	Dreamin'/Change Of Heart	GospelbeacH	45 rpm bonus single w/ LP
2017	ALIVE192	Another Summer Of Love	GospelbeacH	
2017	ALIVE190	Listen For Tone	The Bonnevilles	Record Store Day Special
2017	ALIVE189	Claw Machine Wizard	Left Lane Cruiser	
2017	ALIVE188	Let It Slide	Mark "Porkchop" Holder	
2017	ALIVE187	S/T	Heath Green and The Makeshifters	
2016	ALIVE186	Bigger Than Life	Jack Lee	
2016	ALIVE185	Hairy Mountain	Datura4	
2016	ALIVE184	Blood On The Keys	James Leg	
2016	ALIVE183	Live! In California	Radio Moscow	
2016	ALIVE181	Talking Loud	Sulfur City	
2016	ALIVE180	Arrow Pierce My Heart	The Bonnevilles	
2016	ALIVE179	Beck In Black	Left Lane Cruiser	Record Store Day Special
2016	ALIVE178	Cluster Of Pearls	Hollis Brown	
2016	ALIVE177	Victory Motel Sessions	King Mud w/ Left Lane Cruiser and Black Diamond Heavies	
2016	ALIVE176	White Horse	Dirty Streets	
2015	ALIVE175	West Of Anywhere	DM3	
2015	ALIVE174	Pacific Surf Line	GospelbeacH	
2015	ALIVE173	Below The Belt	James Leg	
2015	ALIVE172	Demon Blues	Datura4	
2015	ALIVE171	Dirty Spliff Blues	Left Lane Cruiser	
2015	ALIVE170	Primal Vinyl	Shoes	
2015	ALIVE168	Rock & Roll Is A Beautiful Thing - 20th Anniversary	Various Artists	Record Store Day Special
2015	ALIVE167	Fluff	Andy Gabbard	
2015	ALIVE166	Nine Lives And Forty-Fives	Prima Donna	
2014	ALIVE165	The White Man made me Do It	Swamp Dogg	
2014	ALIVE163	Let Loose!	The Bloodhounds	
2014	ALIVE162	Do What Comes naturally	Handsome Jack	
2014	ALIVE161	Feel The Noise	Paul Collins	
2014	ALIVE160	Magical Dirt	Radio Moscow	
2014	ALIVE159	More Primitive	Lonesome Shack	
2014	ALIVE158	Gets Loaded	Hollis Brown	Record Store Day Special
2014	ALIVE157	Get Pure	Mount Carmel	
2014	ALIVE156	The Good Life	John The Conqueror	
2013	ALIVE155	"123-123 b/w Midsummer Sleigh Ride"	Beachwood Sparks	45 rpm bonus single w/ LP
2013	ALIVE154	Desert Skies	Beachwood Sparks	
2013	ALIVE153	The Brand New Z.Z. Hill Album	Z.Z. Hill	
2013	ALIVE152	I'm A Loser	Doris Duke	
2013	ALIVE151	Wolfmoon	Wolfmoon	
2013	ALIVE150	Too Many People In One Bed	Sandra Phillips	
2013	ALIVE149	Rock Them Back To Hell	Left Lane Cruiser	
2013	ALIVE148	Blades of Grass	Dirty Streets	
2013	ALIVE147	High & Low Down	Lightnin' Slim	
2013	ALIVE146	Raw Spitt	Charlie Whitehead	
2013	ALIVE145	In Between Tears	Irma Thomas	
2013	ALIVE144	Gag A Maggot	Swamp Dogg	
2013	ALIVE143	Ohio Grass	Buffalo Killers	Record Store Day Special
2013	ALIVE142	Rat On!	Swamp Dogg	
2013	ALIVE141	Total Destruction To Your Mind	Swamp Dogg	
201	ALIVE140	Ride On The Train	Hollis Brown	
201	ALIVE139	"Total Destruction To Your Mind/There Is A Bomb In Gilead"	Lee Bains III & The Glory Fires	Detroit version, digital single
201	ALIVE138	"Blame It On Obama"	Andre Williams	digital single
2012	ALIVE137	Alive at The Deep Blues Fest	Various	Compilation
2012	ALIVE136	John The Conqueror	John The Conqueror	
2012	ALIVE135	Life	Andre Williams	
2012	ALIVE134	"Businessman's Guide To Witchcraft"	Waves of Fury	digital single
2012	ALIVE133	Thirst	Waves of Fury	
2012	ALIVE132	Dig. Sow. Love. Grow.	Buffalo Killers	
2012	ALIVE131	Painkillers	Left Lane Cruiser & James Leg	
2012	ALIVE130	There Is A Bomb In Gilead	Lee Bains III & The Glory Fires	
2012	ALIVE129	3 & 3 Quarters	Radio Moscow	
2012	ALIVE128	Beach Town Confidential	The Plimsouls	
2012	ALIVE127	Where Is Parker Griggs	Various	Compilation
2011	ALIVE126	Yours Until The Bitter End	Bloody Hollies	
2011	ALIVE125	Donkey Jacket	Henry’s Funeral Shoe	
2011	ALIVE124	The Great Escape of Leslie Magnafuzz	Radio Moscow	
2011	ALIVE123	3	Buffalo Killers	
2011	ALIVE122	Two of Everything	Brian Olive	
2011	ALIVE121	The Case Files	Peter Case	
2011	ALIVE120	Gardens	Gardens	
2011	ALIVE119	Solitary Pleasure	James Leg	
2011	ALIVE118	Junkyard Speed Ball	Left Lane Cruiser	
2011	ALIVE117	Crimes	Occult Detective Club	
2011	ALIVE116	A Haunted Person’s Guide To The Witches	Witches	
2010	ALIVE115	Taledragger	T-Model Ford & Gravel Road	
2010	ALIVE114	Most of What Follows Is True	The Sights	
2010	ALIVE113	Free DVD Giveaway	The Black Keys	Xmas promotion
2010	ALIVE112	Kill City	Iggy Pop & James Williamson	
2010	ALIVE111	White Noise Sound	White Noise Sound	
2010	ALIVE110	King of Power Pop!	Paul Collins	
2010	ALIVE109	Devotionals	Tyson Vogel	
2010	ALIVE108	Seemingly Solid Reality	Outrageous Cherry	
2010	ALIVE107	Scott Morgan	Scott Morgan	
2010	ALIVE106	Big Red & Barbacoa	Hacienda	
2010	ALIVE105	Live! Beg Borrow & Steal	The Plimsouls	
2010	ALIVE104	New Rituals	Mondo Drag	
2010	ALIVE103	The Ladies Man	T-Model Ford	
2009	ALIVE102	Alive As Fuck	Black Diamond Heavies	
2009	ALIVE101	Walking Out On Love	The Breakaways w/ Peter Case and Paul Collins	
2009	ALIVE100	Big Deal	Brimstone Howl	
2009	ALIVE099	Live 1977	The Nerves	
2009	ALIVE098	All You Can Eat	Left Lane Cruiser	
2009	ALIVE097	Never Give Up On Your Hallucinations	Various	Compilation
2009	ALIVE096	Why Won’t You Let Me Be Black?	Nathaniel Mayer	
2009	ALIVE095	Brian Olive	Brian Olive	
2009	ALIVE094	The Perch	Trainwreck Riders	
2009	ALIVE093	Brain Cycles	Radio Moscow	
2009	ALIVE092	Universal Malcontents	Outrageous Cherry	
2009	ALIVE091	Everything’s For Sale	Henry’s Funeral Shoe	
2008	ALIVE090	One Way Ticket	The Nerves	
2008	ALIVE089	Loud Is The Night	Hacienda	
2008	ALIVE088	We Came In Peace	Brimstone Howl	
2008	ALIVE087	Live October 7, Orpheum Theatre, L.A.	Buffalo Killers	bonus CD w/ 0086 LP
2008	ALIVE086	Let It Ride	Buffalo Killers	
2008	ALIVE085	A Touch of Someone Else's Class	Black Diamond Heavies	
2008	ALIVE084	Ron Franklin	Ron Franklin	
2008	ALIVE083	Celebration	Thomas Function	
2008	ALIVE082	Break Your Arm	SSM	
2008	ALIVE081	Bring Yo' Ass to the Table	Left Lane Cruiser	
2008	ALIVE080	Nomad EP	Thomas Function	
2007	ALIVE079	Why Don’t You Give It To Me?	Nathaniel Mayer	
2007	ALIVE078	Guts of Steel	Brimstone Howl	
2007	ALIVE077	Radio Moscow	Radio Moscow	
2007	ALIVE076	Live 1978 Masonic Temple, Detroit	Sonic’s Rendezvous Band	
2007	ALIVE075	Who To Trust, Who To Kill, Who To Love	Bloody Hollies	
2007	ALIVE074	Every Damn Time	Black Diamond Heavies	
2006	ALIVE073	Nothing to You (re-mix) + 3	Two Gallants	
2006	ALIVE072	The Throes	Two Gallants	
2006	ALIVE071	EP-1	SSM	
2006	ALIVE070	Buffalo Killers	Buffalo Killers	
2006	ALIVE069	Lonely Road Revival	Trainwreck Riders	
2006	ALIVE068	Milky Ways	Milky Ways	
2006	ALIVE067	SSM	SSM	
2006	ALIVE066	Hardest Walk	Soledad Brothers	
2006	ALIVE065	The Love Drunks	The Love Drunks	
2005	ALIVE064	Yoo Doo Right, Yoo Doo Slide	All Tomorrow’s Party	
2005	ALIVE063	If Footmen Tire You	Bloody Hollies	
2005	ALIVE062	Fall In Love All Over Again With	Colonel Knowledge & the Lickety Splits	
2005	ALIVE061	Guilty As Sin	Stoneage Hearts w/ Dom Mariani	
2005	ALIVE060	Car Wash	Howlin’ Diablos	
2005	ALIVE059	We Don’t Care About Your Good Time	Turpentine Brothers	
2004	ALIVE058	"I’m Her Man"	Two Gallants	7”
2004	ALIVE057	X Descendant	Rosetta West	
2004	ALIVE056	"Round and Round"	Germs	7"
2004	ALIVE055	Static Vision	Detonations	
2004	ALIVE054	The Throes	Two Gallants	
2004	ALIVE053	Free Energy	The Red Tyger Church	
2004	ALIVE052	School of Etiquette	Boyskout	
2004	ALIVE051	Maximum Overdrive	Streetwalkin’ Cheetahs	
2004	ALIVE050	The Sound of San Francisco	Various	Compilation
2004	ALIVE049	Everything For The First Time	Big Midnight	
2004	ALIVE048	Kosher Boogie	Very Ape	
2004	ALIVE047	The Moan	The Black Keys	
2003	ALIVE046	Doin’ Alright	Big Midnight	7”
2002	ALIVE045	Rodeo Tandem Beat Specter	Thee Michelle Gun Elephant	
2002	ALIVE044	The Big Come Up	The Black Keys	
2001	ALIVE043	Collection	Thee Michelle Gun Elephant	
2000	ALIVE042	The Last Bandit w/bonus CD	Nikki Sudden	
2000	ALIVE041	Sweep The Desert	Swell Maps	
2000	ALIVE040	Gear Blues	Thee Michelle Gun Elephant	
1999	ALIVE039	November’s Heat	Certain General	
1999	ALIVE038	Old Skars & Upstarts	Various	Compilation
1999	ALIVE037	Put The Strength In The Final Blow	U.S. Bombs	
1999	ALIVE036	"Forming"	Germs	7”
1999	ALIVE035	International Rescue	Swell Maps	
1999	ALIVE034	Left For Dead	Libertine	7"
1998	ALIVE033	Never Mind The Open Minds	U.S. Bombs	LP version of 024
1997	ALIVE032	Cherry Bomb	The Runaways/The Streetwalkin’ Cheetahs featuring Deniz Tek	
1997	ALIVE031	Do The Pop	The Streetwalkin’ Cheetahs w/ Deniz Tek	
1997	ALIVE030	Overdrive	Streetwalkin’ Cheetahs	
1997	ALIVE029	Ready To Crack	Dripping Lips featuring Brian James	
1997	ALIVE028	My Heaven	Dripping Lips featuring Brian James	
1997	ALIVE027	Down & Dirty	PepGirlz	
1996	ALIVE026	Darling’s Out of Cocktail	Mr. Gloria’s Head	
1996	ALIVE025	Dodge Main	Dodge Main w/ Wayne Kramer, Deniz Tek, Scott Morgan	
1996	ALIVE024	Never Mind The Open Minds	U.S. Bombs	
1996	ALIVE023	Full Circle	John Sinclair w/ Wayne Kramer	
1996	ALIVE022	Eating Jello with a Heated Fork	Mick Farren and Deviants IXVI	
1996	ALIVE021	Satan Vs. The Working Man	RF7	
1996	ALIVE020	Heart Full of Napalm	The Streetwalkin’ Cheetahs	
1996	ALIVE019	Garibaldi Guard	U.S. Bombs	
1996	ALIVE018	Super Everything	Black Angel’s Death Song	
1996	ALIVE017	U.S. Bombs	U.S. Bombs	
1996	ALIVE016	Persecution Blues	The Powder Monkeys	10"
1995	ALIVE015	Feed My Sleaze	Murder Junkies	
1995	ALIVE014	Ptooff!	The Deviants	
1995	ALIVE013	The Deathray Tapes	Mick Farren & The Deviants	
1996	ALIVE012	Terror In America	G.G. Allin	
1995	ALIVE011	The Masturbation Session 10”	G.G. Allin	
1995	ALIVE010	Friday the 13th	Wayne Kramer & John Sinclair	
1995	ALIVE009	Devil’s Lullaby	Neither/Neither World	
1995	ALIVE008	Ice Pick Slim	MC5	10”
1994	USM1027	Bad News From The Underworld	Kim Fowley	
1994	ALIVE007	Worm Culture	Kim Fowley	
1994	ALIVE006	Crimp In The Facts	Bed of Eyes	
1994	ALIVE005	Power Trip	MC5	10”
1994	ALIVE004	Kill Them All	G.G. Allin	10”
1994	ALIVE003	Tales of True Crime	Neither/Neither World	
1994	ALIVE002	Cheyenne	Martin Rev	
1993	ALIVE001	Brutality and Bloodshed for All	G.G. Allin	
