= He Put the Bomp! In the Bomp =

Compilation album by Various Artists
- Released: November 20, 2007
- Recorded: 2007
- Genre: Garage rock, indie rock
- Length: 71:51
- Label: Bomp

Professional ratings
Review scores
Source	Rating
Allmusic	3.5/5 stars

He Put the Bomp! In the Bomp is a Greg Shaw tribute album released in November 2007 by Bomp Records in the USA and Vivid Sound Corporation in Japan. The album features 23 classic songs covered by different bands having in common the raw approach to rock and roll music Shaw most liked.

== Tracks ==
No.	Title	Writer(s)	Artist	Length
1.	"Good Times"	The Easybeats	The Plimsouls	4:25
2.	"She's Just a Girl on the Block"	The Zeros	The Briefs	2:46
3.	"Can't Find My Mind"	The Cramps	The Black Keys	2:12
4.	"What's Wrong with You?"	Bratmobile	Lyres	3:14
5.	"I Gotta Way with Girls"	The Chesterfield Kings	The Fuzztones	3:07
6.	"I Wonder"	The Gants	Outrageous Cherry	2:33
7.	"Him or Me – What's It Gonna Be?"	Paul Revere & the Raiders	The Dukes of Earlwood	2:49
8.	"Don't You Ever Think I Cry"	Rockin' Horse	Buffalo Killers	4:31
9.	"What a Way to Die"	The Pleasure Seekers	Nikki Corvette & the Hell On Heels	2:09
10.	"Screwed Up"	Mick Farren	SSM	3:04
11.	"The Trip"	Kim Fowley	The Morning After Girls	4:40
12.	"I Just Want to Make Love to You"	Willie Dixon	Radio Moscow	2:52
13.	"I'm Dissatisfied"	The Crawdaddys	Loons	2:26
14.	"Slow Death"	Flamin' Groovies	Brimstone Howl	3:55
15.	"Walkin' the Dog"	Rufus Thomas	Soledad Brothers	2:25
16.	"Chunk of Steel"	Golden Earring	The Stalkers	2:03
17.	"Sonic Reducer"	The Dead Boys	Coffin Lids	2:56
18.	"Beat Your Heart Out"	The Zeros	The Konks	2:42
19.	"Pablo Picasso"	Jonathan Richman	The Last	3:50
20.	"Kill City"	Iggy Pop	Captain Sensible/Nikki Sudden	2:31
21.	"Red Temple Prayer (Two Headed Dog)"	Roky Erickson	The Barracudas	3:00
22.	"Life of Crime"	The Weirdos	Dwarves	2:48
23.	"Hey Man"	Spacemen 3	Warlocks	4:53
