= Radio Moscow (disambiguation) =

Radio Moscow was the Soviet Union's official international broadcasting station.

Radio Moscow may also refer to:

- Radio Moscow (band), an American psychedelic rock band
  - Radio Moscow (album), their debut album, 2007
- "Radio Moscow", a song by Moloko from the album Things to Make and Do, 2000
