= Ohio Grass =

Studio album by Buffalo Killers
- Released: April 20, 2013
- Recorded: Ultrasuede Studios in Cincinnati, Ohio
- Genre: Blues rock
- Length: 37:56
- Label: Alive Naturalsound

Buffalo Killers chronology
Dig. Sow. Love. Grow. (2012)	Ohio Grass (2013)	Heavy Reverie (2014)

Professional ratings
Review scores
Source	Rating
AllMusic	3.5/5 stars

Ohio Grass is the fifth release by the American blues rock band Buffalo Killers. The album was released for Record Store Day on April 20, 2013. It features 7 studio recordings and 3 live recordings. Alive Naturalsound Records released the album on limited-edition colored vinyl, as well as on CD.

== Track listing ==
All songs composed and arranged by Andrew Gabbard and Zachary Gabbard.

1. "Baptized" – 3:07
2. "Nothing Can Bring Me Down" – 3:12
3. "Grow Your Own" – 3:51
4. "Golden Eagle" – 5:16
5. "Hold You Me" – 4:38
6. "Some Other Kind" – 3:03
7. "Good Feeling*" – 3:42
8. "Jon Jacob (Live)*" – 3:04
9. "Hey Girl (Live)*" – 4:26
10. "Move On (Live)*" – 3:42

== Personnel ==
- Andrew Gabbard – guitar, vocals, piano
- Zachary Gabbard – bass guitar, vocals, guitar
- Joseph Sebaali – drums, piano, harpsichord

Production

- Buffalo Killers – production
- Mike Montgomery – recording and mixing
- Joshua Marc Levy & Asheville Art family – art direction, design and illustration
- Live tracks captured by Arthur Creech
