= New Beginnings (Radio Moscow album) =

Studio album by Radio Moscow
- Released: September 29, 2017
- Recorded: Big Fish Studios, Encinitas, California
- Genre: Psychedelic rock, blues rock, hard rock, acid rock
- Length: 39:14
- Label: Century Media Records
- Producer: Parker Griggs

Radio Moscow chronology
Magical Dirt (2014)	New Beginnings (2017)

New Beginnings is the fifth studio album by American psychedelic rock band Radio Moscow (or their sixth album, if the 2012 album 3 & 3 Quarters, which was a collection of demos recorded and produced in 2003 by frontman Parker Griggs before the formation of the band, is included). It is their first album with Century Media Records having all previous releases been with Alive Naturalsound.

== Track listing ==
All tracks written by Parker Griggs unless otherwise stated.

No.	Title	Length
1.	"New Beginning"	4:08
2.	"Deceiver"	3:55
3.	"Woodrose Morning" (instrumental)	2:32
4.	"Driftin'"	2:52
5.	"No One Knows Where They've Been" (written by Marrone)	4:37
6.	"Last To Know"	4:58
7.	"New Skin" (instrumental)	3:03
8.	"Pacing" (co-written with Meier and Marrone)	3:45
9.	"Pick Up The Pieces"	3:22
10.	"Dreams" (co-written with Meier and Marrone)	6:02

== Personnel ==
Radio Moscow

- Parker Griggs – vocals, guitars, drums and percussion (on track 9 only), production, mixing
- Anthony Meier – bass
- Paul Marrone – drums and percussion (on all except track 9), piano (on track 5)

Additional personnel

- Travis Baucum – harmonica (on tracks 4 & 6)
- Mike Butler – engineering
- Mark Chalecki – mastering
- Courtney Cole – artwork
- Dana Trippe – photography
- Nora Dirkling – layout
