= Sergi Estella =

- Born: Catalonia
- Origin: Catalonia
- Occupations: Singer, multi-instrumentalist, songwriter
- Instruments: Guitar, banjo, dobro, homemade instruments
- Years active: 2010–present
- Label: Independent
- Website: sergiestella.com

Sergi Estella is a Catalan singer, multi-instrumentalist, and songwriter stylistically associated with blues, American folk, southern rock, and rock and roll. He currently performs solo, emulating the popular one man bands (solo artists who play more than one instrument, also known as human orchestras) of American blues.

== Biography ==
Estella studied musical education at the University of Barcelona (2010) and completed the intermediate degree at L'Aula (the Liceu Conservatory of Jazz and Modern Music, 2011). He is known for building his own instruments; he plays guitars made from broom handles, beer cans, or even a wooden box with a tap pouring wine, among others. Following blues aesthetics, his lyrics deal with everyday events and personal experiences, both in Catalan and English, with satirical humor that is also reflected in his stage presence.

=== Early years ===
Sergi Estella began to gain greater media attention in 2012, the year he won the Sona9 contest with a blues formation, the duo Empty Cage. Other bands in which he has participated include Solà & Estella and Veil and The Killing Hits.

=== Solo career ===
In 2017 he started his solo career with the release of his first album, Ho superes i et fots, with lyrics entirely in Catalan and recorded at Bucbonera Studios in Caldes de Montbui. His second album, Blood Like Wine, also self-released, was recorded at Tape Tone studios in Terrassa. In this work, he includes English lyrics and explores southern rock and American folk, introducing new instruments such as the banjo and the dobro. Among his influences are bands like Left Lane Cruiser and musicians such as Scott H. Biram, Justin Townes Earle, and Johnny Cash, whose songs he also covers in his live performances.

Estella has performed across Catalonia over the last ten years in a variety of venues, including the now-closed Rocksound in Barcelona, the Barnasants festival, La Capsa, the Cerdanyola del Vallès Blues Festival, the Rootsound Festival in Barcelona, and the Deskomunal venue in Barcelona, presenting his second album. He has also performed at international events such as the Villa Sessions Blues Festival, held in Vila do Conde, Portugal.

Sergi Estella is a multifaceted artist who also leads workshops for children where they learn how to make musical instruments. At the end of 2019, he joined the Circ Pistolet company to compose the music for the circus project "Potser no hi ha final" ("Maybe There Is No End"), which was delayed due to the COVID-19 pandemic but eventually premiered in December 2020. In the summer of 2022, he performed at the Smoking Guitar Festival in Pleutersbach (Baden-Württemberg), as part of a tour in Germany and Italy.

== Awards ==
Winner of the Sona9 contest with the duo Empty Cage (2012)

In 2017, Estella won the 39th Saltija Song Competition for his song Màrtirs Quotidians ("Everyday Martyrs"), as well as the event's public vote award.

First prize at the C. B. Gitty International Cigar Box Video Playoffs (2021)

== Discography ==
=== Albums released with bands ===
Sergi Estella i els assaltadors de tàlems (Sonitrons, 2010)

Tal com raja (2013) with the band Empty Cage

Moneda de tres cares (2019) with the band Empty Cage

=== Solo albums ===
Ho superes i et fots (self-released, 2017)

Blood Like Wine (self-released, 2021)
