= Heavy Reverie =

Studio album by Buffalo Killers
- Released: May 27, 2014
- Recorded: Ultrasuede Studios in Cincinnati, Ohio
- Genre: Blues rock
- Length: 30:45
- Label: Alive Naturalsound
- Producer: Buffalo Killers & Mike Montgomery

Buffalo Killers chronology
Dig. Sow. Love. Grow. (2012)	Heavy Reverie (2014)	Alive and Well in Ohio (2017)

Professional ratings
Review scores
Source	Rating
AllMusic	3.5/5 stars

Heavy Reverie was released on May 27, 2014, by the American blues rock band Buffalo Killers. This was the band's fifth studio release on Alive Naturalsound Records as a Compact Disc in addition to various colored vinyls in limited numbers.

== Track listing ==
All songs composed and arranged by Andrew Gabbard and Zachary Gabbard.

1. "Poisonberry Tide" – 3:01
2. "Dig On In" – 2:22
3. "This Girl Has Grown" – 3:42
4. "Cousin Todd" – 2:30
5. "Sandbox" – 3:17
6. "Who You Are?" – 2:23
7. "Grape Peel (How I Feel)*" – 3:48
8. "Louder Than Your Lips*" – 3:02
9. "Shake*" – 2:48
10. "January" – 3:58

== Personnel ==
Buffalo Killers

- Andrew Gabbard – guitar, vocals, piano
- Zachary Gabbard – bass guitar, vocals, guitar
- Joseph Sebaali – drums, piano, harpsichord
- Sven Kahns – guitar, vocals

Production

- Recorded & Mastered by Mike Montgomery at Candyland
