= Most of What Follows Is True =

Studio album by The Sights
- Released: 2010
- Label: Alive

The Sights chronology
Silver/Gold (2009)	Most of What Follows Is True (2010)	Left Over Right (2012)

Most of What Follows is True is an album by American rock-and-roll band The Sights.

Professional ratings
Review scores
Source	Rating
Allmusic	4/5 stars
Loud and Quiet	1/10
Paste	5/10
Popmatters	8/10
