= Parker Griggs =

American singer

- Origin: Story City, Iowa, United States
- Genres: Psychedelic rock, blues rock, hard rock, stoner rock, garage rock
- Occupations: Musician, singer-songwriter, record producer
- Instruments: Guitar, vocals, drums, percussion
- Years active: 2003–present
- Label: Alive Naturalsound Records
- Website: radiomoscow.net

Parker Griggs is an American psychedelic rock musician, multi-instrumentalist, singer-songwriter and record producer. He is the lead vocalist, guitarist and founder of the rock band Radio Moscow.

== Career ==
Before the formation of Radio Moscow, Griggs was a fan of Cream, Blue Cheer and Led Zeppelin. He was known under his solo stage name as Garbage Composal and completed an album's worth of material before finding a bassist named Serana Andersen to form Radio Moscow in 2003. When recording, Griggs would play both guitar and drums. However, the band were known as a trio due to various live drummers joining the band as tour members.

After the duo relocated to Colorado, Griggs managed to hand a demo to The Black Keys frontman Dan Auerbach. Radio Moscow were then helped by Auerbach in getting signed to Alive Naturalsound Records. The band then returned to Iowa and new bassist Luke McDuff was brought in. Griggs and McDuff then recorded the band's debut album in 2006, with Auerbach handling production duties. Radio Moscow was released in February 2007.

In April 2009, the band self-produced their second studio album Brain Cycles. In 2011, Griggs produced The Great Escape of Leslie Magnafuzz by himself and in 2012 3 & 3 Quarters was released which featured Griggs only. This is because the material from the album was written and recorded before the formation of Radio Moscow. In January 2012, Alive released a compilation album titled "Where is Parker Griggs?" Griggs then released Magical Dirt with Radio Moscow in June 2014.

Alongside Mario Rubalcaba of Earthless, and fellow Radio Moscow Member, Paul Marrone, Griggs founded Alpine Fuzz Society, a side project from Radio Moscow, with intentions of playing more Garage Rock oriented music.

== Style ==
Reviewing the band's self-titled album for music website AllMusic, Greg Prato of AllMusic described the group's sound as "a throwback to the classic rock of the '70s", comparing certain songs to artists such as Ram Jam, The Allman Brothers Band and The Jeff Beck Group. He admired Griggs' voice describing it as "powerful, but stylish". Following the release of Brain Cycles, the band have also been cited as an example of the stoner rock genre.

== Discography ==
Studio albums

with Radio Moscow

- Radio Moscow (2007)
- Brain Cycles (2009)
- The Great Escape of Leslie Magnafuzz (2011)
- 3 & 3 Quarters (2012) – a collection of demos recorded in 2003 by Griggs before the formation of the band
- Magical Dirt (2014)
- New Beginnings (2017)

EPs

- Rancho Tehama EP (2013)

with El Perro

- Hair Of (2022)
