= Nathaniel Mayer =

American songwriter

Nathaniel Mayer (February 10, 1944 – November 1, 2008) was an American rhythm and blues singer, who started his career in the early 1960s at Fortune Records in his birthplace of Detroit, Michigan. "Nay Dog" or "Nate," as he was also known, had a raw, highly energetic vocal style and wild stage show. After a 35-year absence from music, in 2002 Mayer began recording and touring again, releasing albums with Fat Possum, Alive Records and Norton Records.

== Career ==
Mayer started his career at Fortune Records, a Detroit record label owned by Jack and Devora Brown. There he became label-mates with fellow Fortune stars Nolan Strong and Andre Williams. Mayer would stay with the label for six years, recording a handful of records.

When Mayer was 18 years old he scored a Top 40 hit record in 1962 with "Village of Love," credited to Nathaniel Mayer and The Fabulous Twilights. It was originally released on Fortune Records, who then leased the record to United Artists Records for wider distribution. Follow-ups such as "Leave Me Alone" (1962) and "I Had A Dream" (1963) failed to duplicate the success of "Village of Love" (although both records, especially "Leave Me Alone," sold well regionally). In 1966, Mayer released "I Want Love and Affection (Not The House Of Correction)," a funky offering in the James Brown vein. He then split with Fortune Records due to differences.

== Post Fortune Records ==
After Mayer's Fortune Records days, his whereabouts were practically unknown and only ever confirmed by rumors for several decades. Though he did surface in 1980 to record the "Raise the Curtain High" single. It would be the only release from Mayer between 1966 and 2002. Disappearing into the ghettos of East Detroit for the next two decades, rumors abounded. However, after Norton Records released "I Don't Want No Bald-Headed Woman Telling Me What to Do" in 2002 (a never before released recording from 1968), Mayer was inspired to record and perform again.

Mayer staged a full-fledged musical comeback in 2002. His once-sweet soul scream had deepened to a rasping growl, giving his latter albums a whole new feel. He played clubs and festivals, gaining a new generation of fans with his exciting live shows.

In 2004, Mayer returned to the studio to record I Just Want to Be Held for Fat Possum Records, a Mississippi label known mostly for releasing records by obscure bluesmen. In 2005, he toured with fellow Fat Possum artist The Black Keys. In 2006, the Dutch-based Stardumb Records released a 7" single featuring three songs taken from the Fat Possum album.

Mayer's last sessions were released across two albums, 2007's Why Don't You Give It To Me? and 2009's Why Won't You Let Me Black?, both on Alive Records and featuring Dan Auerbach of The Black Keys, Matthew Smith of Outrageous Cherry, Troy Gregory of The Dirtbombs, and Dave Shettler of SSM and The Sights. Why Don't You Give It To Me? was Julian Cope's Album of the Month on his Head Heritage site in May 2008.

The Detroit Cobras remade "Village of Love" in 1996. While "Leave Me Alone" was covered by The Hard Feelings in 2001. Eve Monsees, The Exiles and the Gibson Brothers have all recorded "I Had A Dream."

In 2014, Nathaniel Mayer was inducted into the Michigan Rock and Roll Legends Hall of Fame.

== Death ==
Within a year after completing his first European tour, Mayer suffered multiple strokes. After months of hospitalization, Nathaniel Mayer died on November 1, 2008, in Detroit, Michigan. In 2017 the Killer Blues Headstone Project placed the headstone for Nathaniel Mayer at Elmwood Cemetery in Detroit.

== Discography ==
=== Albums ===
- Going Back To...The Village of Love (1963, Fortune Records; CD is a 1996 compilation with 11 bonus tracks, Gold Dust Records, Italian bootleg import)
- I Want Love and Affection (Not the House of Correction) (1966, Fortune; re-released on Vampi Soul in 2011)
- I Just Want to Be Held (2004, Fat Possum Records)
- Anthology: I Want Love and Affection [2xLP / CD digipack] (2006, Vampi Soul)
- Why Don't You Give It To Me? (2007, Alive-Naturalsound Records)
- Why Won't You Let Me Be Black? (2009, Alive-Naturalsound Records)

=== Singles ===
- "My Last Dance With You" / "My Little Darling" (1961) Fortune 542
- "Village of Love" / "I Want a Woman" (1962) Fortune 545; United Artists 449
- "Hurting Love" / "Leave Me Alone" (1962) Fortune 547; United Artists 487
- "Mr. Santa Claus (Bring Me My Baby)" / "Well, I've Got News (For You)" (1962) Fortune 550
- "Well, I've Got News (For You)" / "Work It Out" (1963) Fortune 550
- "I Had a Dream" / "I'm Not Gonna Cry" (1963) Fortune 554
- "Going Back To The Village of Love" / "My Last Dance With You" [re-make] (1964) Fortune 557
- "A Place I Know" / "Don't Come Back" (1964) Fortune 562
- "I Want Love and Affection (Not the House of Correction)" / "From Now On" (1966) Fortune 567
- "Raise the Curtain High" / "Super Boogie" (1980) Love Dog 101
- "I Don't Want No Bald Headed Woman Telling Me What To Do" / "I Don't Want No Bald Headed Woman Telling Me What To Do" (instrumental) (2002; recorded 1968) Norton 107
- "Ride In My 225" / "Mister Santa Claus" [live] (2005) Norton 126
- "I Found Out" (2006) Stardumb Records
