= SSM (band) =

American garage punk band

SSM (Szymanski, Shettler, Morris)
- SSM playing live, Europe 2007

Background information
- Origin: Detroit, Michigan, U.S.
- Genres: Garage punk Garage rock
- Years active: 2005–present
- Labels: Alive Records; Howl Records
- Members: John Szymanski; David Shettler; Marty Morris

SSM are an American garage punk band from Detroit, Michigan, United States, who are signed to Alive Records and feature members of The Hentchmen, The Sights, and The Cyril Lords.

== Career ==
Taking their band name from their last names, the post-punk trio, SSM, are composed of John Szymanski (vocals, Farfisa organ, synth bass organ, synthesizers, mellotron), Dave Shettler (drums, vocals, drum machine) and Marty Morris (vocals, guitar). They are known for their work with The Hentchmen, The Sights, and The Cyril Lords, respectively, before forming SSM in July, 2005.

SSM wrote the bulk of their debut, LP1, in one week, and recorded it in two days in Akron, OH with Dan Auerbach producing and playing slide guitar on the track, Dinosaur. The group played their debut performance at the Garden Bowl in Detroit, and their second public show opening for The Black Keys in Cleveland at the Beachland Tavern outside The Beachland Ballroom. After that show, The Black Keys invited SSM to be main support on their 2005 West Coast tour of North America.

Working as their publicist, a friend of the group mailed LP1—a self-released CD-R with a cover screen-printed on cardboard and a Polaroid of the band slipped inside—for review to the New York Times. Jon Pareles from the Times called the group "the heretics of three-chord rock'" and gave it a favorable review:

"There are two differences between SSM's "LP1" (Shmosz) and countless garage-rock revivals: the sound is scruffier and the songs are smarter. John Szymanski (keyboards, vocals), Dave Shettler (drums) and Marty Morris (guitar), have been playing garage rock in other Detroit bands; after a month of collaboration, they recorded this album in two days. Unruly analog keyboards and dinky rhythm machines define the sound as much as overloaded fuzz-tone guitar, and the tunes slip free of three-chord orthodoxy. The old garage-rock lust is there, but so are tidings of apocalypse and sardonic opening lines like "Sorry I never sent no flowers when she overdosed." Despite the vintage equipment, this is no 1960's revival; it's a warped reinvention."

Their debut studio album, SSM, was recorded in Corktown, Detroit with C Laszlo Koltay at High Bias Recordings and released on Alive Records in 2006 to much critical acclaim, followed later that same year by EP1. Each cover featured distinctive artwork painted by Matt Gordon. The group toured the US, UK, and Europe extensively, and played with such acts as The Datsuns, The Bellrays, Mission of Burma, Radio Birdman, Miss Alex White and the Red Orchestra, the Black Diamond Heavies, Nathaniel Mayer, and King Khan & BBQ Show. After touring as main support for The Von Bondies, the band released Break Your Arm For Evolution in January 2008.

Recorded in 2007 in Akron by Auerbach in his basement studio and mixed in Detroit with Koltay, Break Your Arm for Evolution was once again reviewed in the Times:

"The kind of distortion that edges the vocals and most of the instruments on the album “Break Your Arm for Evolution” (Alive) tags SSM as garage-rock or psychedelia, and most of the songs would go nicely with a liquid-blob light show. But this three-man band, John Szymanski on keyboards, Dave Shettler on drums and Marty Morris on guitar doesn't stay within any particular school or era. SSM also toys with electro, progressive rock and punk-funk. What the songs share is a cantankerous rock spirit and, behind it, musings on life and death, from “Let's Make a Baby” to thoughts like “Before long you're gone, so prolong the inevitable” which is tucked into a song called “Start Dancing.”"

== Members ==
- John Szymanski - Vocals, Farfisa organ, Hohner Synth Bass, Synthesizers, Mellotron
- Dave Shettler - Drums, Vocals, Drum machines, samples
- Marty Morris - Guitar, Vocals

== Discography ==
=== Albums ===
- LP1 (2005) Shmosz Records
- SSM (2006) Alive Records
- EP1 (2006) Alive Records
- Break Your Arm For Evolution (2008) Alive Records
- SSM (2010) Howl Records

=== Appears On ===
- Album: The Sweet Sounds of Detroit - Volume One

CD Compilation (2006) Bellyache Records
Track: Candy Loving

- Album: He Put the Bomp! In the Bomp

CD Compilation (2007) Bomp! Records
Track: Screwed Up

- Album: Human Fly at the Zombie Club

Human Fly (FR) (2008)
la Croquette de L'Espace Records
Track: Zombie Club (with SSM)
