= SPEED! Nebraska Records =

SPEED! Nebraska Records is a record label based in Omaha, Nebraska. They specialize in putting out 45s by local bands.

== Bands ==
- The Bombardment Society
- Brimstone Howl
- The Carsinogents
- D is for Dragster
- Domestica
- Entertainment (band)
- Frontier Trust
- Fullblown
- The Killigans
- Ideal Cleaners
- Mercy Rule
- The Mezcal Bros.
- The Monroes
- Pioneer Disaster
- The Sons Of
- Techlepathy

== See also ==
- List of record labels
