= Magical Dirt =

Studio album by Radio Moscow
- Released: June 17, 2014
- Recorded: Big Fish Studios, Encinitas, California
- Genre: Psychedelic rock, blues rock, garage rock, hard rock, acid rock
- Length: 41:18
- Label: Alive Naturalsound
- Producer: Parker Griggs

Radio Moscow chronology
3 & 3 Quarters (2012)	Magical Dirt (2014)	New Beginnings (2017)

Magical Dirt is the fourth studio album by American psychedelic rock band Radio Moscow (or their fifth studio album, if the 2012 album 3 & 3 Quarters, which was a collection of demos recorded and produced in 2003 by frontman Parker Griggs before the formation of the band, is included).

== Track listing ==
No.	Title	Length
1.	"So Alone"	4:14
2.	"Rancho Tehama Airport"	3:36
3.	"Death of a Queen"	4:38
4.	"Sweet Lil Thing"	3:29
5.	"These Days"	4:09
6.	"Bridges"	5:19
7.	"Gypsy Fast Woman"	5:11
8.	"Got the Time"	2:56
9.	"Before It Burns"	4:23
10.	"Stinging"	3:23

== Personnel ==
Radio Moscow

- Parker Griggs – vocals, guitars, harmonica, production, mixing
- Anthony Meier – bass
- Paul Marrone – drums, percussion

Additional personnel

- Matt VanAllen – engineering, mixing
