= FGL =

FGL may refer to:

- FGL Productions, a French record company
- Fidelity & Guaranty Life, an American insurer
- Fifth-generation programming language
- Flagler Global Logistics, an American logistics company
- Florida Georgia Line, an American country music duo
- Florida Greyhound Lines, a defunct American bus operator
- FGL Sports Ltd., a Canadian sporting goods retailer
- Foster's Group, an Australian brewer
- Fulmar Gas Line, in the United Kingdom
- Futura Gael, a defunct Irish airline
- Federico García Lorca, a Spanish poet and playwright
