= Dig. Sow. Love. Grow. =

Dig. Sow. Love. Grove.

Studio album by Buffalo Killers
- Released: 2012
- Recorded: Ultrasuede Studios in Cincinnati, Ohio
- Genre: Blues rock
- Length: 35:24
- Label: Alive Naturalsound
- Producer: N/A

Buffalo Killers chronology
3 (2011)	Dig. Sow. Love. Grove. (2012)	Ohio Grass (2013)

Professional ratings
Review scores
Source	Rating
Allmusic	4.5/5 stars

Dig. Sow. Love. Grow. is the fourth studio album by American blues rock band Buffalo Killers. It was released in 2012 on Alive Naturalsound Records as a Compact Disc in addition to various colored vinyl in limited numbers.

== Track listing ==
All songs composed and arranged by Andrew Gabbard and Zachary Gabbard.

1. "Get It" – 3:11
2. "Hey Girl" – 4:14
3. "Blood on Your Hands" – 2:45
4. "Rolling Wheel" – 3:40
5. "Those Days" – 2:36
6. "I Am Always Here" – 4:00
7. "Farwell" – 3:54
8. "Graffiti Eggplant" – 2:38
9. "My Sun" – 3:46
10. "Moon Daisy" – 4:44

== Personnel ==
Buffalo Killers

- Andrew Gabbard – guitar, vocals, piano
- Zachary Gabbard – bass guitar, vocals, guitar
- Joseph Sebaali – drums, piano, harpsichord
