= Pee-Wee Get My Gun =

Studio album by T-Model Ford
- Released: 1997
- Genre: Blues
- Label: Fat Possum
- Producer: Matthew Johnson, Bruce Watson

T-Model Ford chronology
Pee-Wee Get My Gun (1997)	You Better Keep Still (1999)

Pee-Wee Get My Gun is the debut album by the American musician T-Model Ford, released in 1997. Ford was 75 years old when the album was released. He supported it by touring with labelmate R. L. Burnside; the dates represented the first time Ford had performed outside of Mississippi.

== Production ==
Ford wrote all of the album's songs, although he was not shy about lifting ideas from other songwriters. He was backed by his drummer, Tommy Lee "Spam" Miles. Frank Frost played keyboards on some of the tracks, despite the fact that he did not get along with Ford and had to be goaded by coproducer Matthew Johnson to participate in the recording sessions. The producers decided to keep Ford's mistakes, which included bad tunings and coughing fits. Many of the songs reference the violent acts that Ford had both administered and received.

== Critical reception ==
Professional ratings
Review scores
Source	Rating
AllMusic	3/5 stars
The Penguin Guide to Blues Recordings	2.5/4 stars
Reno Gazette-Journal	2.5/4 stars
The Tampa Tribune	3/4 stars
Winnipeg Sun	4/5 stars

Guitar Player opined that "T-Model's ravaged voice and harrowing guitar attack are quite literally stunning." The Santa Fe New Mexican praised the "demented songs of love and violence and human endurance." CMJ New Music Monthly concluded that "this is the timeless blues, so alive and mysterious that it could have been recorded 60 years ago or 60 minutes ago."

The Chicago Tribune listed Pee-Wee Get My Gun as the third best blues album of 1997. The Commercial Appeal listed it as the fifth best album of the year. Newsday also considered the album to be among the best of 1997, writing that "there's little fancy fretwork in 76-year-old Ford's debut album, but that doesn't dilute the potency of his primitive grooves." The Rocket noted the "grind-in-the-grease, down-in-the-dirt jamming."

AllMusic said that the music "can be hypnotic or tedious, depending upon your taste." In 1999, Rolling Stone deemed Pee-Wee Get My Gun "a creditable batch of backwoods grooves."

== Track listing ==
1. "Cut You Loose"
2. "T-Model Theme Song"
3. "Been a Long Time"
4. "Turkey and the Rabbit"
5. "Can't Be Touched"
6. "Nobody Gets Me Down"
7. "I'm Insane"
8. "Where You Been"
9. "Feels So Bad"
10. "Sugar Farm"
11. "Let Me In"
