= The Bloody Hollies =

- Origin: Buffalo, New York / San Diego / The Desert Mountains
- Genres: Punk blues (later); Garage punk (early)
- Years active: 2000–present
- Labels: Sympathy for the Record Industry; Alive Records
- Website: bloodyhollies.com

The Bloody Hollies are an American punk rock band from Buffalo, New York, formed in 2000. Their lineup comprised three art school students. Their debut record, Got it Where it Counts!, came out on Garage Pop Records in 2002, and a local Buffalo paper named them the area's "Top New Original Band" that year. They signed to Sympathy for the Record Industry to release their sophomore effort, Fire At Will, in 2003. Three further albums arrived on Alive: If Footmen Tire You... in 2005, and Who to Trust, Who to Kill, Who to Love in 2007, and Yours Until the Bitter End in 2011.

== Style and influences ==
The group cites influences from AC/DC, the Blues Explosion, the Oblivians, Led Zeppelin, Motörhead, and The Stooges. Their sound was initially heavily indebted to garage punk a la The Devil Dogs and the New Bomb Turks, but later broadened their sound to incorporate elements of harmonica blues, swamp music, and hard rock.

== Members ==
Current

- Wesley Doyle - vocals, guitar, harmonica
- Joey Horgen - guitar
- Matthew Bennett - drums
- Bort-Erik Thunder - bass

Former

- Mike Argento - drums
- Phillip Freedenberg - bass
- Nick - bass
- Christopher Urbanski - bass

== Discography ==
- Got it Where it Counts! (Garage Pop Records, 2002)
- Fire at Will (Sympathy for the Record Industry, 2003)
- If Footmen Tire You... (Alive Records, 2005)
- Who to Trust, Who to Kill, Who to Love (Alive, 2007)
- Yours Until The Bitter End (Alive, 2011)
