= Hollis Brown (band) =

American rock band

- Origin: Queens, New York, U.S.
- Genres: Rock; roots; Americana; indie rock
- Years active: 2009–2023
- Labels: Alive Naturalsound; Mascot
- Past members: Mike Montali; Jonathan Bonilla; Andrew Zehnal; Adam Bock; Chris Urriola
- Website: hollisbrown.com

Hollis Brown is an American rock band from Queens, New York, formed in 2009 by singer and guitarist Mike Montali and guitarist Jonathan Bonilla. Named after Bob Dylan's song "Ballad of Hollis Brown", the band has become noted for their songwriting. Their music has been described as sounding "just as alive today as it would’ve in 1966 and will 40 years from now."

== History ==
Hollis Brown was founded by singer and guitarist Mike Montali and guitarist Jonathan Bonilla in New York in 2009. Friends since high school, they collaborated as songwriters before the band was formed. Their name was taken from Bob Dylan's "The Ballad of Hollis Brown," a song from his 1964 album The Times They Are a-Changin'. Bonilla later said the name was chosen because it sounded "very true to America, and because it comes from Bob Dylan, who’s the great American songwriter."

Former members of the band include Mike Wosczyk on bass, Mike Graves on drums and percussion, Dillon DeVito on bass, and Scott Thompson on bass. As of 2017 their current lineup includes Mike Montali and Jonathan Bonilla as the founders of the band. With them are Adam Bock on keyboards, Andrew Zehnal on drums, and Chris Urriola on bass.

== Music career ==
Hollis Brown began performing at New York clubs and had developed a significant regional following by the time they digitally released their 2009 debut EP, Nothing & the Famous No One. It was followed later that year by the self-released album Hollis Brown. Both records were positively received by the press, with No Depression writing "The band is tight, the lyrics can be inventive and memorable and the sparse production is just right." Spin said that the band "fizz and pop like fatback on a greasy skillet."

In March 2013, after touring throughout the US with artists including Deer Tick and Lucero, Hollis Brown released Ride on the Train. Recorded over a ten-day period in Nashville, it was produced by Adam Landry and released on Alive Naturalsound Records. In addition to touring the US, the band embarked on their first European tour and further developed their sound. At a Lou Reed benefit show in New York, they played the Velvet Underground Loaded album in its entirety. One of the first records that Bonilla and Montali bonded over, the performance inspired them to record a track-by-track interpretation of Loaded entitled Hollis Brown Gets Loaded. Originally released in a vinyl limited edition of 500 to mark Record Store Day, the album sold out quickly, and was subsequently made more widely available.

In 2014, with the lineup composed of Bonilla, Montali, Dillon Devito (bass, vocals), Andrew Zehnal (drums) and Adam Bock (keyboards and vocals), Hollis Brown began working on the album 3 Shots. It ultimately included the song "Rain Dance," which was built on an unfinished Bo Diddley track. Preceded by an encounter with the head of the Diddley estate, who offered the band the opportunity to record a song using a track found in Diddley's home studio after his death, it premiered at a March 2015 event in New Orleans which commemorated the 60th Anniversary of the "Bo Diddley Beat." Montali performed on Diddley's signature red square guitar

3 Shots evolved over a period of 18 months, with much of the songwriting taking place on the road. Most of the album was recorded by producer Don Dilego at his Velvet Elk home studio in the Pocono mountains, and mixed by John Agnello at Fluxivity Recording in Brooklyn, N.Y. In addition to the title track, 3 Shots featured the duet “Highway 1” with alt-country singer Nikki Lane. It was released on Jullian Records in April 2015. Later in 2015 Hollis Brown toured the US with Counting Crows, and once again returned to Europe.

In 2016, the band’s vinyl EP, "Cluster of Pearls" was chosen as one of the 300 select releases throughout the world for Record Store Day. Pressed on Starburst Vinyl, the record was limited to 800 copies and features four previously unreleased tracks and two songs released on vinyl for the first time. It was released digitally on iTunes in August 2016. Their song “Steady Ground” is a featured exclusive on Amazon’s playlist Amazon Acoustics, which was released in fall 2016. Hollis Brown’s single “Run Right To You” was released on digitally and on limited edition 7” vinyl in October 2016 on Velvet Elk/One Little Indian records. The B-side features a live cover of the Jesse Malin song "She Don't Love Me Now".

In addition to Counting Crows, Hollis Brown has toured with The Zombies, Citizen Cope, and Heartless Bastards. Their songs have been featured in the worldwide trailer for the Michael Keaton film “The Founder”, MTV's The Real World, Showtime’s Shameless, DirecTV's "Kingdom", the 2014 film Bad Country, which starred Willem Dafoe and Matt Dillon and an online ad campaign for Abercrombie & Fitch. The band's cover of the Cream song "Spoonful" appeared on the Alive Naturalsound 20th anniversary compilation Rock & Roll Is A Beautiful Thing, released in conjunction with Record Store Day 2015.

In 2018, it was announced that the band had signed to Mascot Records, with a new album expected the following year. Their new album Ozone Park was released on June 7, 2019, on Mascot Records/Cool Green Recordings.

In December of 2021, the band released a cover of "Under My Thumb" from The Rolling Stones. The song serves as the lead single from their upcoming Stones tribute album, In The Aftermath, expected February 4th, 2022.

A 2023 argument between Montali and Bonilla caused the band to go on hiatus, during which time Montali focused on working with Fantastic Cat. Hollis Brown would reunite in 2026 to release a new single titled "Garage Days."

== Discography ==
- Nothing & The Famous No One (2009)
- Hollis Brown (2009)
- Ride on the Train (2013, Alive/Alive Naturalsound Records)
- Hollis Brown Gets Loaded (2014, Alive/Alive Naturalsound Records)
- 3 Shots (2015, Jullian Records)
- Cluster Of Pearls (2016, Alive/Alive Naturalsound Records)
- Hollis Brown on Audiotree Live (2016, Audiotree Live)
- Steady Ground (2016, Jullian Records)
- Run Right To You - Single (2016, Velvet Elk Records/One Little Indian Records)
- Ozone Park (2019, Mascot Label Group/Cool Green Recordings)
- In The Aftermath (2022, Mascot Label Group/Cool Green Recordings)
