= Thee Shams =

American garage rock band

- Origin: Cincinnati, Ohio, United States
- Genres: Garage rock Southern rock
- Years active: 1999–2006
- Labels: Fat Possum, Shake It, Deary Me Records, Norton, Spoonful, Orange, Licorice Tree
- Past members: Zachary Gabbard; Andrew Gabbard; Joseph Sebaali; Max Bender; Keith Fox
- Website: TheeShams Myspace

Thee Shams (pronounced The Shams) was a garage rock band from Cincinnati, Ohio, consisting of Zachary Gabbard, Andrew Gabbard, Joey Sebaali, Chad Hardwick, Adam Wesley, Max Bender, and Keith Fox. They were signed to Mississippi's Fat Possum Records and also released records on Shake It Records and several other small labels. Many of Thee Shams' recordings were engineered by John Curley (of Afghan Whigs fame) at Ultrasuede Studios in Cincinnati. The band played a large role in Cincinnati's garage rock scene until they broke up in 2006.

After Thee Shams broke up, the Gabbard brothers and Sebaali went on to form the Buffalo Killers, a band with a similar but "slightly more sophisticated" sound that was "hinted at" on Thee Shams' final album, Sign the Line.

== Discography ==
- Take Off (2001) — as "The Shams"
- Please Yourself (2004)
- Sign The Line (2005)

=== Singles & EPs ===
- You Got It/Your Lovin Man (2002) — 7" vinyl only
- Thee Shams/The Greenhornes split EP (2004) — 7" vinyl only
- Out Of My Mind/Plastic Factory (2004) — 7" vinyl only
- Sings Be Coming Home & More (2004) — 7" vinyl only
- Gotta Be Something (2005) — 7" vinyl only
