= Gettin' Down On It =

Studio album by Left Lane Cruiser
- Released: July 26, 2006 rereleased February 26, 2007
- Genre: Blues rock; country blues
- Length: 56:48
- Label: Hillgrass Bluebilly

Left Lane Cruiser chronology
Gettin' Down On It (2006)	Bring Yo' Ass To The Table (2008)

Gettin' Down On It is the first full-length album by the Fort Wayne, Indiana, blues rock duo Left Lane Cruiser. The album was released through Hillgrass Bluebilly on July 26, 2006 and re-released on February 26, 2007.

== Track listing ==
No.	Title	Length
1.	"Big Mama"	3:17
2.	"Riverwalk"	4:43
3.	"That Ass (Live)"	3:05
4.	"Set Me Free"	2:55
5.	"Mountain Top"	3:01
6.	"Pork N' Beans"	3:11
7.	"Down the Road"	4:33
8.	"Truck Song"	2:39
9.	"KFD (Live)"	3:59
10.	"Shotgun Wedding"	3:38
11.	"Heart & Soul"	2:16
12.	"Cheyenne"	4:11
13.	"Ain't Got Time"	4:33
14.	"Board Shakers"	2:44
15.	"What You Want"	3:26
16.	"My Country"	4:37
Total length:		56:48
