= The Nerves =

American power pop trio (1974–1978)

- Origin: San Francisco, California, U.S.
- Genres: Power pop, proto-punk
- Years active: 1975–1978
- Labels: Alive Naturalsound; Bomp! Good Vibrations; Penniman; FGL Productions; Nerves; Third Man Records
- Past members: Jack Lee; Peter Case; Paul Collins
- Website: thenerves.com

The Nerves were an American power pop trio, formed in San Francisco in 1974 and later based in Los Angeles, featuring guitarist Jack Lee, bassist Peter Case, and drummer Paul Collins. All three members composed songs and sang. They managed an international tour in the U.S. and Canada, including dates with the Ramones, and performances for the troops as part of the United Services Organization (USO).

== Career ==
The Nerves lasted a short time from 1975 to 1978, originally forming in San Francisco before moving to Los Angeles. They self-released one self-titled four-song EP in 1976, featuring the songs "Hanging on the Telephone" (Lee), "When You Find Out" (Case), "Give Me Some Time" (Lee), and "Working Too Hard" (Collins). In addition to being the drummer, Paul Collins was also the trio's manager and did most of the bookings and promotion. The Nerves' EP was distributed by independent Bomp! Records and officially re-released on CD and vinyl by Alive Records in 2008, followed by a second release of The Breakaways, an album of post-Nerves recordings made by Collins and Case prior to the formation of Collins' group the Beat.

Despite their limited lifespan and discography, the Nerves' members and songs found later success. The group was an early part of the Los Angeles punk and pop scenes that eventually produced the Knack, the Beat and the Plimsouls. After the Nerves' break-up, Case and Collins formed the Breakaways with Pat Stengl, a group that would have an even shorter lifespan than the Nerves. Thereafter, however, Case and Collins went on to front other groups, the Plimsouls (who had a Billboard Top 100 hit with "A Million Miles Away") and the Beat, respectively. "Hanging on the Telephone" was covered by Blondie on their album Parallel Lines which reached the top 5 in the UK, and has since been covered by other groups such as L7, Def Leppard, Cat Power (whose version was featured in Cingular commercials in 2006), and Hep Alien, Lane Kim's fictional band on dramedy The Gilmore Girls. Blondie included a second Lee composition on Parallel Lines, "Will Anything Happen?" Lee also went on to write a hit for Paul Young, "Come Back and Stay".

"Hanging on the Telephone" and "When You Find Out" were later released on a 1993 Rhino Records power-pop compilation, DIY: Come Out and Play – American Power Pop I (1975–1978), which Allmusic gave a five-star review. The Nerves also appeared on the album's cover. More recently, Rhino included an unreleased Nerves track, Case's "One-Way Ticket", on the 2005 compilation Children of Nuggets: Original Artyfacts from the Second Psychedelic Era, 1976–1995, a sequel to their Nuggets: Original Artyfacts from the First Psychedelic Era, 1965-1968 compilations.

In 2008, Alive Records released One Way Ticket, a CD compilation of the remastered tracks of the Nerves' original EP, along with demos and other previously unreleased material. Following the success of The Nerves' CD reissue, Alive Records released The Breakaways, an album of post-Nerves recordings featuring Collins and Case prior to the formation of the Beat.

In 2011, the American rock band Green Day launched the American Idiot Broadway Musical Production. On any night that an original cast member left the show, they included a live rendition of the song "Walking Out on Love", which was written by Paul Collins. The song was previously recorded by the Nerves, the Breakaways and the Beat. At the end of the musical's run, the Paul Collins Beat joined Green Day on-stage for live performances in New York.

In August 2026, Third Man Records announced the October 23 release of the a "definitive anthology" of the band's work.

== Reunion tribute ==
In spring 2012, Case and Collins announced a reunion tour paying tribute to their bands the Nerves, the Breakaways, the Beat and the Plimsouls. The band line-up for the Collins and Case tour was augmented by members of the Paul Collins Beat (Timm Buechler on bass, and Amos Pitsch on drums).

The reunion was not billed as the Nerves, because Jack Lee chose not to be part of the tour. The tour included a date in Austin, Texas, where actor Bill Murray made a surprise appearance to introduce the band, as Collins' group the Beat appeared on the 1979 soundtrack of Caddyshack.

In March, the reunion tour fell apart after three weeks when Collins left. Case cited "usual musical differences" as the cause, and alleged that Collins "was continually abusive" to Case, the band, and others supporting the tour. The press release said the tour would continued with Case and band members Timm Buechler on bass and drummer Amos Pitsch. The sets would focus on the Plimsouls’ songbook.

The tour was followed by a tribute LP/cassette on Volar Records/I Hate Rock n Roll, entitled Under the Covers Vol. 2: A Tribute to Paul Collins, Peter Case, and Jack Lee, that included 18 bands, such as Grass Widow, Davila 666, Hunx and his Punx, Audacity, Tijuana Panthers, and the Mantles.

Lee had performed annually as a solo artist with his group Jack Lee Inferno prior to his death from colon cancer in May 2023.

== Discography ==
=== Albums ===
- Jack Lee, Paul Collins, Peter Case (1986), Offence Records
- Live! At the Pirate's Cove (2009), Alive Records
- The Nerves - Best Collection (2026), Third Man Records

=== EPs ===
- The Nerves (1976), independent release
- 25th Anniversary (2001), Penniman Records

=== Compilation appearances ===
- That's Totally Pop (1992), FGL Productions
- Le Génies Du Rock: West Coast Pop (1994) Editions Atlas
- One Way Ticket (2008), Alive Records
