= Junkyard Speed Ball =

Studio album by Left Lane Cruiser
- Released: March 1, 2011
- Genre: Blues rock
- Label: Alive

Professional ratings
Review scores
| Source | Rating |
|---|---|
| AllMusic | 4/5 stars |

Junkyard Speed Ball is the fourth full-length album by the Indiana rock band Left Lane Cruiser, released in 2011.

== Critical reception ==
AllMusic called the album "another fine outing from a refreshingly direct and uncomplicated band that rocks like a jackhammer." No Depression called the album "searing," writing that Left Lane Cruiser is "in its prime." Nuvo wrote that the album "runs the gamut between country-blues laments ('Hip-Hop'), hard rocking house party staples ('Weed Vodka') and psychedelic mind blowers ('Pig Farm')."

== Track listing ==
| No. | Title | Length |
|---|---|---|
| 1. | "Lost My Mind" | 3:13 |
| 2. | "Giving Tree" | 4:17 |
| 3. | "Circus" | 2:46 |
| 4. | "Shine" | 4:03 |
| 5. | "Hip-Hop" | 5:35 |
| 6. | "24 Hr" | 2:52 |
| 7. | "Weed Vodka" | 3:26 |
| 8. | "Cracker Barrel" | 3:45 |
| 9. | "Pig Farm" | 4:51 |
| 10. | "Represent" | 3:44 |
| 11. | "Road Again" | 3:01 |
| 12. | "At the Denny's" | 3:55 |
