= 3 (Buffalo Killers album) =

Studio album by Buffalo Killers
- Released: August 2, 2011
- Recorded: Candyland Recording Studio in Cincinnati, Ohio
- Genre: Blues rock
- Length: 43:56
- Label: Alive Naturalsound
- Producer: Buffalo Killers

Buffalo Killers chronology
Let It Ride (2008)	3 (2011)	Dig. Sow. Love. Grow. (2012)

Professional ratings
Review scores
Source	Rating
AllMusic	4/5 stars

3 is the third studio album by American blues rock band Buffalo Killers. It was released on August 2, 2011, on Alive Naturalsound Records. Of the first thousand vinyl copies, half were released on blue vinyl and the other half on purple.

== Critical reception ==
In a review for AllMusic, critic reviewer Mark Deming wrote: "While there isn't much here that suggests a shameless rip-off of any artist in particular, 3 conjures up a sense of time and place with ease, and the loose, sun-burnt vibe of this music, fused with Andy's fluid but forceful guitar work, Zach's simple but effective basslines, and Joey Sebaali's colorful percussion work drifts between country-rock and hard rock in a way that suggests the strengths of both without hitching itself to either."

== Track listing ==
All tracks are written by Zach Gabbard and Andy Gabbard.

3 track listing
No.	Title	Length
1.	"Huma Bird"	4:55
2.	"Circle Da"	3:11
3.	"Mountain Sally"	3:56
4.	"Spend My Last Breath"	3:37
5.	"Lily of the Valley"	3:03
6.	"Jon Jacob"	3:13
7.	"All Turn to Cloud"	3:31
8.	"Take Your Place"	2:50
9.	"Time Was Shaping"	3:21
10.	"Move On"	3:22
11.	"Everyone Knows It but You"	3:00
12.	"Could Never Be"	5:56

== Personnel ==
Band members

- Zach Gabbard – bass guitar, vocals
- Andy Gabbard – guitar, vocals
- Joey Sebaali – drums

Additional musicians

- Kelley Deal – vocals on "Could Never Be"
- Sven Kahns – lap steel
- James Leg – keyboards on "Circle Day" and "Could Never Be"
- Brian Olive – saxophone
- Ryan Wells – banjo

Production

- Buffalo Killers – production
- Mike Montgomery – recording and mixing
- Joshua Marc Levy – art direction, design and illustration
