= Let It Ride (Buffalo Killers album) =

Studio album by Buffalo Killers
- Released: July 22, 2008
- Recorded: Akron Analog in Akron, Ohio
- Genre: Blues rock
- Length: 44:00
- Label: Alive Naturalsound
- Producer: Dan Auerbach

Buffalo Killers chronology
Buffalo Killers (2006)	Let It Ride (2008)	3 (2011)

Professional ratings
Review scores
Source	Rating
Allmusic	2.5/5 stars

Let It Ride is the second studio album by American blues rock band Buffalo Killers. It was produced by Dan Auerbach of The Black Keys and released in July 2008 on Alive Naturalsound Records. The first pressing of vinyl copies included a bonus live CD sourced from a fan's bootleg recording.

== Track listing ==
All songs composed and arranged by Zachary Gabbard and Andrew Gabbard.

1. "Get Together Now Today" – 4:43
2. "Let It Ride" – 4:04
3. "Leave the Sun Behind" – 4:51
4. "If I Get Myself Anywhere" – 4:42
5. "Give and Give" – 3:34
6. "On the Prowl" – 2:56
7. "It's a Shame" – 5:46
8. "Heart in Your Hand" – 5:23
9. "Take Me Back Home" – 3:53
10. "Black Paper" – 4:08

== Personnel ==
Buffalo Killers

- Zachary Gabbard – bass guitar, vocals
- Andrew Gabbard – guitar, vocals
- Joseph Sebaali – drums

Production

- Dan Auerbach – recording and production
- Bob Cesare – assistant engineer
- Andrew Hamilton – mastering
- Evil Wren – cover concept and design
