= Alive As Fuck =

Studio album by Black Diamond Heavies
- Released: November 2009
- Genre: Blues rock
- Label: Alive

Alive As Fuck was released in 2009. It is the first live album by the Nashville, TN rock band, Black Diamond Heavies. This album was recorded during their show at the Masonic Lodge, in Covington, KY and was released under the Alive Records label.

== Track listing ==
No.	Title	Length
1.	"Take A Ride"	4:57
2.	"Hambone"	5:26
3.	"Might Be Right"	4:49
4.	"Bidin' My Time"	5:26
5.	"White Bitch"	4:24
6.	"Lose Yourself"	3:48
7.	"Happy Hour"	4:53
8.	"Leave It In The Road"	3:18
9.	"Fever In My Blood"	6:06
