= Brain Cycles =

Studio album by Radio Moscow
- Released: April 14, 2009
- Recorded: Sound Farm, Jamaica, Iowa
- Genre: Psychedelic rock, blues rock, garage rock
- Length: 44:25
- Label: Alive Naturalsound
- Producer: Radio Moscow

Radio Moscow chronology
Radio Moscow (2007)	Brain Cycles (2009)	The Great Escape of Leslie Magnafuzz (2011)

Alternative cover
- LP edition cover

Brain Cycles is the second studio album by American psychedelic rock band Radio Moscow. Released on April 14, 2009, it was the band's first album to feature bassist Zach Anderson, who replaced Luke McDuff in 2007. Issued by Alive Naturalsound, it was recorded at Sound Farm in Jamaica, Iowa and produced by band members Parker Griggs and Anderson.

== Composition and recording ==
In an interview with The A.V. Club, frontman Griggs explained that "The first album Radio Moscow was written all-instrumental, and the singing was just sort of [an afterthought] ... This album was written more with the vocals in mind." On the subject of self-producing the album, Griggs noted that "I wanted to use the tape again and try to get an old-school sound ... [and] this time around I just tried to give it my all and be more comfortable with that." The frontman also noted that "We recorded this [album] at Sound Farm in Jamaica, [Iowa] instead of Ohio this time. We put a lot more time into it and really focused on the mix to give it a kind of classic psychedelic feel. It's still real bluesy but we tried to make it more psychedelic than the last one."

== Style and reception ==
In a press release for the album, Radio Moscow compared Brain Cycles to such psychedelic artists as Randy Holden (of Blue Cheer), The Groundhogs, Peter Green (of Fleetwood Mac) and the Flower Travellin' Band. Writing for music website AllMusic, critic Mark Deming proposed that "Radio Moscow's second album strongly establishes its stoner credentials even before you've given it a listen, and the music doesn't disappoint if you're hoping for a gloriously resinous musical experience." Deming compares Brain Cycles to psychedelic blues-rock of the 1960s and 1970s, suggesting similarities to the bands Cream and Blue Cheer and noting the latter's album Outsideinside as possible inspiration for the record.

Deming's AllMusic review is generally positive, although he does conclude that "Brain Cycles is undercut by songs that aren't as impressive as the band playing them; for every number like the hard boogieing "City Lights" and the frantic wail of "Just Don't Know," there's another that sounds like a tune you'd skip over to get to one of the really good cuts ... They just don't make records like Brain Cycles anymore, and while most of the album suggests that's too bad, a few cuts demonstrate why folks stopped doing this back in the day." The album has received praise for frontman Griggs's vocal work, the added cohesiveness of the rhythm section, and the more sophisticated songwriting. Many critics have also noted that Brain Cycles is an improvement on the band's debut album Radio Moscow.

== Track listing ==
All tracks are written by Parker Griggs; "No Jane" co-written by Zach Anderson.

No.	Title	Length
1.	"I Just Don't Know"	5:00
2.	"Broke Down"	4:15
3.	"The Escape"	4:00
4.	"No Good Woman"	8:13
5.	"Brain Cycles" (instrumental)	3:23
6.	"250 Miles"	4:52
7.	"Hold on Me"	3:20
8.	"Black Boot" (instrumental)	2:04
9.	"City Lights"	3:58
10.	"No Jane"	5:20
Total length:		44:25

== Personnel ==
Radio Moscow

- Parker Griggs – vocals, guitar, drums, percussion, production
- Zach Anderson – bass, production

Additional personnel

- Justin "Blind Beard" Apple – organ on tracks 2 and 5
- Matt Sepanic – recording
- Doug Van Sloun – mastering

Graphic personnel

- Anthony Yankovic – artwork
- Patrick Boissel – artwork layout
- Allison Cobb – photography
- Bre Sabatino – photography
- Dario Cantatore – photography
