= Gyasi =

Gyasi is both a surname and given name popular in Ghana. Notable people with this name include:

== Given name ==
- Gyasi Ross, American author, attorney, rapper, speaker and storyteller
- Gyasi Zardes (born 1991), American association football player

== Surname ==
- Barbara Oteng Gyasi (born 1964), Ghanaian politician and Deputy
- Daniel Gyasi (born 1994), Ghanaian sprinter
- David Gyasi, British actor
- Dr. K Gyasi (1929 - 2012), Ghanaian musician
- Edwin Gyasi (born 1991), Dutch footballer
- Emanuel Quartsin Gyasi (born 1994), Ghanaian-Italian football player
- Jeff Gyasi (born 1989), Nigerian footballer
- Kwaku Gyasi, Ghanaian gospel singer
- Raymond Gyasi (born 1994), Ghanaian football winger
- Yaa Gyasi (born 1989), Ghanaian-American novelist
- Prince Gyasi Nyantakyi (born 1995), Ghanaian international visual artist
