= Trainwreck Riders =

American alt-country band

- Origin: San Francisco, California
- Genres: Alternative country, cowpunk
- Years active: 2000–present
- Labels: Alive Records
- Members: Steve Kerwin; Andrew Kerwin; Pete Frauenfelder; Shawn "Boof" Wyman
- Past members: Morgan Stickrod; Forrest Lawrence; Chris Lawrence; Garrett Heater; Tony Molina

Trainwreck Riders is an American four piece alt-country band from San Francisco, California. The band's releases include Where The Neon Turns To Wood (2002), Lonely Road Revival (2006), The Perch (2009), Ghost Yards (2012), and Trainwreck Riders (2019).
