= Buffalo Killers (album) =

Studio album by Buffalo Killers
- Released: October 10, 2006
- Recorded: Ultrasuede Studios in Cincinnati, Ohio
- Genre: Blues rock
- Length: 47:08
- Label: Alive Naturalsound
- Producer: John Curley

Buffalo Killers chronology
Buffalo Killers (2006)	Let It Ride (2008)

Professional ratings
Review scores
Source	Rating
Allmusic	4.5/5 stars

Buffalo Killers is the debut studio album by American blues rock band Buffalo Killers. It was released in October 2006 on Alive Naturalsound Records as a Compact Disc and a limited edition LP with yellow, swirled vinyl.

== Track listing ==
All songs composed and arranged by Andrew Gabbard and Zachary Gabbard.

1. "San Martine des Morelle" – 4:25
2. "SS Nowhere" – 4:06
3. "Heavens You Are" – 6:43
4. "The Path Before Me" – 3:30
5. "River Water" – 4:04
6. "With Love" – 5:31
7. "Children of War" – 4:32
8. "Down in the Blue" – 3:43
9. "Fit to Breathe" – 6:07
10. "Something Real" – 4:27

== Personnel ==
Buffalo Killers

- Andrew Gabbard – guitar, vocals, piano
- Zachary Gabbard – bass guitar, vocals, guitar
- Joseph Sebaali – drums, piano, harpsichord

Additional personnel

- John Curley – bass guitar on "SS Nowhere" and "Children of War"

Production

- John Curley – recording and production
- Dave Schultz – mastering
- Erin Volk – artwork
- Shawn Abnoxious – photography
