= The Great Escape of Leslie Magnafuzz =

Studio album by Radio Moscow
- Released: October 11, 2011
- Recorded: Prairie Sun Recording Studios, Cotati, California
- Genre: Psychedelic rock, blues rock, garage rock
- Length: 50:26
- Label: Alive Naturalsound
- Producer: Parker Griggs

Radio Moscow chronology
Brain Cycles (2009)	The Great Escape of Leslie Magnafuzz (2011)	3 & 3 Quarters (2012)

The Great Escape of Leslie Magnafuzz is the third studio album by American psychedelic rock band Radio Moscow. Released on October 11, 2011, it was recorded, mixed and mastered at California's Prairie Sun Recording Studios, produced by frontman Parker Griggs.

== Reception ==
Professional ratings
Review scores
Source	Rating
AllMusic	3.5/5 stars
Classic Rock	4/5 stars
PopMatters	4/10 stars

A reviewer identified as the Barman from i94bar.com describes Radio Moscow as "an old-style power trio with an overload of psychedelic headspace, structured around guitarist Parker Griggs whose exemplary six-string work carves sonic holes." He goes on to describe "The Great Escape of Lesilie Magnafuzz" as an album filled to the brim with "spiraling guitar lines and warm yet slightly disembodied Griggs vocals run through bubbling bass-lines and drumming that's all over the kit but firmly anchored to the floor." While wrapping up his review, the Barman commends Radio Moscow for tapping into "a motherlode of bluesy, heavy but nimble psych", adding that it's "no wonder they've enjoyed the patronage of The Black Keys."

== Track listing ==
All tracks are written by Parker Griggs; "Little Eyes" and "Summer of 1942" co-written by Zach Anderson.

No.	Title	Length
1.	"Little Eyes"	4:46
2.	"No Time"	3:47
3.	"Speed Freak"	3:14
4.	"Creepin'"	3:28
5.	"Turtle Back Rider"	4:19
6.	"Densaflorativa"	3:31
7.	"I Don't Need Nobody"	4:55
8.	"Misleading Me"	3:54
9.	"Summer of 1942"	2:59
10.	"Insideout"	5:12
11.	"Deep Down Below"	5:06
12.	"Open Your Eyes"	5:24

== Personnel ==
=== Radio Moscow ===
- Parker Griggs – vocals, guitars, drums, percussion, harmonica, production, mixing, illustrations
- Zach Anderson – bass

=== Additional personnel ===
- Jason D'Ottavio – engineering, mixing
- Tim Gennert – mastering
- Allison Cobb – artwork
- Geoff Crowe – layout
