= Every Damn Time =

Studio album by Black Diamond Heavies
- Released: January 2007
- Genre: Blues rock
- Length: 39:55
- Label: Alive

Every Damn Time is the first studio album by the Nashville, TN rock band, Black Diamond Heavies. It was released in 2007 under the Alive Records Label. This is Black Diamond Heavies first album as a two-man band after Mark "Porkchop" Holder left the group in 2006, after their self-released 2004 EP You Damn Right.

== Track listing ==
No.	Title	Length
1.	"Fever In My Blood"	5:29
2.	"All To Hell"	8:01
3.	"Leave It In the Road"	3:32
4.	"Let Me Coco"	0:54
5.	"Poor Brown Sugar"	3:04
6.	"Stitched in Sin"	3:35
7.	"White Bitch"	3:56
8.	"Signs"	3:49
9.	"Might Be Right"	4:31
10.	"Guess You Gone And Fucked It All Up"	3:04
