= Bring Yo' Ass to the Table =

Bring Yo' Ass To The Table

Studio album by Left Lane Cruiser
- Released: January 2008
- Genre: Blues rock
- Label: Alive

Left Lane Cruiser chronology
Gettin' Down On It (2006)	Bring Yo' Ass To The Table (2008)	All You Can Eat (2009)

Professional ratings
Review scores
Source	Rating
AllMusic	4.5/5 stars
Drowned in Sound	3/10

Bring Yo' Ass To The Table is the second full-length album by the Indiana rock band Left Lane Cruiser, their first under the Alive Records label.

== Critical reception ==
AllMusic called the album "stunning," writing that "this is the blues in their purest form, rough and ragged, rubbed raw by too much hard living and too many tough breaks." Exclaim! wrote that the duo "certainly sound ready to compete with peers like the Black Keys ... [they] actually possess enough chops to write some memorable songs." The Star Tribune wrote that "the lo-fi, hard punk-blues sound is raw, gritty and often ferocious, thanks to singer Joe Evans' aggressive slide guitar and Brenn Beck's minimalist percussion."

== Track listing ==
No.	Title	Length
1.	"Wash It"	3:16
2.	"Set Me Down"	3:01
3.	"Pork N' Beans"	2:54
4.	"KFD"	4:07
5.	"Justify"	3:21
6.	"G Bob"	3:02
7.	"Big Momma"	3:12
8.	"Busket"	3:19
9.	"Amerika"	3:04
10.	"Amy's In The Kitchen"	3:28
11.	"Mr. Johnson"	3:36
12.	"Heavy"	4:31

== Personnel ==
- Brenn Beck - drums
- Joe Evans - guitar
