= RF7 =

RF7 is an American, long-lived, southern California punk rock band, that began in 1979 by Felix Alanis and small-time child star of the Sheriff John show Nick Lamagna. Felix also began the record label Smoke Seven Records and signed his band and many others who were ignored by the big labels then, such as Redd Kross, Bad Religion, JFA, Crank Shaft, Circle One, SIN 34, Youth Gone Mad, etc.

From the beginning, the RF7 sound was not clearly punk but really what would be called today hardcore punk. Felix Alanis has always mixed middle class virtues with strange religious imagery in his lyrics. Nick Lamagna added guitar and music that had a twist more "rock" than some punks preferred. Walt Phelan added a drummer's drumming, and the bass player seemed to always change, with Robert Armstrong perhaps being the most solid recorded bass man from 1980–83, and again on 1990s classic Traditional Values album. On 1982's Fall In album, the band brought in the record producer, Geza X.

The band continues today with their 2004 release, Addictions and Heartaches, on the Puke and Vomit label, which also re-released the compilation albums Public Service and Sudden Death compilation. Their early releases are available on the Grand Theft Audio label, as well as Bomp and Alive records.

== Discography ==
=== Studio albums ===
- 1979 – Acts of Defiance
- 1981 – Weight of the World
- 1982 – Fall In (EP)
- 1983 – Submit to Them Freely (EP)
- 1987 – RF7 87
- 1989 – Traditional Values
- 1994 – Satan VS The Working Man
- 1997 – God Forbid
- 2004 – Addictions and Heart Aches
- 2007 – Left for Dead (45)
- 2009 – Hatred on the Rise
- 2011 – God Forbid
- 2014 – 101
- 2017 – Day at the Crisis

=== Compilation albums ===
- 1981 – Public Service
- 1982 – Lung Cookies
- 19?? – Sudden Death
- 1995 – Buried Alive / Smoke 7 Records 81-83 (Bomp Records #BCD 4052)
- 1996 – Buried Alive 2] (Bomp Records #BCD 4058)

== Band members 1979 - 2009 ==
- Felix Alanis, Vocals
- Nick Lamagna, Guitars
- Joe Rowan, Bass Guitar
- Robert Armstrong, Bass,
- Gnat, Bass
- Mike Smith, Bass
- Kiley Asato, Bass
- Xavier Chavez, Bass
- Walt Phelan, Drums
- Big Mike, Drums
- Jerry Fehlman, Drums
- Steve Drojensky (Dorant), Auxiliary Guitar(Fall In/Submit to Them Freely)
- Tony Calderone, Guitar
