= T-Model Ford =

American blues musician (1923–2013)

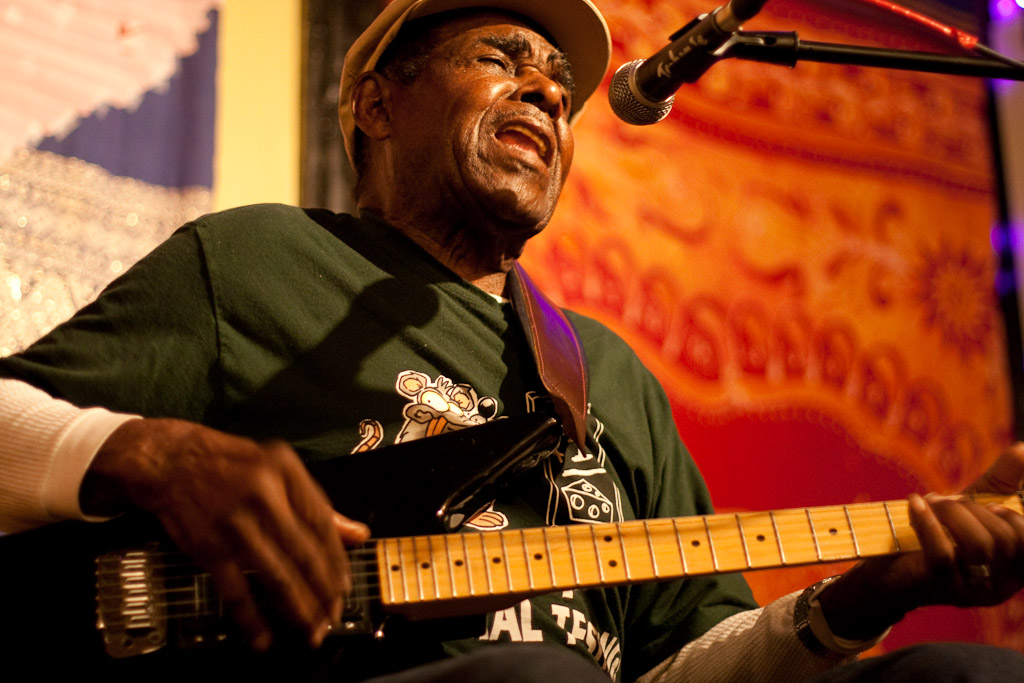
- T-Model Ford at Tea Bazaar in Charlottesville, Virginia, on March 1, 2010

Background information
- Born: James Lewis Carter Ford; June 24, 1923 (probable); Forest, Mississippi, United States
- Died: July 16, 2013 (aged 90) Greenville, Mississippi, United States
- Genre: Blues
- Occupations: Musician, singer
- Instruments: Guitar, vocals
- Years active: 1997–2013
- Labels: Fat Possum, Alive Naturalsound
- Formerly of: Gravelroad

James Lewis Carter Ford (June 24, 1923 – July 16, 2013) was an American blues musician who performed under the name T-Model Ford. He began his musical career in his early seventies and continuously recorded for the Fat Possum record label before eventually moving to Alive Naturalsound Records. His musical style combined the rawness of Delta blues with Chicago and juke joint blues styles.

== Biography ==
Ford was born in Forest, Mississippi, sometime between 1921 and 1925. Although some researchers claim that Ford was born on June 24, 1923, at the time of his death his record company gave his age as 94, suggesting that he was born in either 1918 or 1919. Conversely, Ford's passport stated that his date of birth as June 24, 1921, while his Mississippi driver's license read that he was born on June 27, 1924.

Ford's father was an abusive figure and severely injured his son at age eleven. Ford claims that he survived a succession of violent home environments, towards which he later expressed his indifference.

Ford, who was illiterate, began working various blue collar jobs before he was a teenager, which included plowing fields and working in a sawmill. He was later employed as a foreman at a lumber company before becoming a truck driver. Around this time, Ford was sentenced to ten years imprisonment for murder and served on a chain gang. By some accounts, Ford was able to reduce his sentence to only two years. Following his release, Ford reportedly had several other run-ins with law enforcement.

Later, Ford lived in Greenville, Mississippi, and for a period wrote an advice column for Arthur magazine. He is thought to have fathered at least twenty-six children.

According to the music critic Will Hodgkinson, who met and interviewed Ford for his book Guitar Man, Ford took up the guitar when his fifth wife left him and gave him the instrument as a farewell present. Ford taught himself how to play without being able to read sheet music or guitar tabs. Hodgkinson observed that Ford could not explain his technique: he had simply worked out a way of playing that sounded like the guitarists he admired, including Muddy Waters and Howlin' Wolf.

Ford toured juke joints and other venues and for a while opened for Buddy Guy. In 1995, he was discovered by Matthew Johnson of Fat Possum Records, through whose label he would release five albums between 1997 and 2008.

In 1997, Ford was featured in the documentary Juke, directed by Mary Flannery, appearing alongside his fellow musicians Farmer John and John Horton. After 2008, Ford largely performed with the Seattle-based band GravelRoad. Their collaboration was originally intended as a one-off event with Ford looking for backing musicians at the Deep Blues Festival in Minnesota. GravelRoad, who were longtime fans of Ford, subsequently supported Ford on a ten-show tour.

Ford had a pacemaker inserted at the end of 2008, but appeared on stage again with GravelRoad in both 2009 and 2010, after which Ford suffered a stroke. Despite experiencing difficulty with the mobility of his right hand, Ford played several more shows with GravelRoad that year, culminating with an appearance at the Pickathon Festival. Ford and GravelRoad later opened the third day of the All Tomorrow's Parties Festival held in New York over Labor Day weekend in 2010, curated by American independent filmmaker Jim Jarmusch.

GravelRoad backed Ford on his 2010 and 2011 albums, The Ladies Man and Taledragger, both of which were released on Alive Naturalsound Records. Ford eventually suffered a second stroke in the summer of 2012 that severely limited his public appearances. Despite his declining health, Ford performed at that year's King Biscuit Blues Festival in October.

On July 16, 2013, Fat Possum announced that Ford had died at home in Greenville due to respiratory failure after a prolonged illness. The Mount Zion Memorial Fund organized the placement of a headstone for Ford at Green Lawn Memorial Gardens Cemetery, near Greenville. The ceremony was on May 31, 2014. Ford's gravestone was designed by Amos Harvey and engraved by Alan Orlicek.

== Discography ==
- Pee-Wee Get My Gun - 1997 (Fat Possum)
- You Better Keep Still - 1999 (Fat Possum)
- She Ain't None of Your'n - 2000 (Fat Possum)
- Bad Man - 2002 (Fat Possum)
- Don't Get Out Talkin' It - 2008 (Fat Possum)
- Jack Daniel Time - 2008 (Mudpuppy)
- The Ladies Man - 2010 (Alive Naturalsound)
- Taledragger - 2011 (Alive Naturalsound)
- I Was Born In A Swamp - 2021 (Alive Naturalsound)
