= A Touch of Someone Else's Class =

Studio album by Black Diamond Heavies
- Released: June 2008
- Genre: Blues rock
- Label: Alive
- Producer: Dan Auerbach

A Touch of Someone Else's Class is the second studio album, under the Alive Records label, by the Nashville, TN rock band, Black Diamond Heavies. Dan Auerbach of The Black Keys produced this album while it was recorded at his Akron Analog Studio. Also, for the song "Bidin’ My Time", Black Diamond Heavies were joined by Black Keys drummer, Patrick Carney.

== Track listing ==
| No. | Title | Length |
|---|---|---|
| 1. | "Nutbush City Limits" | 3:01 |
| 2. | "Everything is Everything" | 3:52 |
| 3. | "Numbers 22" | 2:55 |
| 4. | "Bidin' My Time" | 5:17 |
| 5. | "Take A Ride" | 4:41 |
| 6. | "Solid Gold" | 2:36 |
| 7. | "Smoothe It Out" | 2:58 |
| 8. | "Make Love Time" | 3:31 |
| 9. | "Oh, Sinnerman" | 4:26 |
| 10. | "Loose Yourself" | 3:42 |
| 11. | "Happy Hour" | 3:25 |
