= The Killigans =

American Punk-Folk Band

The Killigans are an American punk-folk band from Lincoln, Nebraska. Formed in 2004 following a restructuring of the former local Nebraska ska-punk band Settle for Less, they play a mix of punk, rock, folk, Americana, country, Celtic and Eastern European inspired music. Their song "Lessons from the Empty Glass" was featured in the 2010 Ridley Scott film Robin Hood. They have released 5 full-length albums, 2 EPs, and are well known for their rendition of University of Nebraska's football team's fight song "Come a Runnin Boys/The Cornhusker" which is played in Memorial Stadium.
