= Left Lane Cruiser =

American blues rock band

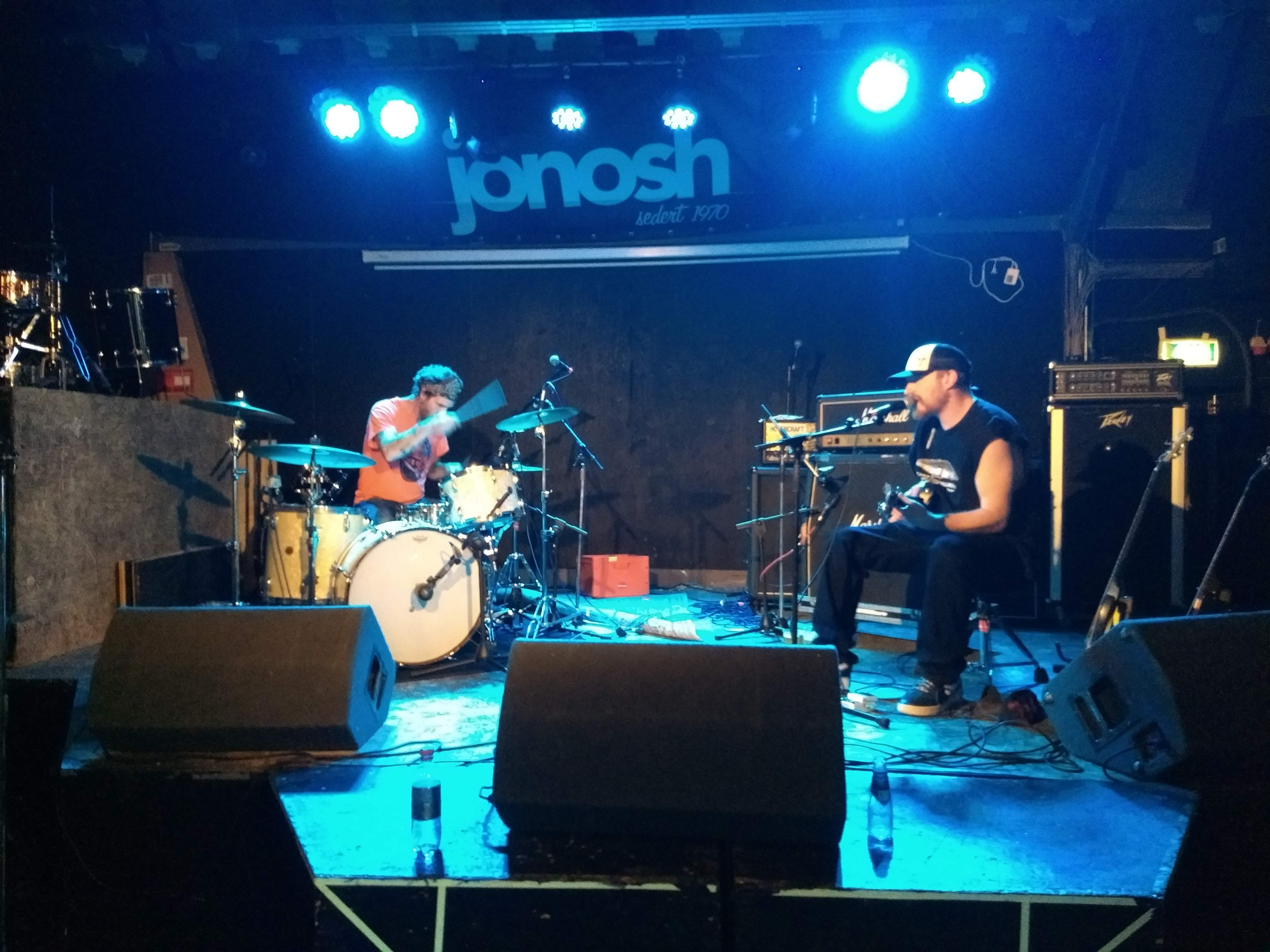
- 2019 - Jonosh

Background information
- Origin: Fort Wayne, Indiana
- Genres: Blues rock, rockabilly, punk blues
- Years active: 2004–present
- Labels: Alive; Hillgrass Bluebilly
- Members: Joe Evans IV; Brenn Beck
- Past members: Pete Dio; Jessie Garet; Joe Bent
- Website: facebook.com/leftlanecruiserband

Left Lane Cruiser is an American blues rock band from Fort Wayne, Indiana. The band comprises Fredrick "Joe" Evans IV on slide guitar and vocals with Brenn Beck on drums and back up vocals.

The band said that their main influence comes from the North Mississippi Hill country blues musicians, most of whom were or are currently signed to Fat Possum Records.

== History ==
In July 2007, Left Lane Cruiser was signed to Alive Records. Their first nationally released album, Bring Yo' Ass to the Table, was released on January 8, 2008.

In September 2008, Left Lane Cruiser embarked on their first European Tour. The first few shows were cancelled due to issues with passports when arriving in the UK, forcing the two members to return to the United States for several days. Problems with passports were then resolved and Left Lane Cruiser resumed the tour.

Their third album, All You Can Eat, was released on Alive Records, September 15, 2009. The song "Waynedale" from the All You Can Eat album was used on episode 8 of season 3 of the television series Breaking Bad.

The band released its fourth album on March 1, 2011, on Alive Records, some of which was recorded with John Wesley Myers, the keyboard player for the Black Diamond Heavies, also signed to Alive Records.

== Discography ==
=== Studio albums ===
Year	Title	Label	Notes
2006	Gettin' Down On It	Hillgrass Bluebilly Records	Re-released 2009
2008	Bring Yo' Ass to the Table	Alive Records	January 8, 2008
2009	All You Can Eat	Alive Records	September 15, 2009
2011	Junkyard Speed Ball	Alive Records	March 1, 2011
2012	Painkillers	Alive Records	June 26, 2012, With Reverend James Leg
2013	Rock Them Back To Hell!	Alive Records	September 17, 2013
2014	Slingshot	Hillgrass Bluebilly Records	April 8, 2014
2015	Dirty Spliff Blues	Alive Records	June 15, 2015
2016	Beck In Black	Alive Records	July 8, 2016
2017	Claw Machine Wizard	Alive Records	May 19, 2017
2019	Shake and Bake	Alive Records	May 31, 2019
2024	Bayport BBQ Blues	Alive Records	June 7, 2024

== Members ==
- Joe Evans IV
- Brenn Beck
