= Radio Moscow (album) =

Studio album by Radio Moscow
- Released: February 27, 2007
- Recorded: July 2006 in Akron, Ohio
- Genre: Psychedelic rock, blues rock, garage rock
- Length: 36:50
- Label: Alive Naturalsound
- Producer: Dan Auerbach

Radio Moscow chronology
| Radio Moscow (2007) | Brain Cycles (2009) |

Radio Moscow is the self-titled debut album by American psychedelic rock band Radio Moscow. Recorded in Akron, Ohio in July 2006, the album was produced by Dan Auerbach and released by Alive Naturalsound Records on February 27, 2007.

== Reception ==
Professional ratings
Review scores
| Source | Rating |
|---|---|
| Allmusic | 3.5/5 stars |

Reviewing Radio Moscow for music website AllMusic, Greg Prato awarded the album three and a half out of five stars, comparing the band to a number of artists from the 1970s, including Ram Jam ("Luckydutch"), The Allman Brothers Band ("Lickskillet") and The Jeff Beck Group ("Mistreating Queen" and "Whatever Happened").

== Track listing ==
All tracks are written by Parker Griggs, except where noted.

| No. | Title | Length |
|---|---|---|
| 1. | "Introduction" (Griggs, Dan Auerbach) | 1:19 |
| 2. | "Frustrating Sound" | 3:54 |
| 3. | "Luckydutch" | 4:40 |
| 4. | "Lickskillet" | 4:55 |
| 5. | "Mistreating Queen" | 4:32 |
| 6. | "Whatever Happened" | 3:20 |
| 7. | "Timebomb" (Griggs, Auerbach) | 3:17 |
| 8. | "Deep Blue Sea" | 5:39 |
| 9. | "Ordovician Fauna" | 2:01 |
| 10. | "Fuse" | 3:13 |
| Total length: | | 36:50 |

== Personnel ==
Radio Moscow

- Parker Griggs – vocals, guitars, drums, percussion
- Luke McDuff – bass

Additional personnel

- Dan Auerbach – production, engineering, slide guitar (track 8)
- Chris Keffer – mastering
- Anthony Yankovic – artwork
