= Buffalo Killers =

American rock band

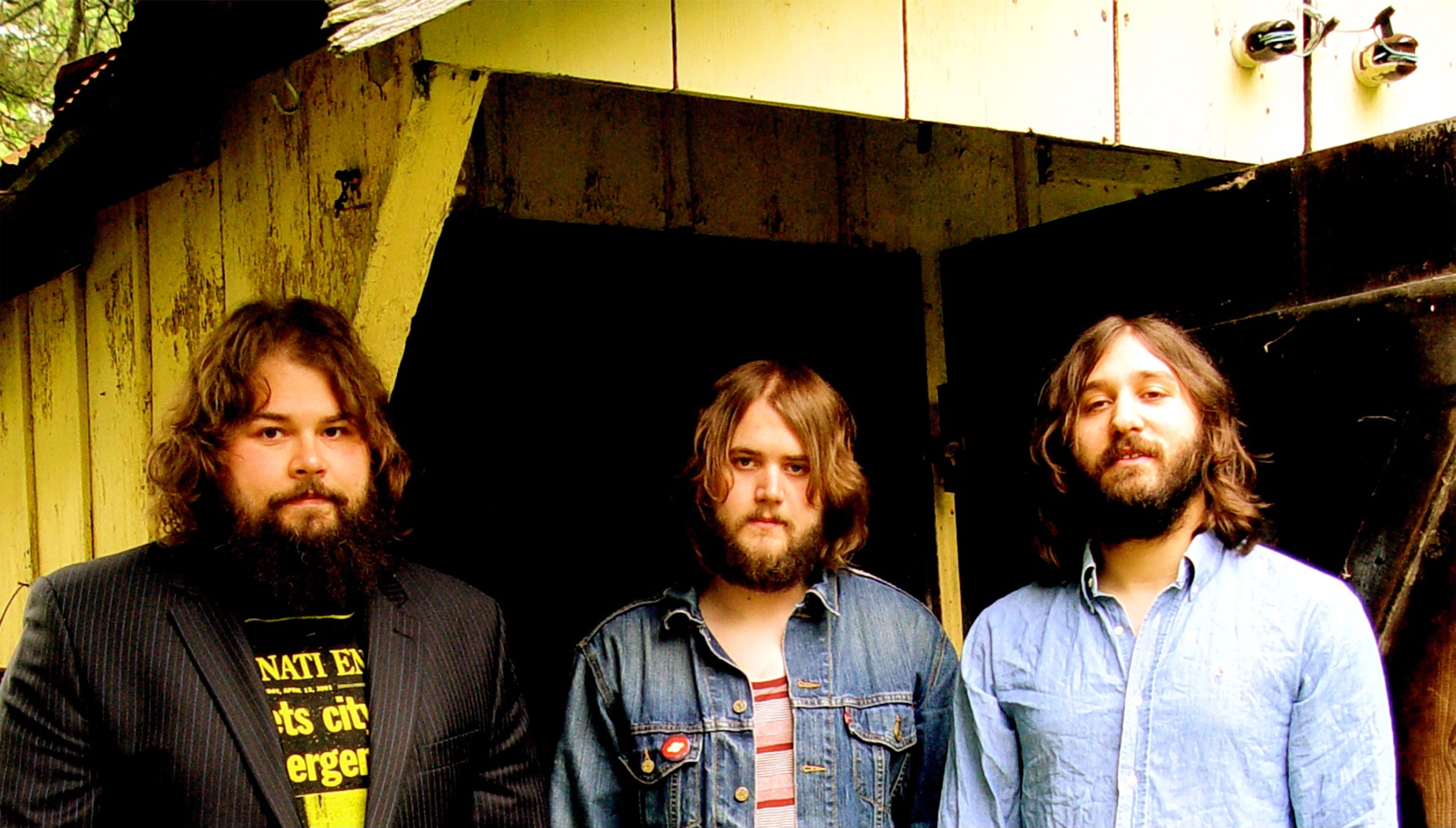
- Zachary Gabbard, Andrew Gabbard and Joseph Sebaali of Buffalo Killers in 2011

Background information
- Origin: Cincinnati, Ohio
- Genres: Hard rock, blues rock, psychedelic rock
- Years active: 2006–present
- Labels: Alive
- Members: Andrew Gabbard; Zachary Gabbard; Joseph Sebaali; Sven Kahns
- Website: buffalokillers.com

Buffalo Killers are an American rock band comprising guitarist and vocalist Andrew Gabbard, bass guitarist and vocalist Zachary Gabbard and drummer Joseph Sebaali. The band was formed in Cincinnati, Ohio, in 2006 following the dissolution of Thee Shams, of which the trio were members. Buffalo Killers were quickly signed by Alive Records and their self-titled debut album was released in October 2006; Buffalo Killers drew the attention of Chris Robinson, who invited the band to open a string of dates for The Black Crowes in 2007. Buffalo Killers' second album, Let It Ride, was produced by Dan Auerbach of The Black Keys and released in July 2008.

== History ==
=== Early years and formation ===
Andrew and Zachary Gabbard grew up in a musical household with a guitar-playing father, who taught them to play the instrument at an early age. Zach recalls growing up "listening to Neil Young, The Grateful Dead, CSNY and New Riders of the Purple Sage from as long back as I can remember." With access to their father's record collection and musical instruments, Zach says he and his brother were "groomed" to make a career of playing music. Zach formed the garage rock band Thee Shams in 1999; the five-piece band included the other two future members of Buffalo Killers. Thee Shams released four albums on four record labels before the Gabbard brothers broke up the band in late 2005. "In the end it was broke and the road only made it worse", said Zach, adding, "It was best to move on, take a break and re-evaluate the situation". In early 2006, the Gabbard brothers recruited Sebaali to play drums (he had played keyboards in Thee Shams) and formed Buffalo Killers. The new band's sound was a "more polished version" of Thee Shams' minimalist garage rock, but "still rooted in that great sweaty and swampy blues-rock inspired by '60s garage rock psychedelia", wrote Rick Bird of The Cincinnati Post. Other reviewers compared the band to Blue Cheer, Mountain and The Rolling Stones.

=== Buffalo Killers–present ===
It was a big fucking deal to me when The Black Crowes asked us to go on the road with them. I grew up listening to them. For us, it was like touring with The Beatles.

— Zachary Gabbard

Shortly after the band's formation, Buffalo Killers began gigging throughout Ohio and recorded a five-song demo with producer John Curley. Though the band intended to release the demo independently, Zach sent copies to record labels on a lark. Less than a week later the band received a call from Alive Records; the label "liked the recordings so much that they wanted to release them as they were", according to Zach. Alive Records subsequently signed Buffalo Killers, who scrambled to write and record five more songs to flesh out an LP. The album, Buffalo Killers, was released on October 10, 2006. Chris Robinson heard the album and invited the band to open a string of dates for The Black Crowes in 2007. Buffalo Killers had just finished booking their own tour, but then their booking agent "started calling me back frantically" recalled Zach. "He said that The Crowes had called and invited us on the whole fall tour. I was like, 'Well, cancel all that other shit.'"

While on tour with The Black Crowes, Buffalo Killers wrote half of what would become Let It Ride. The band entered the studio, with Black Keys guitarist/vocalist Dan Auerbach serving as producer, immediately following the tour. The recording session took "only a few days", according to Auerbach, who downplayed his role in making the album. "These are the kind of guys that don't need a lot of help when it comes to making records or sparking their imagination." Auerbach felt his most important contribution was in capturing "the raw live sound of this band". A concert tour, on which Buffalo Killers opened for The Black Keys, preceded the July 22, 2008, release of Let It Ride. A bonus live CD, sourced from a fan's bootleg, was included in a limited edition vinyl pressing of the album. The inclusion was made (even though the bootleg "sounds like shit", said Zach) to show that the band can play live and is not studio-enhanced. Another tour opening for The Black Crowes followed in November.

Dig. Sow. Love. Grow. was released in August 2012.

In 2014, Buffalo Killers added a fourth member, Sven Kahns, on guitar and lap steel.

In August 2019, it was announced that Zachary and Andrew Gabbard had joined The Black Keys' touring band on bass and guitar, respectively. The announcement was made after Rolling Stone published an exclusive rehearsal video showing the Gabbard brothers performing the song "Go" from the Keys' ninth studio album, Let's Rock. The band's first show featuring this new lineup was on September 19, 2019 at the Wiltern Theater in Los Angeles.

== Discography ==
- Buffalo Killers (2006)
- Let It Ride (2008)
- 3 (2011)
- Dig. Sow. Love. Grow. (2012)
- Ohio Grass (Record Store Day 2013)
- Heavy Reverie (2014)
- Fireball of Sulk (EP+LP 2014)
- Alive and Well in Ohio (2017)

== Members ==
- Andrew Gabbard – guitar and vocals
- Zachary Gabbard – bass guitar and vocals
- Joseph Sebaali – drums
- Sven Kahns – guitar and lap steel
