= 3 & 3 Quarters =

Compilation album by Radio Moscow
- Released: April 17, 2012
- Recorded: 2003
- Genre: Psychedelic rock, blues rock, garage rock, hard rock
- Length: 32:24
- Label: Alive Naturalsound
- Producer: Parker Griggs

Radio Moscow chronology
The Great Escape of Leslie Magnafuzz (2011)	3 & 3 Quarters (2012)	Magical Dirt (2014)

Professional ratings
Review scores
Source	Rating
AllMusic	3/5 stars

3 & 3 Quarters is a compilation album by American psychedelic rock band Radio Moscow. Released on April 17, 2012, it was recorded and produced in 2003 by frontman Parker Griggs before the formation of the band when he called himself Garbage Composal.

== Track listing ==
All tracks are written by Parker Griggs.

No.	Title	Length
1.	"You're Doing It to Me"	2:42
2.	"The Look on My Face"	2:34
3.	"Here I Come"	3:10
4.	"No, No, Mister!!"	3:11
5.	"We're All Troubled"	2:36
6.	"She's Mine"	2:35
7.	"About to Crash"	2:22
8.	"The Stomp!"	2:21
9.	"On Your Own"	3:30
10.	"Confusion"	1:59
11.	"Dog Show"	2:00
12.	"Time Bomb (Middle the Room)"	3:24
Total length:		32:24

== Personnel ==
- Parker Griggs – vocals, guitar, bass, drums, organ, percussion, production, liner notes
- Dave Cooley – mastering
