= Black Diamond Heavies =

American blues rock band

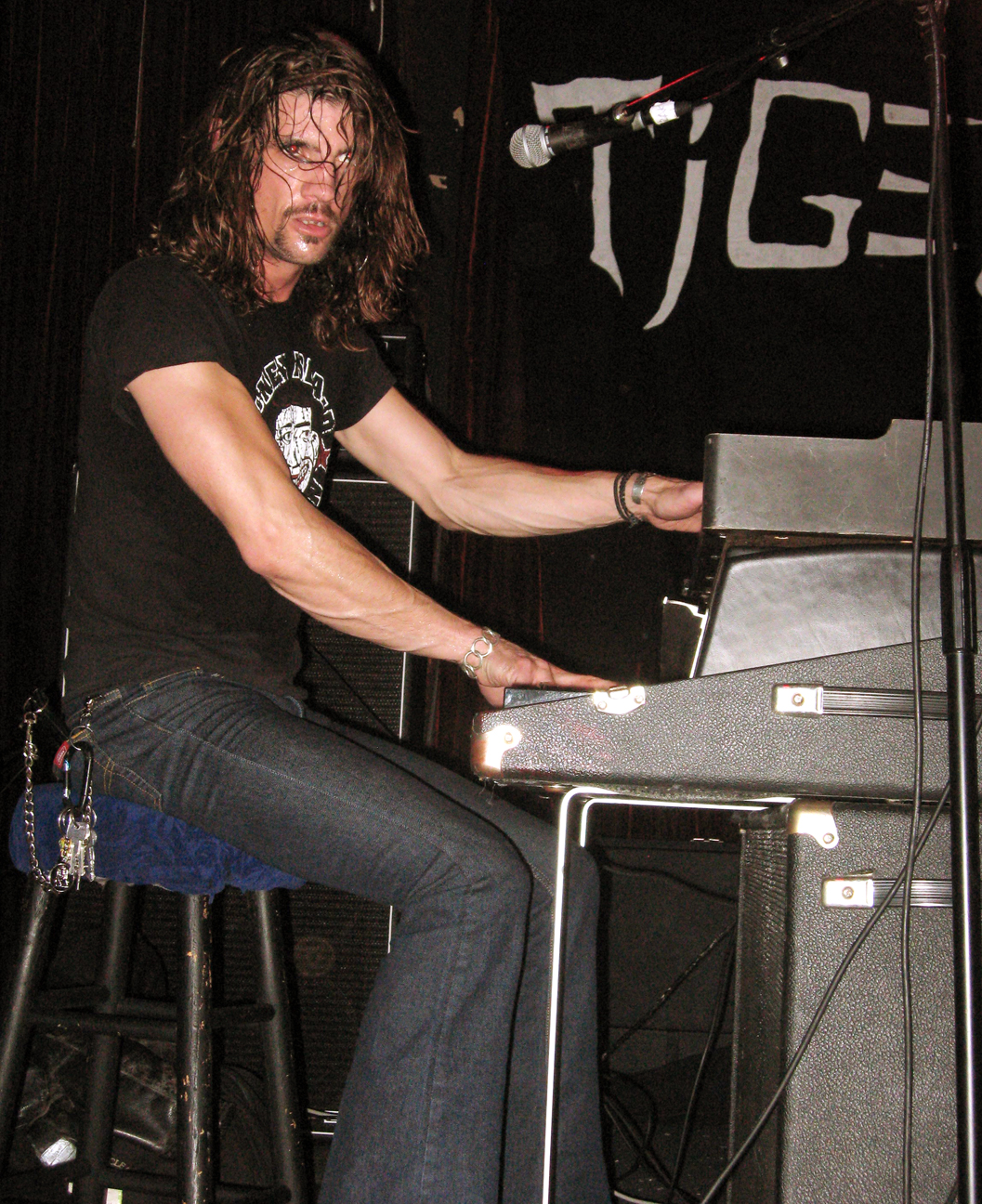
- John Wesley Myers in 2008 playing for Black Diamond Heavies

Background information
- Origin: Nashville, Tennessee, U.S.
- Genres: Rock, blues rock, punk rock, soul, blues
- Years active: 2004–present
- Labels: Alive
- Members: John Wesley Myers (bass keys, Fender Rhodes, organ, and lead vocals 2004–present); Van Campbell (vocals/drums, 2004 – present)
- Past members: Mark "Porkchop" Holder (†)(guitar and harmonica, 2004 – 2006)

Black Diamond Heavies is a United States blues rock band originating from Nashville, Tennessee. The band is composed of John Wesley Myers aka Reverend James Leg, formerly of The Immortal Lee County Killers, on bass keys, Fender Rhodes, organ, and vocals with Van Campbell on drums.

== Style ==
After the departure of Mark "Porkchop" Holder, the guitarist, Black Diamond Heavies set out on a venture to take on the blues from a new perspective, with the only instruments being a keyboard and drums. Myers' soulful, "raspy growl" is reminiscent of and has been compared to singer Tom Waits.

== History ==
=== You Damn Right EP ===
Black Diamond Heavies formed in 2004 as a three piece band: John Wesley Myers on the keyboard and vocals, Mark "Porkchop" Holder on guitar, harmonica and lead vocals, and Van Campbell on the drums. They soon after started performing and in 2005 the Black Diamond Heavies self-released their first EP, You Damn Right. In 2006, Holder left the band after becoming discouraged with the hardships of life on the road. Myers and Campbell decided to continue the band as a two-man act. Soon after, in the summer of 2006, the band was given a record deal with Alive Records.

=== Every Damn Time ===
In 2007, with the band now signed to Alive Records, Black Diamond Heavies released their first studio album, Every Damn Time.

=== A Touch of Someone Else's Class ===
In 2008, Black Diamond Heavies released their second studio album under Alive Records, A Touch Of Someone Else's Class. For their second studio album Black Diamond Heavies turned to Dan Auerbach of The Black Keys who produced the album while it was recorded at his Akron Analog Studio.

=== Alive As Fuck ===
In 2009, Black Diamond Heavies released their first live album, Alive As Fuck, recorded during a gig at the Masonic Lodge, in Covington, KY,. This album was released under the Alive Records label.

=== Solitary Pleasure ===
In December 2010, Myers recorded a solo album, Solitary Pleasure, under his pseudonym, James Leg. The album was released on April 5, 2011, by Alive Records. Jim Diamond (music producer) of Ghetto Recorders mixed Solitary Pleasure.

On March 13, 2025, guitar and harmonica player Mark "Porkchop" Holder died at 52.

== Discography ==
Studio albums

Release date	Title	Label	Notes
2007	Every Damn Time	Alive Records	
2008	A Touch Of Someone Else's Class	Alive Records	
2011	Solitary Pleasure	Alive Records	As James Leg
2012	Painkillers	Alive Records	As James Leg, With Left Lane Cruiser

EPs

Release date	Title	Label
2005	You Damn Right	Self-Released

Live albums

Release date	Title	Label
2009	Alive As Fuck	Alive Records
