= Brimstone Howl =

American punk blues band

- Origin: Nebraska, USA
- Genres: Punk blues Garage rock
- Years active: 2002–present
- Labels: SPEED! Nebraska Records; Boomchick Records; Obsolete Records; Shake Your Ass Records; P Trash Records; Alive Records; Certified PR Records
- Website: Alive Records' site, Myspace page

Brimstone Howl is a punk blues band based in Omaha, Nebraska. They are often called "garage rock", although the band members themselves reject the term. Brimstone Howl has had numerous lineup changes since its inception.

== Music ==
In early 2005, Brimstone Howl released an album entitled Seven Mean Runs on SPEED! Nebraska Records. Later that year the band released their second album Bang! Bang! Bang! Bang! Bang! Bang! Bang! on SPEED! Nebraska. In 2006 the band released four singles on Boomchick, SPEED! Nebraska, and Obsolete Records. Single Blood on the Rocks, Bones in the River was recorded and mixed by Jay Reatard and became the best-selling single in Boomchick Records history. Their next album, Guts of Steel, was released in May 2007 on Alive Records and produced by Dan Auerbach of The Black Keys. Their latest album, We Came in Peace (Alive Records) was recorded by Jim Diamond and released on September 16, 2008.

=== Fourth Album ===
Brimstone Howl released a fourth full-length album, titled Big Deal. What’s He Done Lately? with Alive Records on October 26, 2009.

== Reputation ==
Brimstone Howl has earned a reputation for being a prolific and hard working band. They have continued to release singles from 2007-2010. They have been touring the U.S. relentlessly for three years and toured Europe twice in 2008. Additionally, the band's songs have been used in the television shows Supernatural and Friday Night Lights.

Discography

=== Albums ===
- Seven Mean Runs - CD (SPEED! Nebraska Records, 2005)
- Bang! Bang! Bang! Bang! Bang! Bang! Bang! - CD (SPEED! Nebraska Records, 2005)
- Guts of Steel - CD/LP (Alive Records, 2007)
- We Came in Peace - CD/LP (Alive Records, 2008)
- Big Deal. What’s He Done Lately? - CD/LP (Alive Records, 2009)
- Blowhard Deluxe - LP (Deadbeat Records, 2013)
- Magic Hour - LP/Cassette (Certified PR Records, 2013)

=== Singles ===
- M60 - 7" (Boomchick Records, 2006)
- Blood on the Rocks, Bones in the River - 7" (Boomchick Records, 2006)
- Heat of the Beat - 7" (SPEED! Nebraska Records, 2006)
- Rattle - 7" (Obsolete Records, 2006)
- Uptight - 7" (SYA Records, 2007)
- Tunnel of Love - 7" (Boomchick Records, 2008)
- Euro Tour Single - 2x7" (P Trash/Red Lounge Records, 2008)
- Mammon - 7" (Rob's House Records, 2009)
- split with Hell Shovel - 7" : "Cross Wind" (Certified PR Records #CPR014, 2010)
- Singles Collection - Cassette (Rainy Road Records #RRT-002, 2010)
