= Charlie Whitehead (singer) =

American singer (1942–2015)

- Also known as: Raw Spitt
- Born: Charles Whitehead; September 6, 1942
- Origin: Norfolk, Virginia, U.S.
- Died: June 26, 2015 (aged 72) Brooklyn, New York, U.S.
- Genres: R&B, soul
- Occupations: Singer, songwriter
- Labels: Dynamo, Canyon, United Artists, Stone Dogg, Fungus, Island, Ace

Charlie Whitehead (September 6, 1942 – June 26, 2015) was an American soul singer from Newsoms, Virginia.

== Life and career ==
Whitehead was born on September 6, 1942. He moved to New York City in 1962 and was subsequently signed to Musicor's R&B subsidiary, Dynamo Records, by Charlie Foxx. At Dynamo, Whitehead was paired with Jerry Williams, Jr., and the two wrote songs (often with Gary U.S. Bonds) for artists such as Dee Dee Warwick and Doris Duke, including Warwick's 1970 hit, "She Didn’t Know (She Kept on Talking)".

Releasing only one single on Dynamo, Whitehead followed Williams when he left for Canyon Records. In 1970, using the name Raw Spitt, Whitehead released a self-titled album, produced and mostly written by Williams. An additional song recorded for, but not included on the album, "Songs to Sing" was also released as a single on United Artists.

Whitehead released some material under his own name on Williams' Stone Dogg Records and in 1973, the album Charlie Whitehead and the Swamp Dogg Band on Williams' Fungus Records.

In 1975, he made the Billboard R&B chart with "Love Being Your Fool" on Island Records. He released one more album, 1977's Whitehead at Yellowstone before dropping from view.

A CD compiling Raw Spitt, Charlie Whitehead and the Swamp Dogg Band, and various non-album tracks—called Songs to Sing: The Charlie Whitehead Anthology—was released by Ace Records in 2006.

Whitehead died in Brooklyn, New York, on June 26, 2015, at the age of 72.
