= Murder Junkies =

Studio album by GG Allin & Antiseen
- Released: June 1991
- Recorded: March 1991
- Genre: Hardcore punk; spoken word
- Length: 41:27
- Label: New Rose

GG Allin & Antiseen chronology
Anti-Social Personality Disorder – Live (1990)	Murder Junkies (1991)	Watch Me Kill (1991)

Alternative cover

Murder Junkies is the seventh studio album released by American punk rock musician GG Allin, recorded with Antiseen as his backing band. The album consists of spoken word by Allin, interspersed with musical tracks featuring Allin on vocals backed by Antiseen.

The album was re-released in 2006.

== Track listing ==
=== Original New Rose Records release ===
1. Savage Blood Bath – 0:54
2. Murder for the Mission – Terrorist Anarchy – 1:33
3. Sidewalk Walking – 0:56
4. I Love Nothing – 2:02
5. Self Absorbed – 1:55
6. 99 Stab Wounds – Decapitation Ritual – 1:45
7. No Limits No Laws – 1:37
8. War in My Head – I'm Your Enemy – 3:01
9. A Dead Fuck – 1:16
10. Sister Sodomy – Death and Defecation – 1:28
11. Kill, Kill, Kill – 2:24
12. Violence Now – Assassinate the President – 4:05
13. Drink from the Pissing Snakes Mouth – 1:02
14. Rape, Torture, Terminate and Fuck – 1:09
15. Guns and Revolution – 0:40
16. Kill the Police – Destroy the System – 2:18
17. Immortal Pieces of Me – 1:56
18. My Prison Walls – 206045 – 3:55
19. Death Before Life – Bloody Cunt Slider – 0:22
20. I Hate People – 6:58

=== TKO Records reissue ===
1. Murder for the Mission
2. I Love Nothing
3. 99 Stab Wounds
4. War in My Head
5. Sister Sodomy
6. Violence Now
7. Rape, Torture, Terminate & Fuck
8. Kill the Police
9. I Hate People
10. My Prison Walls
11. Layin' Up with Linda
12. I Wanna Fuck the Shit Out of You
13. Outlaw Scumfuc
