= FGL Productions =

- Industry: Music
- Founded: 1981
- Headquarters: Paris, France
- Owner: Thierry Wolf (CEO)
- Website: www.fglproductions.com

FGL Productions is an independent music record, entertainment and video production company, headquartered in France (Paris), with offices in the United Kingdom (London), Russia (Moscow), and Thailand (Nonthaburi).

== FGL Productions’ history ==
Founded in Paris in 1981 as a music record company focusing on re-issuing of major works from the popular music catalogue, the company is managed, since 1990, by his current chief executive officer Thierry Wolf.

== FGL Productions’ services ==
FGL Productions is organized around four departments:

- Music publishing department, with a significant number of French and international song writers and music composers,
- Video production house, producing musical videos, TV documentaries and movies (Executive production),
- Synchronisation department, offering movie, TV series, and advertising movie producers, or video game editors, a rich repertoire of music matching to images,
- Event department, dedicated to live performances, and worldwide tours (especially in Eastern Europe and Russia), as well as corporate events.

== FGL Productions’ 30 Labels ==
FGL Productions also manages musical rights of thirty music labels, such Revenge, Play-Time, Eva, Lolita, Editions 23, Anthology Recordings, Axe Killer, Mantra Recordings, Orphée, Edition Garzon...

- Anthology Recordings (pop)
- AUSTERLITZ (variety)
- AXE KILLER (Hard Rock)
- EDITIONS 23 (Movie music)
- EDITION GARZON (Latino music)
- EVA (reissues of 60s songs)
- FGL VISION (video)
- JURASSIC PUNK (punk rock)
- KOSMOS (world)
- LATINO ARCHIVES
- LOLITA
- LE PETIT TROUBADOUR (children)
- Mantra Recordings (progressive rock)
- ORPHEE (French song)
- PLAY TIME (soundtracks)
- RADIO BANZAÏ (radio program)
- REMEDY (rock)
- REVENGE (rock)
- SAWASDEE (electro world)
- SILVA FRANCE (soundtracks)
- SWING MANIA (ambiance)
- VIA CLASSIC (classical music)
