= Radio Moscow (band) =

American psychedelic rock band

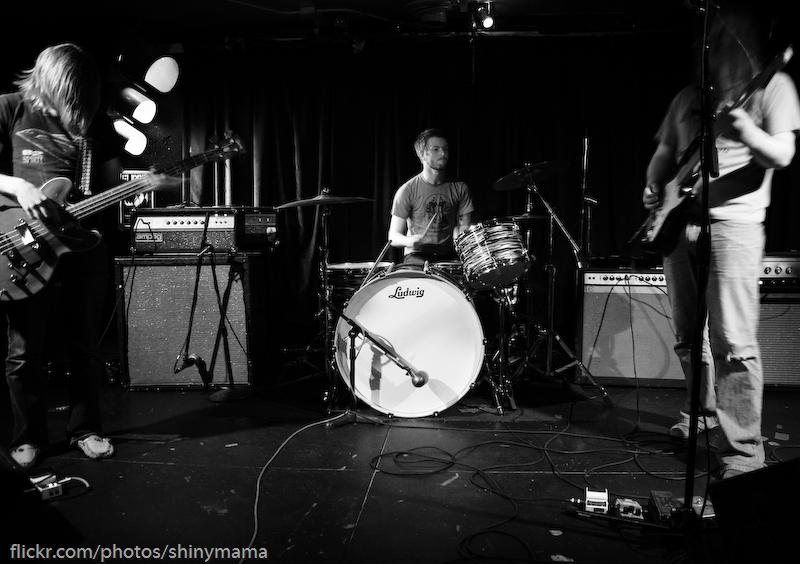
- Radio Moscow performing in 2008. From left to right: Zach Anderson (former member), Keith Rich (former member) and Parker Griggs

Background information
- Origin: Story City, Iowa, United States
- Genres: Psychedelic rock, blues rock, garage rock, hard rock, acid rock
- Years active: 2003–present
- Label: Alive Naturalsound
- Members: Parker Griggs; Anthony Meier; Paul Marrone
- Past members: Serana Rose; Luke McDuff; Zach Anderson; Cory Berry; Keith Rich; Todd Stevens; Lonnie Blanton
- Website: radiomoscow.net

Radio Moscow is an American psychedelic rock band from Story City, Iowa. Formed in 2003, the band currently features singer-guitarist Parker Griggs, bassist Anthony Meier and drummer Paul Marrone. Signed to Alive Naturalsound Records, the trio has released five full-length albums as of June 2017.

There was an earlier British hard rock band called "Radio Moscow," active from 1987 into the 1990s, which featured Brian Tatler, of Diamond Head on guitar.

== History ==
=== Early years ===
Prior to the formation of the band, Parker Griggs recorded under the solo alias Garbage Composal. After completing an album's worth of material, Griggs enlisted bassist Serana Rose to form Radio Moscow, and the duo relocated to Colorado. Following a show, Griggs got a demo into the hands of The Black Keys frontman Dan Auerbach, who then helped in getting Radio Moscow signed to Alive Naturalsound Records. During this time, Parker recorded the contents of 3 & 3 Quarters which was eventually released in 2012 under Radio Moscow. The album is predominantly Garage Rock, with all instruments handled by Griggs.

=== Radio Moscow ===
Upon returning to Iowa, Luke McDuff was brought in as the new bassist of the group. They recorded the band's debut album in 2006, with Auerbach handling production duties; Radio Moscow was released in February 2007. Shortly after the release of the album, McDuff was replaced by Zach Anderson.

=== Brain Cycles & The Great Escape of Leslie Magnafuzz ===
Since 2007, Radio Moscow have toured many regions of the world, with a number of live drummers including Keith Rich, Todd Stevens and Paul Marrone. The band's second album Brain Cycles was released in April 2009, this time self-produced by the band.

Radio Moscow later released their third album The Great Escape of Leslie Magnafuzz in October 2011. A previously unreleased album entitled 3 & 3 Quarters, recorded in 2003 and featuring Griggs only, was released in April 2012. During a concert in support of the album, a physical confrontation erupted on stage involving Parker and drummer, Berry, in which a guitar was thrown at Parker which stuck him on the head and created a gash that later required fourteen stitches. Zach Anderson and Cory Berry immediately left the band and went on to form Blues Pills in Sweden.

=== Magical Dirt ===
On their official website Radio Moscow announced that they planned on releasing their fourth studio album sometime in 2013. Bassist Billy Ellsworth left the band in July, and was replaced with Anthony Meier. On July 15, 2013 the band announced that they were happy with the progress of their new album and planned to 'road test' them in Europe. On December 11, 2013 it was announced that the band was set to begin recording their latest album that month. The album was completed by January 22, 2014. On February the 11th the band announced their fourth album was to be called Magical Dirt. The album was released on June 17, 2014.

Live! In California, the band's first live album, was released in 2016. It was recorded over two nights at The Satellite Club in Los Angeles, compiled of material from their studio albums, along with a cover version of Sainte Anthony's Fyre's song, Chance of Fate.

=== New Beginnings ===
On January 19, 2017, the band announced via social media that they had signed to Century Media Records, and that work had already begun on their fifth full-length album. They entered the studio in April. They soon announced that their first album with the new record label, New Beginnings, was planned for release on September 29 and that there was to be a supporting "The Drifting Tour" across Europe, including several festivals, with special guests Kaleidobolt. The artwork for the album, along with the lead single, New Beginning was unveiled on July 18.

In 2018, the band embarked on their first Australian tour.

== Musical style and influence ==
Radio Moscow are often compared stylistically to blues rock bands from the 1960s and 1970s, particularly fellow power trios like Cream and The Jimi Hendrix Experience, or rock bands with heavy rhythm sections like Pretty Things, The Who and Blue Cheer. Reviewing the band's self-titled album for music website AllMusic, Greg Prato described the group's sound as "a throwback to the classic rock of the '70s", comparing certain songs to artists such as Ram Jam, The Allman Brothers Band and The Jeff Beck Group. Following the release of Brain Cycles, Radio Moscow have also been cited as an example of the stoner rock genre.

== Band members ==
Current members

- Parker Griggs – vocals, guitars, drums, percussion (2003–present)
- Anthony Meier – bass (2013–present)
- Paul Marrone – drums (2010, 2012–present)

Former members

- Serana Rose – bass (2003–2006)
- Luke McDuff – bass (2006–2007)
- Zach Anderson – bass (2007–2012)
- Billy Ellsworth – bass (2012–2013)
- Cory Berry – live drums (2007, 2009–2010, 2010–2012)
- Keith Rich – live drums (2007–2008)
- Todd Stevens – live drums (2007–2008)
- Lonnie Blanton – live drums (2012)

== Discography ==
=== Studio albums ===
- Radio Moscow (2007)
- Brain Cycles (2009)
- The Great Escape of Leslie Magnafuzz (2011)
- Magical Dirt (2014)
- New Beginnings (2017)

=== Live albums ===
- Live! In California (2016)

=== EPs ===
- Rancho Tehama EP (2013)

=== Compilation albums ===
- 3 & 3 Quarters (2012) - a collection of demos recorded in 2003 by frontman Parker Griggs before the formation of the band
