= The Sights =

Rock and roll band

The Sights are an American rock and roll band from Detroit, Michigan, formed in 1998. The band has toured in the United States, Canada, and the UK.

== Members ==
Current

- Eddie Baranek: Vocals, Guitar
- Jarrod Champion: Keyboard, Vocals
- Skip Denomme: Drums
- Roderick Jones: Saxophone
- Liz Mackinder: Vocals
- Chrissy Morgan: Vocals
- Kyle Schanta: Bass Guitar, Vocals

Former

- Nate Cavalieri (2002-2003): Organ, Vocals
- Bobby Emmett (2004-2007): Organ, Piano Bass, Vocals
- Keith Fox (2005-2007): Drums
- Matt Hatch (2003-2004): Bass Guitar
- Dave Knepp (1998-1999): Drums
- Dave Lawson (2009-2011): Bass Guitar, Vocals
- Mark Leahey (1998-2002): Bass Guitar
- David Shettler (2000-2003): Drums, Vocals
- Gordon Smith (2009-2011): Keyboard, Vocals
- Eugene Strobe (1999-2001): Drums
- Dean Tartaglia (2011-2012): Saxophone, Backing Vocals
- Mike Trombley (1998, 2003–2005): Drums

== Achievements ==
- In 2012, The Sights toured the United States and Europe with Tenacious D.
- In 2014, the band's published tour diary, "Taken Alive: The Sights' Rock and Roll Tour Diary," was recognized as one of twenty 2014 Michigan Notable Books by The Library of Michigan. The book includes entries and photographs written and taken for The Detroit Metro Times.

== Discography ==
Studio albums

- Are You Green? (1999, Spectator Records; reissued on Fall of Rome Records)
- Got What We Want (2002, Fall of Rome Records)
- The Sights (2005, New Line Records)
- Most of What Follows Is True (2010, Alive Records)
- Left Over Right (2012, Hiros Rise Music)

EPs

- Silver/Gold 12" EP (2009, Lower Peninsula Records)

Compilations

- Twelve In The Bar (2011, Fountain Records)
