= Outrageous Cherry =

American pop band

Outrageous Cherry was an American psychedelic pop / power pop and punk band from Detroit, Michigan, United States.

Outrageous Cherry formed in 1991, and soon expanded to a four-piece after performing live in 1993. The group has released 13 albums, including 2014's The Digital Age.

Larry Ray, the band's guitarist, died at the age of 63 from lung cancer on October 24, 2017.

== Former members ==
- Matthew Smith - vocals, guitar
- Colleen Burke - bass
- Maria Nuccilli - drums
- Larry Ray - guitar
- Chad Gilchrist - bass
- Deb Agolli - drums
- Suzanna Mroz - drums

== Discography ==
=== Albums ===
- Outrageous Cherry (Bar/None, 1994) (vinyl in 2010 via Microfiche Records)
- X-Rays in the Cloudnine (Mind Expansion, 1996) (ME-016)
- Stereo Action Rent Party (Third Gear Records, 1996)
- Nothing's Gonna Cheer You Up (Third Gear, 1997)
- Out There in the Dark (Del-Fi Records, 1999)
- The Book of Spectral Projections (Rainbow Quartz Records, 2001)
- Supernatural Equinox (Rainbow Quartz, 2003)
- Stay Right Here for a Little While (EP) (Rainbow Quartz, 2003)
- Why Don't We Talk About Something Else (EP) (Rainbow Quartz, 2004)
- Our Love Will Change the World (Rainbow Quartz, 2005)
- Stay Happy (Rainbow Quartz, 2006)
- Universal Malcontents (Alive Records, 2009)
- Seemingly Solid Reality (Alive Records, 2010)
- The Digital Age (Burger Records, 2014)
- Meet You in the Shadows (Burger Records, 2018)
