= Alive Naturalsound Records =

American independent record label

- Founded: 1993
- Founder: Patrick Boissel; Suzy Shaw
- Genre: Roots rock; punk blues; Garage rock; Power Pop; garage punk; blues rock; psychedelic rock; space rock; post punk; indie rock; American folk; shoegaze
- Country of origin: United States
- Location: Burbank, California
- Official website: www.alive-records.com

Alive Naturalsound Records (also known as Alive Records) is an independent record label formed in 1993 in Los Angeles, California by Patrick Boissel, specializing in garage rock, punk, psychedelic, and blues rock. It grew out of Boissel's association with the U.S. label Bomp! Records.

== Artists ==
Alive touring bands as of 2025

- Gyasi
- The Bobby Lees
- Dom Mariani
- El Perro (Parker Griggs of Radio Moscow)
- Left Lane Cruiser
- Paul Collins
- Radio Moscow
- James Leg
- Datura4
- Handsome Jack
- The Black Keys
- Lee Bains III & The Glory Fires
- Prima Donna
- Lonesome Shack

Artists with releases on Alive Naturalsound

- All Tomorrow's Party
- Andre Williams
- Andy Gabbard
- Beachwood Sparks
- Beechwood
- Bed of Eyes
- Big Midnight
- Bloodhounds
- Black Angel's Death Song
- Black Diamond Heavies
- Bloody Hollies
- The Bobby Lees
- Boyskout
- Brian Olive
- Brimstone Howl
- Buffalo Killers
- Certain General
- Charlie Whitehead
- Colonel Knowledge & the Lickety Splits
- Datura4
- Detonations
- Deviants IXVI
- Dirty Streets
- Dom Mariani
- El Perro ((Parker Griggs of Radio Moscow))
- DM3 w/ Dom Mariani
- Dodge Main (Deniz Tek, Wayne Kramer, and Scott Morgan - MC5)
- Doris Duke
- Dripping Lips
- G.G. Allin and The Murder Junkies
- Gardens
- Gyasi
- Hacienda
- Handsome Jack
- Henry's Funeral Shoe
- Hollis Brown
- Howlin’ Diablos
- Iggy Pop
- James Williamson
- Irma Thomas
- Jack Lee (The Nerves)
- James Leg (Black Diamond Heavies)
- John Sinclair
- John The Conqueror
- Kim Fowley
- King Mud (Black Diamond Heavies and Left Lane Cruiser)
- Lee Bains III & The Glory Fires
- Left Lane Cruiser
- Libertine
- Lightnin' Slim
- Lonesome Shack
- Mark "Porkchop" Holder (Black Diamond Heavies)
- Martin Rev (Suicide)
- MC5
- Mick Farren
- Milky Ways
- Mondo Drag
- Mount Carmel
- Mr. Gloria's Head
- Murder Junkies (G.G. Allin)
- Nathaniel Mayer
- Neither/Neither World
- Nikki Sudden (Swell Maps)
- Occult Detective Club
- Outrageous Cherry
- Painkillers (Left Lane Cruiser and James Leg)
- Paul Collins (The Nerves)
- PepGirlz
- Peter Case (The Nerves)
- Prima Donna
- Radio Moscow
- RF7
- Ron Franklin
- Rosetta West
- Sandra Phillips
- Scott Morgan
- Soledad Brothers
- Sonic's Rendezvous Band (Scott Morgan, MC5)
- SSM
- Stoneage Hearts
- Streetwalkin’ Cheetahs
- Sulfur City
- Swamp Dogg
- Swell Maps (Nikki Sudden)
- T-Model Ford
- The Black Keys
- The Bloodhounds
- The Bonnevilles
- The Breakaways (Peter Case, Paul Collins)
- The Deviants (Mick Farren)
- Germs
- The Love Drunks
- The Nerves
- The Plimsouls
- The Powder Monkeys
- The Red Tyger Church
- The Sights
- The Streetwalkin’ Cheetahs
- Thee Michelle Gun Elephant
- Thomas Function
- Trainwreck Riders
- Turpentine Brothers
- Two Gallants
- Tyson Vogel (Two Gallants)
- U.S. Bombs
- Very Ape
- Waves of Fury
- Wayne Kramer
- White Noise Sound
- Witches
- Wolfmoon
- Z.Z. Hill

== Discography ==
Selected releases for Alive Naturalsound Records
Yr	Cat. #	Release title	Artist(s)
2025	ALIVE238	Broke Down Lines / Hit The Stone – DL Single	Left Lane Cruiser
2025	ALIVE237	Here Comes The Good Part	[Gyasi]
2025	ALIVE236	Beauty Pageant	The Bobby Lees
2024	ALIVE235	Jangleland / Day After Day	[Dom Mariani]
2024	ALIVE234	Sweet Thing – DL Single	[Gyasi]
2024	ALIVE233	Bayport BBQ Blues	Left Lane Cruiser
2024	ALIVE232	Rock n’ roll Sword Fight	[Gyasi]
2023	ALIVE231	23 – EP	Gyasi
2023	ALIVE229	Invisible Hits	Datura4
2023	ALIVE228	Bring Yo’ Ass To The Table w/ bonus tracks	Left Lane Cruiser
2023	ALIVE227	Baby Blue - DL single	[Gyasi]
2022	ALIVE226	Live At The Deep Blues Fest 2008	T-Model Ford
2022	ALIVE225	Live At The Club Azteca 1978	The Weirdos
2022	ALIVE224	Stay Tuff / Lost Cuts	Buffalo Killers
2022	ALIVE223	Neanderthal Jam w/Dom Mariani	Datura4
2022	ALIVE222	Pronounced Jah-See	Gyasi
2022	ALIVE221	All To Hell	Black Diamond Heavies
2022	ALIVE220	Hair Of	El Perro
2022	ALIVE219	Going Back To Hoonsville – DL Single	Datura4
2021	ALIVE218	Have You Heard This Story	Swamp Dogg
2022	ALIVE217	Sleep Without Dreaming	Beechwood
2021	ALIVE216	Get Humble	Handsome Jack
2021	ALIVE215	I Was Born In A Swamp	T-Model Ford
2021	ALIVE214	Alter Echoes	Triptides
2020	ALIVE213	Between Dimensions Vol.2	The Telescopes
2020	ALIVE212	Between Dimensions Vol.1	The Telescopes
2020	ALIVE211	Another World/The Best Of The Archives	Paul Collins' Beat
2020	ALIVE210	Rough and Tumble	Dirty Streets
2020	ALIVE209	Skin Suit	The Bobby Lees
2020	ALIVE208	West Coast Highway Cosmic	Datura4
2019	ALIVE207	Everyday Dreams	Jesper Lindell
2019	ALIVE206	Let It Burn	GospelbeacH
2019	ALIVE205	Shake and Bake	Left Lane Cruiser
2019	ALIVE204	Blessed is the Boogie	Datura4
2019	ALIVE203	Desert Dreams	Lonesome Shack
2019	ALIVE202	Trash Glamour	Beechwood
2018	ALIVE201	Another Winter Alive	GospelbeacH
2018	ALIVE200	Everything's Gonna be Alright	Handsome Jack
2018	ALIVE199	Out Of My Head	Paul Collins
2018	ALIVE198	Inside The Flesh Hotel	Beechwood
2018	ALIVE197	Dirty Photographs	The Bonnevilles
2018	ALIVE196	Songs From The Land Of Nod	Beechwood
2017	ALIVE195	Death And The Blues	Mark “Porkchop” Holder
2017	ALIVE194	Alive And Well In Ohio	Buffalo Killers
2017	ALIVE193	Change of Heart/Dreamin'	GospelbeacH
2017	ALIVE192	Another Summer Of Love	GospelbeacH
2017	ALIVE190	Listen For Tone	The Bonnevilles
2017	ALIVE189	Claw Machine Wizard	Left Lane Cruiser
2017	ALIVE188	Let It Slide	Mark Porkchop Holder
2017	ALIVE187	s/t	Heath Green and The Makeshifters
2016	ALIVE186	Bigger Than Life	Jack Lee
2016	ALIVE185	Hairy Mountain	Datura4
2016	ALIVE184	Blood On The Keys	James Leg
2016	ALIVE183	Live! In California	Radio Moscow
2016	ALIVE181	Talking Loud	Sulfur City
2016	ALIVE180	Arrow Pierce My Heart	The Bonnevilles
2016	ALIVE179	Beck In Black	Left Lane Cruiser
2016	ALIVE178	Cluster Of Pearls	Hollis Brown
2016	ALIVE177	The Victory Motel Sessions	King Mud
2015	ALIVE176	White Horse	Dirty Streets
2015	ALIVE175	West Of Anywhere	DM3
2015	ALIVE174	Pacific Surf Line	GospelbeacH
2015	ALIVE173	Below The Belt	James Leg
2015	ALIVE172	Demon Blues	Datura4
2015	ALIVE171	Dirty Spliff Blues	Left Lane Cruiser
2015	ALIVE170	Primal Vinyl	Shoes
2015	ALIVE168	Rock n' Roll is a Beautiful Thing - 20th Anniversary	Various
2015	ALIVE167	Fluff	Andy Gabbard
2015	ALIVE166	Nine Lives & Forty Fives	Prima Donna
2014	ALIVE164	The White Man Made Me Do It	Swamp Dogg
2014	ALIVE163	Let Loose!	The Bloodhounds
2014	ALIVE162	Do What Comes Naturally	Handsome Jack
2014	ALIVE161	Feel The Noise	Paul Collins
2014	ALIVE160	Magical Dirt	Radio Moscow
2014	ALIVE159	More Primitive	Lonesome Shack
2014	ALIVE158	Gets Loaded	Hollis Brown
2014	ALIVE157	The Good Life	John The Conqueror
2013	ALIVE154	Desert Skies	Beachwood Sparks
2013	ALIVE153	The Brand New Z.Z. Hill Album	Z.Z. Hill
2013	ALIVE152	I'm A Loser	Doris Duke
2013	ALIVE151	Wolfmoon	Wolfmoon
2013	ALIVE150	Sandra Phillips	Too Many People In One Bed
2013	ALIVE149	Rock Them Back To Hell	Left Lane Cruiser
2013	ALIVE148	Blades Of Grass	The Dirty Streets
2013	ALIVE147	High & Low Down	Lightnin' Slim
2013	ALIVE146	Raw Spitt	Charlie Whitehead
2013	ALIVE145	In Between Tears	Irma Thomas
2013	ALIVE144	Gag A Maggott	Swamp Dogg
2013	ALIVE143	Ohio Grass	Buffalo Killers
2013	ALIVE142	Radt On!	Swamp Dogg
2013	ALIVE141	Total Destruction To Your Mind	Swamp Dogg
2013	ALIVE140	Ride On The Train	Hollis Brown
2012	ALIVE137	Alive at The Deep Blues Fest	Various
2013	ALIVE136	John The Conqueror	John the Conqueror
2012	ALIVE135	Life	Andre Williams
2012	ALIVE132	Dig. Sow. Love. Grow	Buffalo Killers
2012	ALIVE131	Painkillers	Left Lane Cruiser & James Leg
2012	ALIVE130	There's A Bomb In Gilead	Lee Bains III & The Glory Fires
2012	ALIVE129	3 & 3 Quarters	Radio Moscow
2012	ALIVE128	Beach Town Confidential	Plimsouls
2012	ALIVE127	Where Is Parker Griggs	Various
2012	ALIVE126	The Great Escape of Leslie Magnafuzz	Radio Moscow
2011	ALIVE125	Donkey Jacket	Henry's Funeral Shoe
2011	ALIVE124	Yours Until The Bitter End	The Bloody Hollies
2011	ALIVE123	3	Buffalo Killers
2011	ALIVE122	Two Of Everything	Brian Olive
2011	ALIVE121	The Case Files	Peter Case
2011	ALIVE120	Gardens	Gardens
2011	ALIVE119	Solitary Pleasure	James Leg
2011	ALIVE118	Junkyard Speed Ball	Left Lane Cruiser
2011	ALIVE117	Crimes	Occult Detective Club
2010	ALIVE116	A Haunted Person's Guide To The Witches	The Witches
2010	ALIVE115	Taledragger	T-Model Ford and GravelRoad
2010	ALIVE114	Most of What Follows Is True	The Sights
2010	ALIVE112	Kill City	Iggy Pop & James Williamson
2010	ALIVE110	King of Power Pop!	Paul Collins
2010	ALIVE109	Devotionals	Tyson Vogel
2010	ALIVE107	Scott Morgan	Scott Morgan
2010	ALIVE106	Big Red & Barabcoa	Hacienda
2010	ALIVE105	Live! Beg Borrow & Steal	The Plimsouls
2010	ALIVE104	New Rituals	Mondo Drag
2010	ALIVE103	The Ladies Man	T-Model Ford
2009	ALIVE102	Alive As Fuck	Black Diamond Heavies
2009	ALIVE101	Walking Out On Love	The Breakaways
2009	ALIVE100	Big Deal (What's He Done Lately?)	Brimstone Howl
2009	ALIVE099	Live At The Pirate's Cove	The Nerves
2009	ALIVE098	All You Can Eat!!	Left Lane Cruiser
2009	ALIVE097	Never Give Up On Your Hallucinations	Various
2009	ALIVE096	Why Won't You Let Me Be Black?	Nathaniel Mayer
2009	ALIVE095	Brian Olive	Brian Olive
2009	ALIVE094	The Perch	Trainwreck Riders
2009	ALIVE093	Brain Cycles	Radio Moscow
2009	ALIVE092	Universal Malcontents	Outrageous Cherry
2009	ALIVE091	Everything's For Sale	Henry's Funeral Shoe
2008	ALIVE090	One Way Ticket	The Nerves
2008	ALIVE086	Let It Ride	Buffalo Killers
2008	ALIVE085	A Touch of Someone Else's Class	Black Diamond Heavies
2008	ALIVE083	Celebration	Thomas Function
2008	ALIVE082	Break Your Arm For Evolution	SSM
2008	ALIVE081	Bring Yo' Ass to the Table	Left Lane Cruiser
2007	ALIVE079	Why Don't You Give It To Me?	Nathaniel Mayer
2007	ALIVE078	Guts of Steel	Brimstone Howl
2007	ALIVE077	Radio Moscow	Radio Moscow
2007	ALIVE076	Live, Masonic Auditorium Detroit, 01/14/1978	Sonics Rendezvous Band
2007	ALIVE074	Every Damn Time	Black Diamond Heavies
2006	ALIVE073	Nothing to You EP + 3	Two Gallants
2006	ALIVE072	The Throes re-mix	Two Gallants
2006	ALIVE070	Buffalo Killers	Buffalo Killers
2006	ALIVE069	Lonely Road Revival	Trainwreck Riders
2006	ALIVE067	SSM	SSM
2006	ALIVE066	Hardest Walk	Soledad Brothers
2004	ALIVE054	The Throes	Two Gallants
2004	ALIVE053	Free Energy	The Red Tyger Church
2004	ALIVE050	The Sound of San Francisco	Various
2004	ALIVE048	Kosher Boogie	Very Ape
2004	ALIVE047	The Moan	The Black Keys
2002	ALIVE044	The Big Come Up	The Black Keys
2001	ALIVE043	Collection	Thee Michelle Gun Elephant
2000	ALIVE042	The Last Bandit	Nikki Sudden
1999	ALIVE039	November's Heat	Certain General
1999	ALIVE038	Old Skars & Upstarts	Various
1999	ALIVE036	Forming	Germs
1999	ALIVE035	International Rescue	Swell Maps
1997	ALIVE032	Cherry Bomb	The Runaways/The Streetwalkin’ Cheetahs
1997	ALIVE031	Do The Pop	The Streetwalkin’ Cheetahs w/ Deniz Tek
1996	ALIVE022	Eating Jello with a Heated Fork	Deviants IXVI
1996	ALIVE021	Satan Vs. The Working Man	RF7
1996	ALIVE017	U.S. Bombs	U.S. Bombs
1996	ALIVE016	Persecution Blues	The Powder Monkeys
1995	ALIVE015	Feed My Sleaze	Murder Junkies
1995	ALIVE014	Ptooff!	The Deviants
1995	ALIVE010	Friday the 13th	Wayne Kramer & John Sinclair
1994	ALIVE007	Worm Culture	Kim Fowley
1994	ALIVE005	Power Trip	MC5
1994	ALIVE002	Cheyenne	Martin Rev
1993	ALIVE001	Brutality and Bloodshed for All	G.G. Allin
