= El Camino Tour =

2012–13 concert tour by the Black Keys

- Tour by The Black Keys
- Promotional poster for tour
- Associated album: El Camino
- Start date: January 23, 2012
- End date: July 13, 2013
- Legs: 9
- No. of shows: 129

The El Camino Tour was a worldwide concert tour by American rock duo the Black Keys in support of their 2011 studio album, El Camino. The tour, which spanned 129 shows, began on January 23, 2012, and ended on July 13, 2013. It was the group's first tour playing arenas as a headlining act. The tour grossed $12.7 million in 2012.

== Background ==
In December 2011, the Black Keys announced a 2012 concert tour, their first playing arenas as a headlining act. The tour opened in Europe on January 23, 2012 with three weeks of shows, before visiting North America from March to May. The tour made multiple return visits to Europe and North America throughout the year, while also visiting Australasia from October through November. In total, the group played 112 shows in 2012. Among the support acts that accompanied the band were Band of Skulls, Arctic Monkeys, and Tegan and Sara. After tickets went on sale, the Black Keys' concert at Madison Square Garden in New York City sold out in 15 minutes, resulting in the addition of a second date at the venue to satisfy demand. The tour ended on July 13, 2013, after 129 shows.

Just as it did on its previous tour, the group added bassist Gus Seyffert and keyboardist/guitarist John Wood as touring musicians in order to perform songs as close to their studio arrangements as possible. Guitarist Dan Auerbach explained the decision for the expanded live band: "It wasn't about the size of the venue. It was just that we could afford to do it and our songs deserved it. We wanted to finally present the songs like we'd written them." During the middle portion of each concert, Auerbach and drummer Patrick Carney played older material as a duo without the backing musicians. Many critics singled these performances out as the shows' highlights.

The concert stage used an austere setup with a lighting system and video projections designed by Karl Lemieux. The lighting comprised four banks of on-stage vintage spotlights, along with two disco balls and a lighted sign bearing the band's name that were lowered for the encores. Lemieux's video, which was projected onto a white sheet at the stage's rear, incorporated black-and-white footage of junkyards, deserts, and open highways. Carney explained that the band was aiming for a retro aesthetic, saying, "We kind of wanted to make the whole stage look like an old-school rock 'n' roll show, as much as possible. We're referencing bands in the '70s, what they were doing when they were playing arenas." Moreover, the footage was meant to pay homage to the group's origins. Auerbach said, "We wanted it to represent our music and the Midwest where we're from, the Rust Belt and open spaces. We find that stuff beautiful and uplifting."

== Support acts ==
- Band of Skulls (Leg 1 & 3: Europe)
- Arctic Monkeys (Leg 2: North America)
- Tame Impala (Leg 2: Council Bluffs)
- Tegan and Sara (Leg 4: North America)
- Royal Headache (Leg 5: Australia)
- The Maccabees (Leg 6: Europe)
- Divine Fits (Leg 7: Las Vegas)
- The Flaming Lips (Leg 9: North America)

== Set list ==
1. "Howlin' for You"
2. "Next Girl"
3. "Run Right Back"
4. "Same Old Thing"
5. "Dead and Gone"
6. "Gold on the Ceiling"
7. "Thickfreakness"
8. "Girl Is on My Mind"
9. "I'll Be Your Man"
10. "Your Touch"
11. "Little Black Submarines"
12. "Money Maker"
13. "Strange Times"
14. "Chop and Change" (North America) / "Sinister Kid" (Australasia)
15. "Nova Baby"
16. "Ten Cent Pistol"
17. "Tighten Up"
18. "Lonely Boy"

Encore

19. "Everlasting Light"
20. "She's Long Gone"
21. "I Got Mine"

== Tour dates ==
Date	City	Country	Venue
Leg 1: Europe
January 23, 2012	Antwerp	Belgium	Lotto Arena
January 24, 2012	Lille	France	Zénith de Lille
January 25, 2012	Paris	France	Zénith de Paris
January 27, 2012	Hamburg	Germany	Sporthalle
January 28, 2012	Berlin	Germany	Arena Berlin
January 30, 2012	Milan	Italy	Alcatraz
January 31, 2012	Zürich	Switzerland	Maag Halle
February 1, 2012	Eindhoven	Netherlands	Klokgebouw
February 3, 2012	Nottingham	England	Capital FM Arena
February 4, 2012	Edinburgh	Scotland	Corn Exchange
February 6, 2012	Manchester	England	O2 Apollo
February 7, 2012	Manchester	England	O2 Apollo
February 9, 2012	London	England	Alexandra Palace
February 10, 2012	London	England	Alexandra Palace
February 11, 2012	London	England	Alexandra Palace
Leg 2: North America
March 2, 2012	Cincinnati	United States	U.S. Bank Arena
March 3, 2012	Detroit	United States	Joe Louis Arena
March 4, 2012	Columbus	United States	Value City Arena
March 6, 2012	Portland	United States	Cumberland County Civic Center
March 7, 2012	Boston	United States	TD Garden
March 9, 2012	Washington, D.C.	United States	Verizon Center
March 10, 2012	Philadelphia	United States	Wells Fargo Center
March 12, 2012	New York City	United States	Madison Square Garden
March 13, 2012	Montreal	Canada	Bell Centre
March 14, 2012	Toronto	Canada	Air Canada Centre
March 16, 2012	Indianapolis	United States	Bankers Life Fieldhouse
March 18, 2012	Grand Rapids	United States	Van Andel Arena
March 19, 2012	Chicago	United States	United Center
March 20, 2012	Cleveland	United States	Quicken Loans Arena
March 22, 2012	New York City	United States	Madison Square Garden
March 23, 2012	Norfolk	United States	Constant Convocation Center
March 24, 2012	Charlotte	United States	Bojangles' Coliseum
March 31, 2012	New Orleans	United States	Woldenberg Park
April 13, 2012^{[A]}	Indio	United States	Empire Polo Club
April 20, 2012^{[A]}	Indio	United States	Empire Polo Club
April 22, 2012^{[B]}	Frisco	United States	FC Dallas Stadium
April 24, 2012	The Woodlands	United States	Cynthia Woods Mitchell Pavilion
April 25, 2012	Austin	United States	Frank Erwin Center
April 27, 2012	St. Louis	United States	Chaifetz Arena
April 28, 2012	Tulsa	United States	BOK Center
April 30, 2012	Broomfield	United States	1stBank Center
May 1, 2012	Broomfield	United States	1stBank Center
May 2, 2012	West Valley City	United States	Maverik Center
May 4, 2012	Oakland	United States	Oracle Arena
May 5, 2012	Sacramento	United States	Power Balance Pavilion
May 7, 2012	Portland	United States	Rose Garden
May 8, 2012	Seattle	United States	KeyArena
May 9, 2012	Vancouver	Canada	Rogers Arena
May 11, 2012	Calgary	Canada	Scotiabank Saddledome
May 12, 2012	Edmonton	Canada	Rexall Place
May 14, 2012	Winnipeg	Canada	MTS Centre
May 15, 2012	Minneapolis	United States	Target Center
May 16, 2012	Milwaukee	United States	Bradley Center
May 18, 2012	Columbia	United States	Merriweather Post Pavilion
May 19, 2012	Atlantic City	United States	Ovation Hall
July 20, 2012^{[C]}	Dover, Delaware	United States	Dover International Speedway
July 21, 2012^{[C]}	Dover, Delaware	United States	Dover International Speedway
July 22, 2012^{[C]}	Dover, Delaware	United States	Dover International Speedway
July 28, 2012^{[D]}	New York City	United States	Randall's Island
August 1, 2012	Council Bluffs	United States	Mid-America Center
August 3, 2012^{[E]}	Chicago	United States	Grant Park
August 4, 2012	Toronto	Canada	Molson Canadian Amphitheatre
August 5, 2012^{[F]}	Montreal	Canada	Parc Jean-Drapeau
Leg 3: Europe
August 9, 2012^{[G]}	Gothenburg	Sweden	Slottsskogen
August 10, 2012^{[H]}	Oslo	Norway	Middelalderparken
August 11, 2012^{[I]}	Helsinki	Finland	Suvilahti
August 13, 2012	Copenhagen	Denmark	Tap1
August 14, 2012	Hanover	Germany	AWD Hall
August 15, 2012^{[J]}	Sankt Pölten	Austria	Green Park
August 17, 2012^{[K]}	Biddinghuizen	Netherlands	Spijk en Bremerberg
August 18, 2012^{[L]}	Hasselt	Belgium	Kempische Steenweg
August 19, 2012^{[M]}	Leipzig	Germany	Störmthaler Lake
August 21, 2012^{[N]}	Belfast	Northern Ireland	Boucher Playing Fields
August 22, 2012	Dublin	Ireland	The O2
August 24, 2012^{[O]}	Leeds	England	Bramham Park
August 25, 2012^{[P]}	Paris	France	Domaine National de Saint-Cloud
August 26, 2012^{[O]}	Reading	England	Little John's Farm
Leg 4: North America
September 29, 2012^{[Q]}	New York City	United States	Central Park
October 1, 2012	Fresno	United States	Save Mart Center
October 2, 2012	Santa Barbara	United States	Santa Barbara Bowl
October 4, 2012	San Diego	United States	Valley View Casino Center
October 5, 2012	Los Angeles	United States	Staples Center
October 6, 2012	Los Angeles	United States	Staples Center
October 8, 2012	Anaheim	United States	Honda Center
October 9, 2012	Phoenix	United States	US Airways Center
October 10, 2012	Las Cruces	United States	Pan American Center
October 12, 2012^{[R]}	Austin	United States	Zilker Park
October 14, 2012^{[S]}	Mexico City	Mexico	Autódromo Hermanos Rodríguez
Leg 5: Australia / New Zealand
October 21, 2012	Newcastle	Australia	Newcastle Entertainment Centre
October 22, 2012	Sydney	Australia	Sydney Entertainment Centre
October 23, 2012	Sydney	Australia	Sydney Entertainment Centre
October 26, 2012	Brisbane	Australia	Brisbane Entertainment Centre
October 28, 2012^{[T]}	Joondalup	Australia	Arena Joondalup
October 30, 2012	Adelaide	Australia	Adelaide Entertainment Centre
October 31, 2012	Melbourne	Australia	Sidney Myer Music Bowl
November 1, 2012	Melbourne	Australia	Sidney Myer Music Bowl
November 3, 2012	Auckland	New Zealand	Vector Arena
November 5, 2012	Wellington	New Zealand	TSB Bank Arena
Leg 6: Europe
November 27, 2012	Lisbon	Portugal	Pavilhão Atlântico
November 28, 2012	Madrid	Spain	Palacio de Deportes
November 30, 2012	Lyon	France	Halle Tony Garnier
December 1, 2012	Turin	Italy	Torino Palasport Olimpico
December 3, 2012	Amsterdam	Netherlands	Ziggo Dome
December 4, 2012	Munich	Germany	Olympiahalle
December 5, 2012	Düsseldorf	Germany	ISS Dome
December 7, 2012	Newcastle	England	Metro Radio Arena
December 8, 2012	Glasgow	Scotland	S.E.C.C
December 9, 2012	Birmingham	England	National Indoor Arena
December 11, 2012	Manchester	England	Manchester Arena
December 12, 2012	London	England	The O_{2} Arena
December 13, 2012	London	England	The O_{2} Arena
Leg 7: North America
December 30, 2012	Las Vegas	United States	The Joint
December 31, 2012	Las Vegas	United States	The Joint
Leg 8: South America
March 30, 2013^{[U]}	São Paulo	Brazil	Jockey Club
April 2, 2013	Montevideo	Uruguay	Teatro de Verano Ramon Collazo
April 3, 2013^{[V]}	Buenos Aires	Argentina	Estadio Costanera Sur
April 7, 2013^{[W]}	Santiago	Chile	O'Higgins Park
Leg 9: North America
April 28, 2013	Kansas City	United States	Sprint Center
April 30, 2013	Pittsburgh	United States	Consol Energy Center
May 2, 2013	Atlanta	United States	Aaron's Amphitheatre at Lakewood
May 3, 2013	Nashville	United States	Bridgestone Arena
May 4, 2013^{[X]}	Memphis	United States	Tom Lee Park
May 5, 2013^{[Y]}	New Orleans	United States	Fair Grounds Race Course
May 10, 2013^{[Z]}	Napa Valley	United States	Napa Valley Expo
May 18, 2013^{[AA]}	Irvine	United States	Verizon Wireless Amphitheatre
July 4, 2013^{[BB]}	Ottawa	Canada	LeBreton Festival Park
July 5, 2013^{[CC]}	Laval	Canada	Espace Montmorency
July 6, 2013^{[DD]}	Quebec City	Canada	Plains of Abraham
July 8, 2013	Buffalo	United States	Buffalo Outer Harbor
July 9, 2013	Hartford	United States	Comcast Theatre
July 11, 2013	Raleigh	United States	Time Warner Cable Music Pavilion
July 12, 2013	Greenville	United States	Charter Amphitheatre
July 13, 2013^{[EE]}	Louisville	United States	Louisville Waterfront Park

Festivals and other miscellaneous performances

^{A} These concerts were part of the Coachella Valley Music and Arts Festival.
^{B} This concert was part of Edgefest 2012.
^{C} These concerts are part of the Firefly Music Festival.
^{D} This concert is part of the Catalpa Festival.
^{E} This concert is part of Lollapalooza.
^{F} This concert is part of the Osheaga Festival.
^{G} This concert is part of the Way Out West Festival.
^{H} This concert is part of the Øyafestivalen.
^{I} This concert is part of the Flow Festival.
^{J} This concert was part of the Frequency Festival.
^{K} This concert was part of the Lowlands Festival.
^{L} This concert was part of Pukkelpop.
^{M} This concert was part of the HighField Festival.
^{N} This concert was part of Tennent's Vital.
^{O} These concerts were part of the Reading and Leeds Festivals.
^{P} This concert was part of Rock en Seine.

^{Q} This concert was part of Global Poverty Project's Global Festival.
^{R} This concert was part of the Austin City Limits Music Festival.
^{S} This concert was part of the Corona Capital Festival.
^{T} This concert was part of Rock-It.
^{U} This concert is part of Lollapalooza Brazil.
^{V} This concert is part of El Festival Mas Grande.
^{W} This concert is part of Lollapalooza Chile.
^{X} This concert is part of the Beale Street Music Festival.
^{Y} This concert is part of the New Orleans Jazz & Heritage Festival.
^{Z} This concert is part of BottleRock Napa Valley.
^{AA} This concert is part of KROQ Weenie Roast.
^{BB} This concert is part of Ottawa Bluesfest.
^{CC} This concert is part of Mondial Choral
^{DD} This concert is part of Festival d'été de Québec
^{EE} This concert is part of the Forecastle Festival.

=== Box office data ===
Venue	City	Tickets sold / Available	Gross revenue
Lotto Arena	Antwerp	7,332 / 7,347 (99%)	$273,699
Capital FM Arena	Nottingham	7,129 / 7,129 (100%)	$236,989
Manchester Apollo	Manchester	6,816 / 6,816 (100%)	$226,239
Alexandra Palace	London	30,259 / 30,259 (100%)	$1,105,060
Verizon Center	Washington D.C.	12,625 / 12,625 (100%)	$616,434
Air Canada Centre	Toronto	14,887 / 14,887 (100%)	$792,991
Van Andel Arena	Grand Rapids	8,277 / 10,859 (76%)	$336,812
United Center	Chicago	14,386 / 14,386 (100%)	$687,274
Constant Convocation Center	Norfolk	6,789 / 6,789 (100%)	$310,786
Maverik Center	Salt Lake City	5,297 / 7,500 (71%)	$268,984
Oracle Arena	Oakland	12,744 / 12,744 (100%)	$630,828
Power Balance Pavilion	Sacramento	9,170 / 9,170 (100%)	$434,275
Rogers Arena	Vancouver	12,483 / 12,483 (100%)	$647,977
Scotiabank Saddledome	Calgary	12,180 / 12,180 (100%)	$637,145
MTS Centre	Winnipeg	6,856 / 6,856 (100%)	$356,750
Bradley Center	Milwaukee	7,460 / 8,000 (93%)	$274,070
Mid-America Center	Council Bluffs	4,897 / 6,000 (82%)	$227,711
Save Mart Center	Fresno	4,795 / 6,500 (76%)	$237,353
Santa Barbara Bowl	Santa Barbara	4,965 / 4,965 (100%)	$337,109
Staples Center	Los Angeles	24,821 / 26,990 (92%)	$1,246,127
Honda Center	Anaheim	10,518 / 13,228 (80%)	$435,824
Entertainment Centre	Brisbane	7,753 / 8,505 (91%)	$802,857
The O2 Arena	London	28,723 / 33,898 (85%)	$1,384,780
The Joint	Las Vegas	7,237 / 8,024 (90%)	$993,107
