= El Camino (The Black Keys album) =

Studio album by the Black Keys
- Released: December 6, 2011
- Recorded: March – May 2011
- Studio: Easy Eye Sound (Nashville)
- Genres: Garage rock; blues rock
- Length: 38:18
- Label: Nonesuch
- Producers: Danger Mouse; The Black Keys

The Black Keys chronology
Brothers (2010)	El Camino (2011)	Turn Blue (2014)

Singles from El Camino
- 1. "Lonely Boy" / "Run Right Back" Released: October 26, 2011; 2. "Gold on the Ceiling" Released: February 27, 2012; 3. "Dead and Gone" Released: May 21, 2012; 4. "Little Black Submarines" Released: October 8, 2012

El Camino is the seventh studio album by the American rock duo the Black Keys, released on December 6, 2011, through Nonesuch Records. Co-produced by Danger Mouse and the Black Keys, it was the follow-up to the band's commercial breakthrough, Brothers (2010), and was their third collaboration with Danger Mouse. El Camino draws from popular genres of the 1950s to the 1970s, such as rock and roll, glam rock, rockabilly, surf rock and soul. Danger Mouse contributed as a co-writer on each of the 11 songs alongside guitarist Dan Auerbach and drummer Patrick Carney.

The album was recorded from March to May 2011 in Nashville, Tennessee, at Easy Eye Sound Studio, which Auerbach opened the year prior. The band approached writing and recording differently than on previous albums, as they entered the studio without having written any material and deliberated longer on how to structure songs. After struggling to translate the slower songs from Brothers to a live setting, the band wrote more uptempo, hook-laden tracks for El Camino. The album's cover art depicts a minivan similar to one the group toured in early in their career, but in an inside joke, they named the record after the El Camino muscle car. A faux newspaper advertisement and parody car commercial playing on this joke were used to promote the record prior to release.

Lead single "Lonely Boy" became the group's highest-charting single in several countries, including the United States, Australia, and Canada. The album was acclaimed by critics and was ranked in many publications' year-end lists of the best albums of the year. It debuted at number two on the US Billboard 200 and reached the top five of the album charts in Australia, Canada, Belgium (Flanders), and New Zealand. The album was certified multi-platinum in the US, Australia, Canada, and New Zealand, as well as platinum in the United Kingdom, France, and Ireland. The Black Keys supported the album with the El Camino Tour, their first headlining arena tour. Four additional singles were released, including "Gold on the Ceiling" and "Little Black Submarines", which were rock radio successes. El Camino won the award for Best Rock Album at the 55th Annual Grammy Awards, while "Lonely Boy" received honors for Best Rock Performance and Best Rock Song.

== Background ==
From 2001 to 2009, the Black Keys experienced underground success, but after the release of their critically acclaimed sixth studio album, Brothers, the group achieved a commercial breakthrough. The single "Tighten Up" was a sleeper hit on radio, eventually spending 10 weeks at number one on Billboard's Alternative Songs chart in the United States and becoming their first song to enter the Billboard Hot 100. The album debuted at number three on the Billboard 200 chart and sold 1.5 million copies worldwide, including 870,000 copies in the US. The band also gained additional exposure by continuing to license their songs in popular media, making them Warner Bros. Records' most-licensed band of the year. At the 53rd Annual Grammy Awards in February 2011, the band won awards for Best Alternative Music Album (for Brothers) and Best Rock Performance by a Duo or Group with Vocal (for "Tighten Up").

The band's sudden success proved overwhelming, as they found themselves booking additional promotional commitments and facing demand for additional touring dates. In January 2011, the group canceled concerts in Australia, New Zealand, and Europe, citing exhaustion, thus clearing out most of their touring schedule into April. Drummer Patrick Carney said, "We've been touring long enough to know when we're about to hit our breaking point." The desire to record another album soon after Brothers also led to the decision. Carney said, "We could have waited another year or so, and milked the Brothers album and kept touring, but we like bands, and our favourite bands growing up and even today, are bands that put out a lot of music and every album is different from the last."

== Recording ==
El Camino was recorded in Nashville, Tennessee, at Easy Eye Sound Studio, which was opened by guitarist/vocalist Dan Auerbach in mid-2010 after he relocated from the group's long-time hometown of Akron, Ohio. Carney spoke of how the success of Brothers impacted the follow-up record: "For me, there were physical jitters about everything that was going on. Seeing how big the shows were getting, feeling like people were paying attention, kind of made me anxious, and I think that's part of the reason [El Camino's] songs are so fast. I think we wanted to just muscle through it." Despite the growing expectations of the band, Carney said that the El Camino recording sessions were much more relaxed than those for Brothers, during which he had been dealing with his divorce.

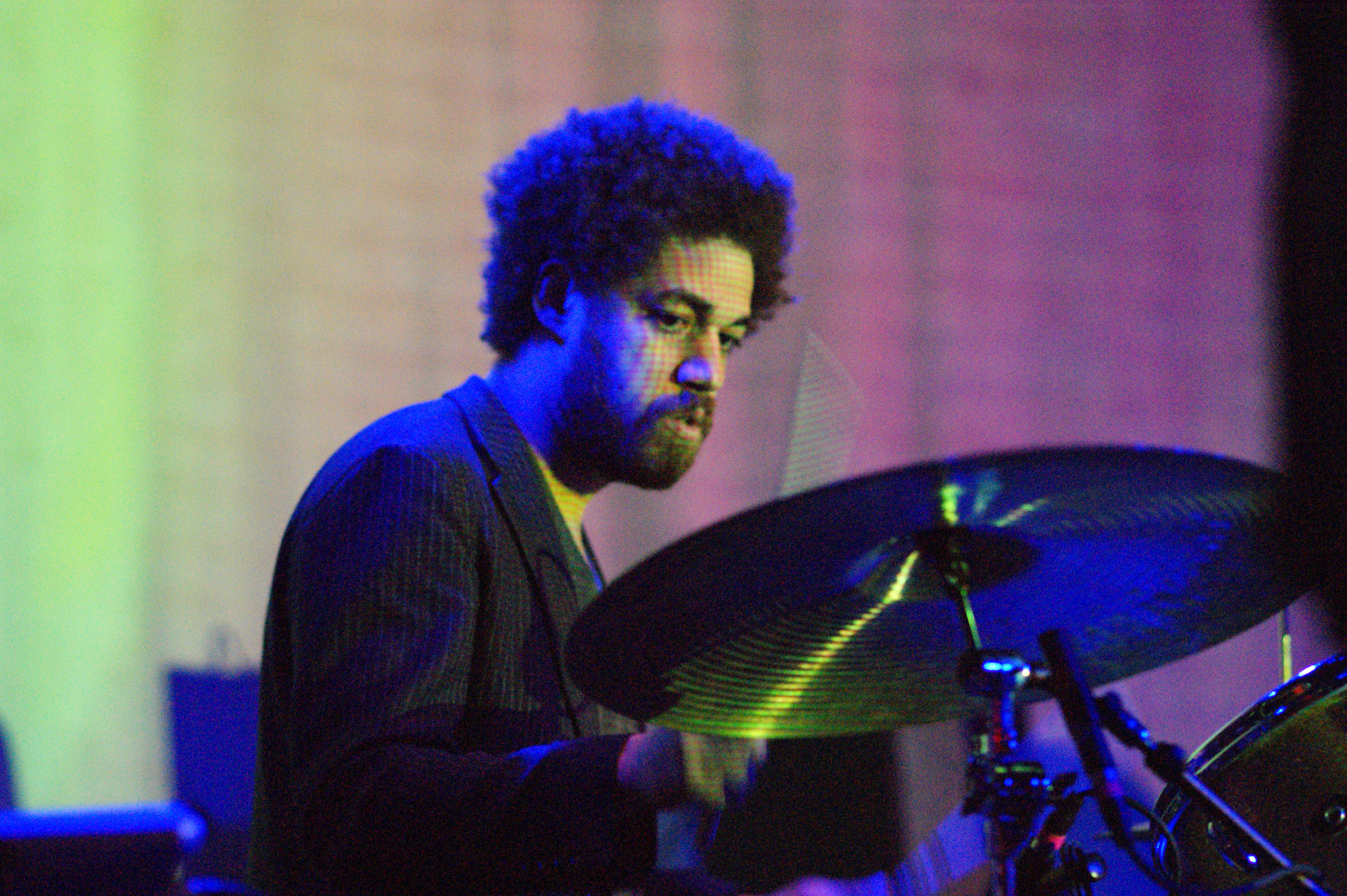
Danger Mouse co-produced the record and contributed as an equal songwriter with the band.

The band hired Danger Mouse to co-produce the record with them, based on their experience with him producing their 2008 album Attack & Release and the single "Tighten Up". Danger Mouse served as co-writer for all of the songs on El Camino. Speaking of their willingness to involve him in the songwriting process, Carney said, "It took us a long time to be able to trust somebody like that, and not be arrogant little kids about it." Auerbach said, "It was difficult at times. Some days it worked great. Some days it was just infuriating. You gotta lose any kind of insecurity. It was a totally different way of thinking for me."

Recording for El Camino began on March 3, 2011. In contrast to their previous records, the Black Keys entered the studio for their new album without having developed any new material, with the exception of the lyrics to "Little Black Submarines", which Auerbach and Danger Mouse had pre-written. Each day, the band began from scratch and in Auerbach's words, "brainstormed until we had songs and we did a song every two days or so". The material was then refined over several days, and after arrangements were agreed upon, the group quickly finished recording the songs, often in just one or two takes. Each song was recorded in a live take of guitar and drums before overdubs were added. This was done to give the music what Auerbach called "that human element, that live feel". Similarly, the group eschewed playing to a click track, despite a tendency to speed up during choruses, to keep a natural feel in the performance. "Dead and Gone" was the first song to be completed.

The band recorded using a Quad-8 mixing console that was first installed in Nashville's Creative Workshop studio in 1969 and later bought by Auerbach from a man in North Carolina. During the sessions, the band listened to playback of their progress on a speaker they purchased from Muscle Shoals Sound Studio after the last day of recording Brothers. Guitar and drums tracks were recorded in the studio's "live room", while vocals were recorded in the control room. The studio's bathrooms served as an echo chamber for recording vocals and handclaps.

For the first time, the band deliberated over the musical details of each song. Auerbach said, "we were getting into the nuances of each song by asking ourselves, 'How long should this intro be? How long should the pre-chorus be? Should there even be a pre-chorus?' We were playing with tempos and BPMs, seeing how a vocal hook does or doesn't work at a faster speed. And usually, we went with the faster option." Differing from the band's lyrics-first approach on Brothers, the lyrics for El Camino were written after the music, often being improvised at the microphone. Explaining their focus on melody, Auerbach said, "the words had to fit in this pre-existing space. It was really confining and totally different from anything I'd done before."

The sessions for El Camino lasted through May 26, 2011, and overall, the band spent 41 days recording, the longest time spent on any of their albums. Mixing and mastering were completed in mid-June.

== Composition ==
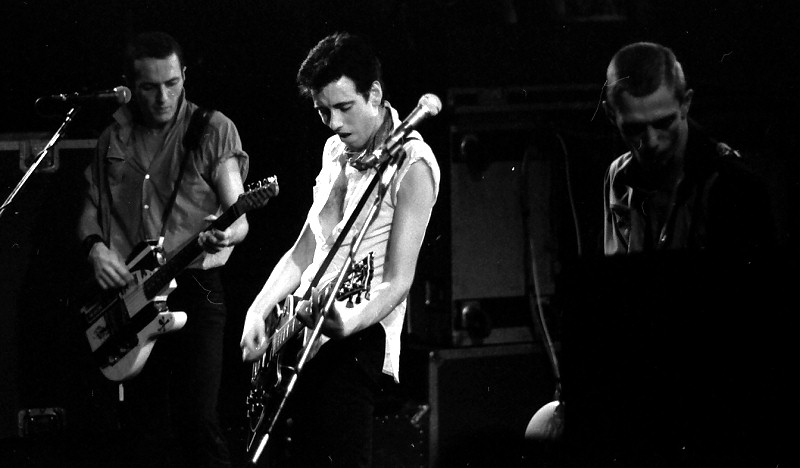
The Clash were one of the groups cited by the Black Keys as a musical influence on El Camino.

El Camino follows the Black Keys' garage rock style but places less emphasis on blues than the group's previous records. The album instead draws more influence from other popular genres from the 1950s to the 1970s, including rock and roll, glam rock, rockabilly, surf rock and soul. Carney explained the album's direction, "After the first three or four songs were recorded, it kind of became apparent that they're all rooted in this early rock and roll feel. It was around that time that we decided to make a whole album that was built around that." The band cited several older musical acts as musical influences on the album, including the Clash, the Cramps, T. Rex, Johnny Burnette, Ramones, the Beatles, Sweet, and the Cars. Following the sonic expansion on their previous two albums, Attack & Release and Brothers, for El Camino they sought to strip-down their sound by writing an album of "efficient rock-and-roll songs and minimal instrumentation".

In contrast to some of the slower, quieter tracks from Brothers, the songs on El Camino are more uptempo and employ more hooks and guitar riffs. During the tour for Brothers, the Black Keys realized that many of that album's songs were too slow to effectively translate to a live setting, leading them to write more fast-paced material for El Camino. Carney said, "This record stemmed from that, the fact that it's easier for our songs to come across well live if they are fast. So we were just trying to make a guitar rock album that was more upbeat than anything we've ever recorded." Realizing halfway through the recording sessions that all the songs they had written to that point were uptempo, the group decided to maintain the faster pace as a common thread throughout the album.

== Packaging and title ==
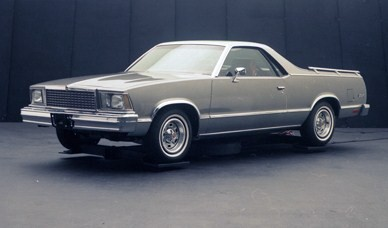

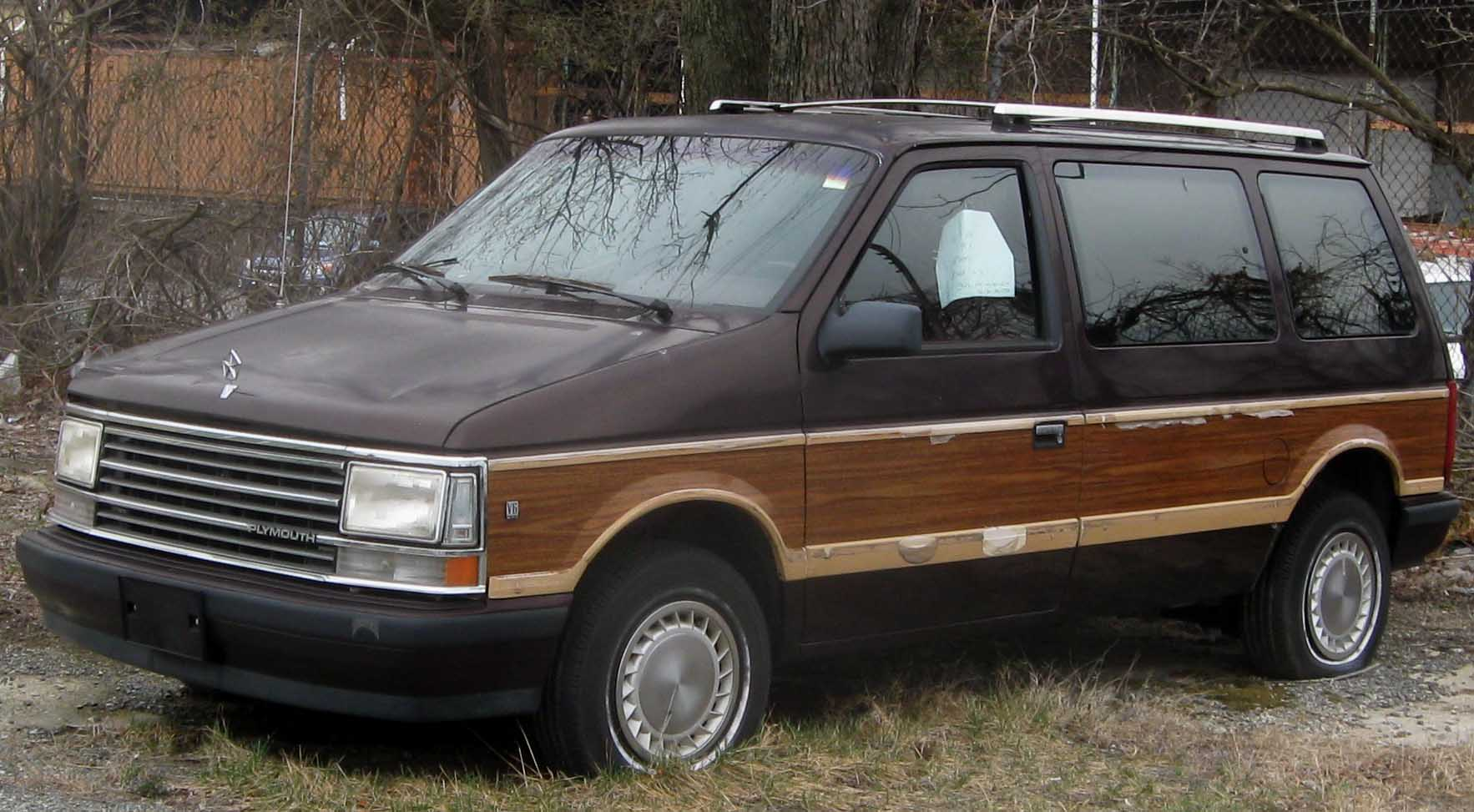
The vehicle on the cover is not the album's namesake, a Chevrolet El Camino (top), but rather a Plymouth Voyager (bottom) similar to the one the duo used to tour in.

The album was named after the Chevrolet El Camino, a coupé utility car. The inspiration came from the band sighting an El Camino while on tour in Canada in 2010; Carney admitted that the title was selected "as a joke". "El camino" is Spanish for "the road" or "the path". The band found out the phrase's meaning after selecting it as an album title, and they joked about the record taking on deeper meaning afterwards. Andy Gill of The Independent said of the title, "it's a nod to the pilgrimage of dues-paying, the months of one-night-stands in tiny Midwest towns which hone raw talent into rock'n'roll gold." Michael Carney, the duo's art director and Patrick's brother, was initially hesitant about the title. Patrick recounted the conversation with his brother about selecting the title and artwork:

I told my brother the idea and my brother was like, "You know, if you name the record El Camino, everybody's going to think of the car the El Camino." And I was like, "Yeah exactly. That's the fucking point!" And he was like, "OK, but why don't we just put a car on the cover that's not an El Camino?" And I said, "OK, what kind of car?" He says, "Just put the first car you guys ever toured in on the cover."

The vehicle in the cover image is a Plymouth Voyager similar to the navy blue one that the group toured in for the first year and a half of their career. Commenting on the puzzled reaction the group received to putting an image of a used van on the cover of an album named for a muscle car, Michael said, "That's the reaction we were going for. It didn't work in Europe because they don't know what an El Camino is over there, so it made perfect sense to them." Patrick compared the appearance of Akron to the cover image, calling his hometown "A busted up parking lot with a busted up car." The interior sleeve booklet for the album features images of various vans from Akron, Ohio, including those produced under the brands Ford, Chevrolet, Chrysler, and Dodge. Each copy of the album bears a sticker on the exterior that says "Play loud".

== Release ==
=== Promotion ===
Prior to the release of El Camino, promotional copies were limited to a small pressing of just 50, given mostly to music labels and the Black Keys' manager. Preview listens for journalists were strictly controlled to only one-time listens and they were held within the duo's manager's office, an uncommon practice within the music industry. The group opted to not put the record on music streaming services, citing financial reasons. Patrick Carney said that streaming services are not yet "at a point where you're able to replace royalties from record sales with the royalties from streams. For a band that makes a living selling music, it's not at a point where it's feasible for us." As is common practice for the band, several songs from the album were licensed for use in popular media, including ESPN's Band of the Month for December, Lifetime's TV drama Army Wives, and the video game MLB 12: The Show. The group noted though that they were planning to reduce the amount of licensing in comparison to previous records to avoid overexposure. Carney said, "When no one's buying your records, it's easy to justify selling a song. But once you start selling records, you can't really justify having two songs in Cadillac commercials. It looks greedy."

According to Michael Carney, the promotional strategy for the album embraces "the spirit of doing it the wrong way". Warner Bros. Records COO Livia Tortella elaborated that "They've latched onto that idea at a time when the real spirit of alternative has, in many ways, gone away from our music. The spirit of rock should be that: outside of the norm, not just mainstream and predictable." The music video originally shot for their lead single "Lonely Boy" employed a big budget and several people, but the band decided instead to release a one-shot video consisting solely of footage of an extra–actor and part-time security guard Derrick Tuggle–dancing. The video went viral, garnering more than 400,000 views on YouTube in 24 hours. On October 9, 2011, the band placed an ad in the Akron Beacon Journal advertising their used tour van as a "1994 El Camino" for sale. The ad read, "1994 El Camino: 273,000 mi. 200 cubic-in. 3.3L 95hp V-6 engine, 3-speed turbo autom shift, sapphire stylus, some ticks/pops, light surface noise. Working AM/FM radio, tan metalflake/woodie panels, some rust. Black vinyl seats. Priced to sell – Grab the Keys and go! Contact Pat or Dan at (330) 510–1206." The phone number in the ad led to a recorded message of Patrick Carney describing the car and asking for the caller to leave a message. The band launched the promotional website WannaBuyAVan.com with a video parodying a low-budget used car commercial for the same van. Actor/comedian Bob Odenkirk plays the salesman in the video trying to pass off the van as an El Camino.

The album's release date of December 6, 2011, contrasts with the conventional record release strategy within the music industry. Carney said, "There's a rule you release albums in February–March, then you tour the summer. Then there's the September–October schedule. Our new album is out on December 6. I asked the label for a list of major rock bands that had released albums in December. In the last 10 years there's maybe four. But our manager said it's a shame more bands don't, 'cos it would force the industry not to shut down." The group had intended to release El Camino in September but decided to push it until December to allow for a three-month break. Ultimately, they booked this free time up with additional concerts and a promotional tour.

A week prior to the release date, the duo decided to stream five tracks from El Camino on their website after the album leaked online. The Black Keys appeared as the musical guest on Saturday Night Live on December 3, 2011, for the second time that year, and they performed "Lonely Boy" and "Gold on the Ceiling". Two days later, the group held an album release concert at Webster Hall in New York City that was streamed live on MTVHive.com. The group made several appearances on late-night talk shows, including Late Show with David Letterman and The Colbert Report, as well as at the 2011 Spike Video Game Awards. The group was the subject of a cover story in Rolling Stone for their issue dated January 19, 2012; in a widely publicized quote, Carney criticized Canadian rock band Nickelback, saying that "rock and roll is dying because people became OK with Nickelback being the biggest band in the world".

=== Singles ===
"Lonely Boy" was released as the album's lead single on October 26, 2011, and became one of the group's most successful singles. It topped several rock radio charts, including the Alternative Songs and Rock Songs charts in the US, and the Alternative Rock and Active Rock charts in Canada. On the singles charts, "Lonely Boy" was the group's highest-charting song in several countries, peaking at number 64 on the Billboard Hot 100, number 2 on the Australian Singles Chart, and number 33 on the Canadian Hot 100. "Lonely Boy" was certified nine-times platinum in Canada, triple-platinum in Australia, platinum in New Zealand, and gold in Denmark. "Gold on the Ceiling" was released as the album's second single, and like its predecessor, it topped the US Alternative Songs chart and the Canadian Alternative Rock and Active Rock charts. On the singles charts, the song reached number 94 on the Hot 100, number 34 on the Australian Singles Chart, and number 51 on the Canadian Hot 100. The song was certified platinum in Australia and Canada. "Dead and Gone" was released as a third single in Europe, while "Run Right Back" was released as a fourth single in the United Kingdom. "Little Black Submarines" was released as the record's fifth single on October 8, 2012, and was a rock radio success; it peaked at number two on the US Alternative Songs chart and the Canadian Alternative Rock and Active Rock charts, as well as number 54 on the Canadian Hot 100.

=== 10th anniversary edition ===
On November 5, 2021, a 10th anniversary edition of El Camino was released. It includes a remastered copy of album and four bonus CDs with live performances. Discs 2 and 3 are from a concert in Portland, Maine, and Disc 4 is from a BBC recording session. Disc 5 contains an Electro Vox session, but it is not included in the CD or vinyl release, only digital download copies from the label's website.

== Reception ==
=== Critical reaction ===
Professional ratings
Aggregate scores
Source	Rating
AnyDecentMusic?	7.8/10
Metacritic	84/100
Review scores
Source	Rating
AllMusic	4/5 stars
The A.V. Club	B
The Daily Telegraph	4/5 stars
Entertainment Weekly	A−
The Guardian	5/5 stars
Los Angeles Times	4/4 stars
NME	7/10
Pitchfork	7.4/10
Rolling Stone	4/5 stars
Spin	8/10

El Camino received acclaim from music critics. According to review aggregator website Metacritic, the album received an average review score of 84/100 based on 37 reviews, indicating "Universal acclaim". Critics mainly praised the instrumentation of the songs on the album, as well as the album production. Spin gave the record an 8/10 rating, calling it "irresistibly gaudy" and "catchier, glitzier, ballsier". The reviewer said the songs contain "classic cock-rock sonic tchotchkes: handclaps, talk-box guitar breaks, rainbow keyboards. The overall effect is something akin to ZZ Top with glitter in their beards." Melissa Maerz of Entertainment Weekly gave the record an "A−", writing that the group "make a small-room racket that sounds massive enough for a bigger-is-better world". Maerz said that "El Camino trades the soulful stylings of Brothers for harder-driving, faster-riffing rock & roll". James Lachno of The Daily Telegraph rated the album four-stars-out-of-five, praising Danger Mouse for "sharpen[ing] up the sweet, melodic choruses that offset the duo's unholy racket" and give each song a "timeless quality, as suited to a Seventies mid-west saloon as a students' indie disco". Despite what Lachno judged to be "tawdry" lyrics, he said that "the Black Keys are here to rock, not talk. On this evidence, few bands right now do it better." Randall Roberts of the Los Angeles Times assigned the album a maximum four-star rating, calling it "butt-shaking music" and "an album with lyrics that are both unpretentious and un-dumb". Roberts praised the nostalgic elements of the group's music and said that the album "scratches an itch you didn't even know you had".

Michael Hann of The Guardian gave the record a maximum rating of five stars, writing that it is "dripping with an easy, attractive confidence". Commenting on the various musical influences on the album, Hann said, "they stride fearlessly into areas that might once have been off-limits". His review concluded, "They sound like a band who think they've made the year's best rock'n'roll album, probably because that's exactly what they've done." Rob Harvilla of Pitchfork scored El Camino a 7.4/10 and called it "their best and (not coincidentally) goofiest album". Describing the music, he said, "The riffs are glam-nasty, the lyrics sublimely knuckleheaded, the basslines nimble and bombastic, the mood frivolous and fun and unabashedly corny." Will Hermes of Rolling Stone rated the album four stars and called it their "grandest pop gesture yet, augmenting dark-hearted fuzz blasts with sleekly sexy choruses and Seventies-glam flair". AllMusic writer Stephen Thomas Erlewine rated the album four stars and said, "More than any other Black Keys album, El Camino is an outright party, playing like a collection of 11 lost 45 singles, each one having a bigger beat or dirtier hook than the previous side." Kitty Empire of The Observer was more critical of the album; in a three-star review, Empire commented that it sounded like Danger Mouse "tightened up the Black Keys' act rather than loosened it" and that "El Camino may be fast and fun, but it is also somewhat undemanding." The reviewer noted that the album had "increased vigour", but that it came at the expense of "the subtleties that made Brothers such an intriguing ride."

=== Commercial performance ===
In the US, El Camino debuted at number two on the Billboard 200 and sold 206,000 copies in its first week on sale. This marks the highest single-week album sales and, to that point, charting position that the group had achieved in the country. In Canada, the album debuted at number three on the Canadian Albums Chart and sold 27,000 copies in its first week. In its first two weeks on sale, El Camino sold nearly 293,000 copies in the US. The album has been certified: six-times platinum in Canada; quadruple-platinum in New Zealand; double-platinum in Australia and the U.S platinum in the United Kingdom, France, and Ireland; and gold in Belgium and the Netherlands. As of April 2014, the album has sold 1.4 million copies in the United States.

=== Accolades ===
El Camino appeared on several end-of-year rankings by music publications and critics. The album was ranked by Mojo as the sixth-best album of 2012, even though it was released in 2011. American Songwriter ranked it as the ninth-best album of 2011, while Rolling Stone ranked it as the 12th-best. The album placed 21st on the "Best Albums" list from The Village Voice's 2011 Pazz & Jop critics' poll. Paste ranked the record as the 22nd-best of the year before it had been released. Spin placed it at number 36 on its list of the 50 best albums of the year, writing, "Glam-blooze guitar, poppy melodies, and hockey-rink keyboards fit the Keys like vintage denim." Claire Suddath of Time magazine and Andrew Leahey of The Washington Times both named El Camino one of the Top 10 Albums of 2011, while the staff of AllMusic selected the album as one of their favorites of the year. In end-of-year polls, writers for Rolling Stone selected "Little Black Submarines" as the 18th-best song of 2011, while the publication's readers voted "Lonely Boy" the year's third-best song.

At the 55th Annual Grammy Awards, The Black Keys won the award for Best Rock Album for El Camino, and Best Rock Performance and Best Rock Song for "Lonely Boy". Auerbach was honored as Producer of the Year, Non-Classical for co-producing El Camino and producing records by Hacienda and Dr. John. The Black Keys also received nominations for Album of the Year for El Camino and Record of the Year for "Lonely Boy".

== Tour ==
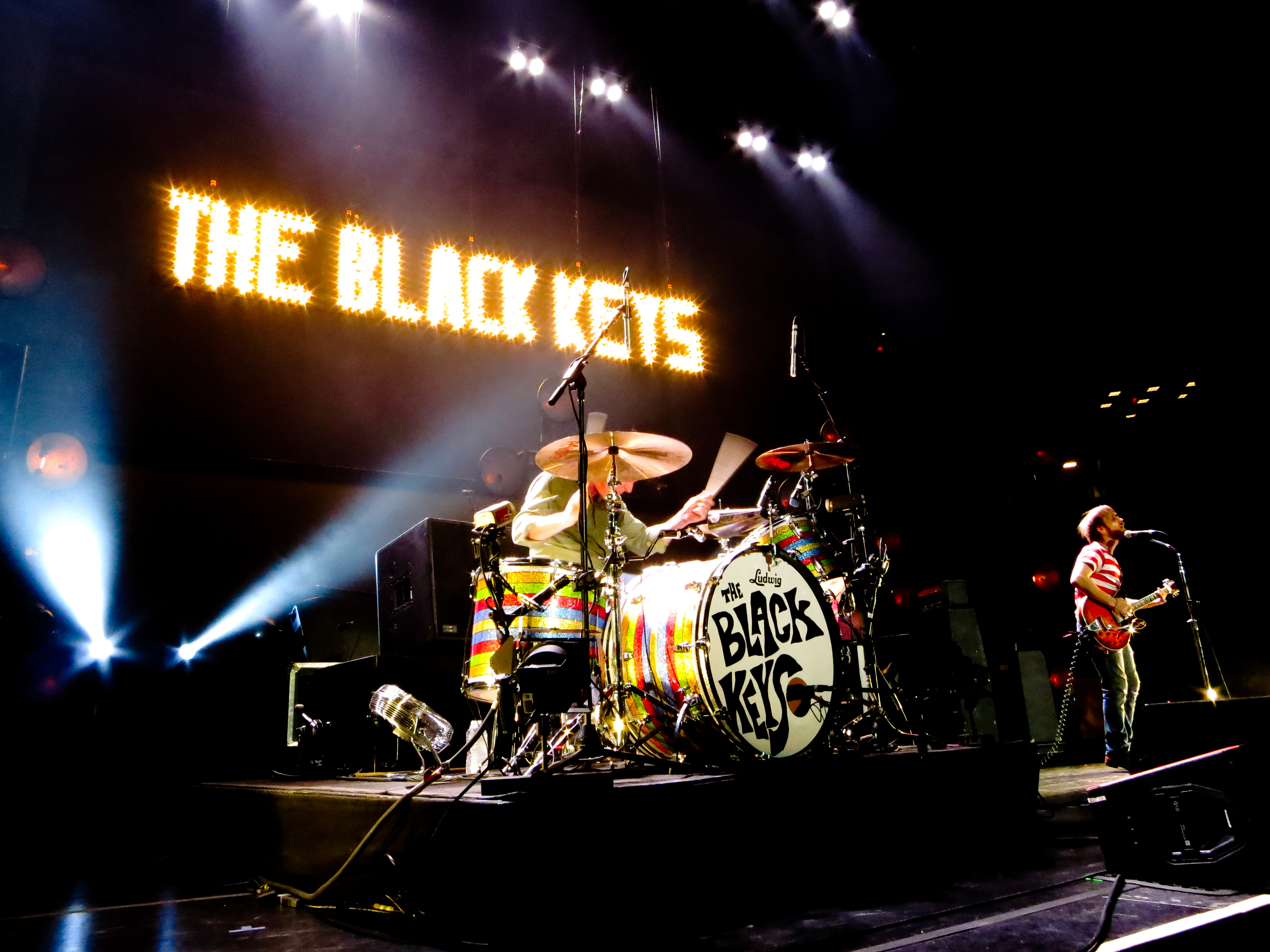
The Black Keys performing at Madison Square Garden in March 2012

In December 2011, The Black Keys announced a 2012 concert tour, their first playing arenas as a headlining act. The tour opened in Europe on January 23, 2012, with three weeks of shows, before visiting North America from March to May. The tour made multiple return visits to Europe and North America throughout the year, while also visiting Australasia from October through November. In total, the group played 112 shows in 2012. Among the support acts that accompanied the band were Band of Skulls, Arctic Monkeys, and Tegan and Sara. After tickets went on sale, The Black Keys' concert at Madison Square Garden in New York City sold out in 15 minutes, resulting in the addition of a second date at the venue to satisfy demand. The tour grossed $12.7 million in 2012, and after 129 shows, it ended on July 13, 2013.

Just as it did on its previous tour, the group added bassist Gus Seyffert and keyboardist/guitarist John Wood as touring musicians in order to perform songs as close to their studio arrangements as possible. Auerbach explained the decision for the expanded live band: "It wasn't about the size of the venue. It was just that we could afford to do it and our songs deserved it. We wanted to finally present the songs like we'd written them." During the middle portion of each concert, Auerbach and Carney played older material as a duo without the backing musicians. Many critics singled these performances out as the shows' highlights.

The concert stage used a setup with a lighting system and video projections designed by Karl Lemieux. The lighting comprised four banks of on-stage vintage spotlights, along with two disco balls and a lighted sign bearing the band's name that were lowered for the encores. Lemieux's video, which was projected onto a white sheet at the stage's rear, incorporated black-and-white footage of junkyards, deserts, and open highways. Carney explained that the band was aiming for a retro aesthetic, saying, "We kind of wanted to make the whole stage look like an old-school rock 'n' roll show, as much as possible. We're referencing bands in the '70s, what they were doing when they were playing arenas." Moreover, the footage was meant to pay homage to the group's origins. Auerbach said, "We wanted it to represent our music and the Midwest where we're from, the Rust Belt and open spaces. We find that stuff beautiful and uplifting."

== Track listing ==
All tracks are written by Dan Auerbach, Patrick Carney, and Danger Mouse.

No.	Title	Length
1.	"Lonely Boy"	3:13
2.	"Dead and Gone"	3:41
3.	"Gold on the Ceiling"	3:44
4.	"Little Black Submarines"	4:11
5.	"Money Maker"	2:57
6.	"Run Right Back"	3:17
7.	"Sister"	3:25
8.	"Hell of a Season"	3:45
9.	"Stop Stop"	3:30
10.	"Nova Baby"	3:27
11.	"Mind Eraser"	3:15
Total length:		38:18

== Personnel ==
The Black Keys

- Dan Auerbach – vocals, guitars
- Patrick Carney – drums

Additional performers

- Danger Mouse – keyboards
- Leisa Hans – vocals
- Heather Rigdon – vocals
- Ashley Wilcoxson – vocals

Production

- Danger Mouse (Brian Burton) – production
- The Black Keys – production
- Kennie Takahashi – engineering
- Collin Dupuis – engineering assistance
- Tchad Blake – mixing
- Tom Elmhirst – mixing for "Lonely Boy"
- Ben Baptie – mixing assistance for "Lonely Boy"
- Brian Lucey – mastering

== Charts ==
=== Weekly charts ===
Chart (2011–21)	Peak position
Australian Albums (ARIA)	3
Austrian Albums (Ö3 Austria)	52
Belgian Albums (Ultratop Flanders)	3
Belgian Albums (Ultratop Wallonia)	24
Canadian Albums (Billboard)	3
Danish Albums (Hitlisten)	16
Dutch Albums (Album Top 100)	10
Finnish Albums (Suomen virallinen lista)	18
French Albums (SNEP)	21
German Albums (Offizielle Top 100)	27
Hungarian Albums (MAHASZ)	29
Italian Albums (FIMI)	29
Mexican Albums (Top 100 Mexico)	86
New Zealand Albums (RMNZ)	2
Norwegian Albums (VG-lista)	11
Portuguese Albums (AFP)	9
Scottish Albums (Official Charts)	5
Spanish Albums (Promusicae)	7
Swedish Albums (Sverigetopplistan)	44
Swiss Albums (Schweizer Hitparade)	18
UK Albums (Official Charts)	6
US Billboard 200	2

=== Year-end charts ===
Chart (2011)	Position
Australian Albums (ARIA)	66

Chart (2012)	Position
Australian Albums (ARIA)	11
Belgian Albums (Wallonia)	82
Canadian Albums (Billboard)	11
Dutch Albums (Album Top 100)	36
Italian Albums (FIMI)	87
New Zealand Albums (RMNZ)	4
Swiss Albums (Schweizer Hitparade)	99
UK Albums (OCC)	38
US Billboard 200	10
US Alternative Albums (Billboard)	2
US Rock Albums (Billboard)	2

Chart (2013)	Position
Australian Albums (ARIA)	79
Spanish Albums (PROMUSICAE)	44
US Billboard 200	79

=== Decade-end charts ===
Chart (2010–2019)	Position
Australian Albums (ARIA)	37
US Billboard 200	102
US Top Rock Albums (Billboard)	18

== Certifications ==
Region	Certification	Certified units/sales
Australia (ARIA)	2× Platinum	140,000^{^}
Belgium (BRMA)	Gold	15,000^{*}
Canada (Music Canada)	6× Platinum	480,000^{‡}
Denmark (IFPI Danmark)	Gold	10,000^{‡}
France (SNEP)	Platinum	100,000^{*}
Ireland (IRMA)	Platinum	15,000^{^}
Italy (FIMI)	Platinum	50,000^{‡}
Netherlands (NVPI)	Gold	25,000^{^}
New Zealand (RMNZ)	4× Platinum	60,000^{‡}
Norway (IFPI Norway)	Gold	10,000^{‡}
Spain (Promusicae)	Gold	20,000^{^}
United Kingdom (BPI)	Platinum	300,000^{^}
United States (RIAA)	2× Platinum	2,000,000^{‡}
^{*} Sales figures based on certification alone.^{^} Shipments figures based on certification alone.^{‡} Sales+streaming figures based on certification alone.
