= Magic Potion (album) =

Studio album by The Black Keys
- Released: September 12, 2006
- Recorded: The Audio Eagle Nest (Akron, OH)
- Genres: Blues rock; garage rock
- Length: 40:55
- Label: Nonesuch
- Producer: The Black Keys

The Black Keys chronology
Live in Austin, TX (2006)	Magic Potion (2006)	Attack & Release (2008)

Singles from Magic Potion
- 1. "Your Touch" Released: October 2, 2006; 2. "You're the One" Released: February 26, 2007; 3. "Just Got to Be" Released: August 6, 2007

Professional ratings
Aggregate scores
Source	Rating
Metacritic	69/100
Review scores
Source	Rating
AllMusic	4/5 stars
The A.V. Club	B
Entertainment Weekly	A−
Mojo	3/5 stars
NME	6/10
Pitchfork	6.0/10
Q	2/5 stars
Rolling Stone	3.5/5 stars
Slant Magazine	4.5/5 stars
Spin	3/5 stars

Magic Potion is the fourth studio album by American rock duo the Black Keys. It was released in 2006 and was their first record released on Nonesuch Records, the band's current label. This album marks the first time they wrote and composed entirely original material, unlike on previous albums and EPs.

== Recording ==
Like the group's first two albums, Magic Potion was recorded in the basement of drummer Patrick Carney; in his estimation, the record was made using "$5,000 worth of crappy equipment". The group's guitarist Dan Auerbach explained the decision behind the recording location:

We like the sound of odd rooms. It's got concrete floors and walls. The upstairs floor is the ceiling. The mixing desk and computer are on top of the tool desk built by the old guy who used to live there. You can hear all of that. Lots of new records have no individuality to the sound. I wanted it to sound like a band in the basement of a house in the Midwest.

Carney expressed disappointment in the quality of the finished record:

We paid $350 to get it mastered, took it home and there was, like, no bass on it. And we just dropped it in a FedEx envelope, mailed it to Warner Brothers and were done with it. Of all things that we've ever done, that's my biggest regret—is that we just kind of were like, "Oh, OK."

== Cover art ==
The cover art depicts a Fabergé egg. Inside the album is a picture of a fried egg. The back cover depicts a falcon.

== Track listing ==
All tracks are written by Dan Auerbach and Patrick Carney.

No.	Title	Length
1.	"Just Got to Be"	3:01
2.	"Your Touch"	2:45
3.	"You're the One"	3:29
4.	"Just a Little Heat"	3:42
5.	"Give Your Heart Away"	3:27
6.	"Strange Desire"	4:22
7.	"Modern Times"	4:22
8.	"The Flame"	4:36
9.	"Goodbye Babylon"	5:56
10.	"Black Door"	3:31
11.	"Elevator"	3:44

== Personnel ==
- Dan Auerbach – guitar, 12 string guitar, slide guitar, lap steel, vocals
- Patrick Carney – drums, percussion

== Charts ==
Chart (2006)	Peak position
Australian Albums (ARIA)	27
Belgian Albums (Ultratop Flanders)	99
French Albums (SNEP)	109
Scottish Albums (Official Charts)	77
UK Albums (Official Charts)	79
US Billboard 200	95

== Certifications ==
Certifications for Magic Potion
Region	Certification	Certified units/sales
Canada (Music Canada)	Gold	50,000^{‡}
United Kingdom (BPI)	Silver	60,000^{‡}
^{‡} Sales+streaming figures based on certification alone.
