= Just Got to Be =

Single by The Black Keys

from the album Magic Potion
- B-side: "Black Door"
- Released: August 6, 2007
- Recorded: Akron, Ohio
- Genre: Garage rock; blues rock
- Length: 3:00
- Label: V2
- Songwriters: Dan Auerbach; Patrick Carney
- Producer: The Black Keys

The Black Keys singles chronology
"You're the One" (2007)	"Just Got to Be" (2007)	"Strange Times" (2008)

"Just Got to Be" is a single by American rock band The Black Keys from the album Magic Potion. It was released on August 6, 2007. It was featured on the soundtrack of the 2007 video game NHL 08, and used in the AT&T commercial "Stage Presence" for the Windows Phone.

== Music video ==
The music video for "Just Got to Be" was directed by Peter Zavadil. It shows Patrick Carney and Dan Auerbach performing on a stage in the Akron Italian Center without an audience.

== Track listing ==
Written by Dan Auerbach and Patrick Carney.

1. "Just Got to Be"
2. "Black Door"

== Personnel ==
- Patrick Carney – drums
- Dan Auerbach – guitars, vocals
