= HotChaCha =

American art punk band

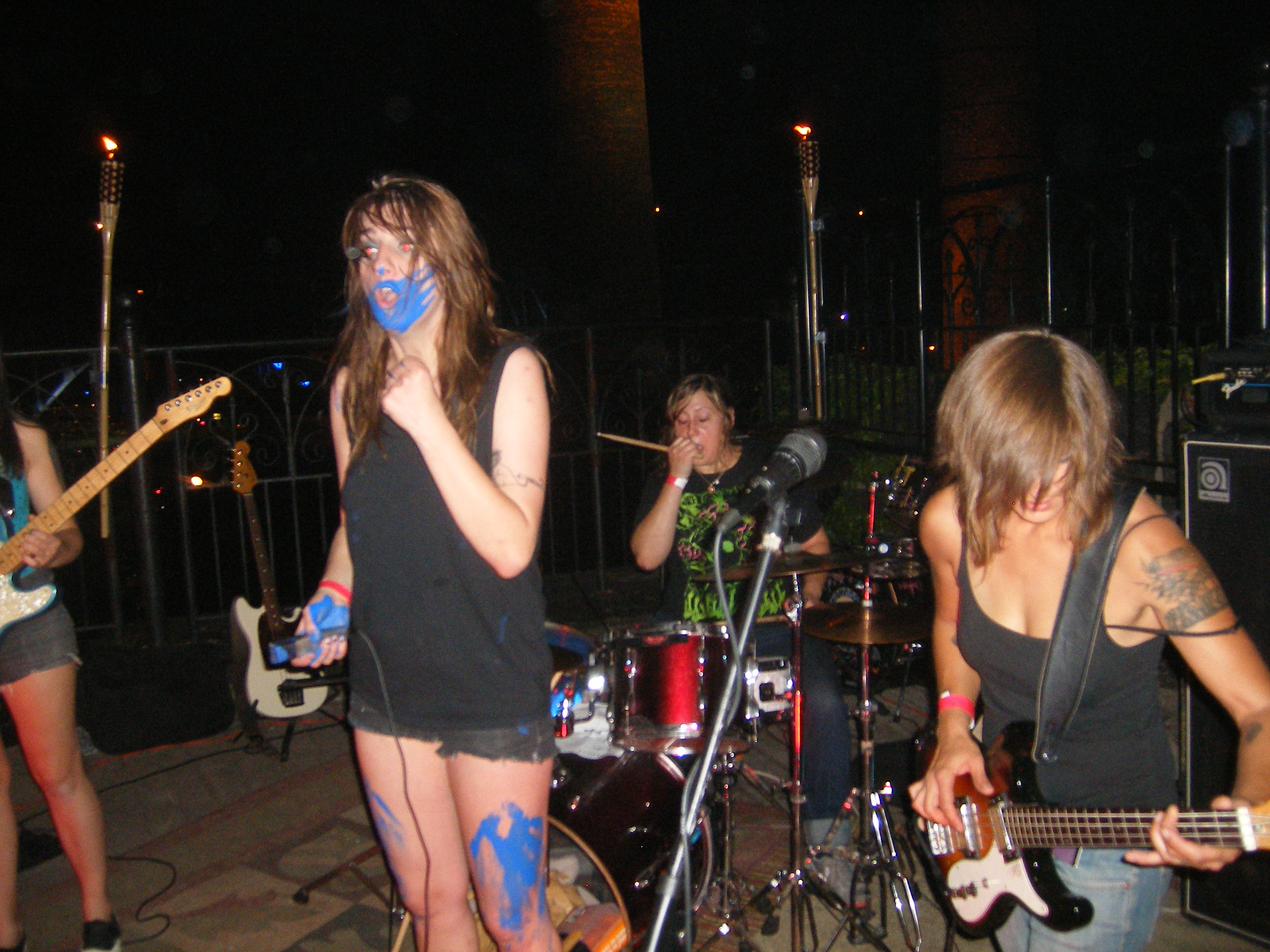

Background information
- Origin: Cleveland, Ohio, United States
- Genres: Art punk; noise pop; shoegazing; experimental; post-punk revival
- Years active: 2007–present
- Label: Exit Stencil Recordings
- Members: Jovana Batkovic, Greg Gebhard, Roseanna Safos
- Past members: Lisa Paulovcin, Heather Gmucs, Mandy Aramouni
- Website: HotChaCha

HotChaCha was an American, Cleveland, Ohio-based art punk, band composed of Jovana Batkovic (vocals), Greg Gebhard (guitar/keyboard) and Roseanna Safos (drums). The band does not have a permanent bassist, but utilizes fill-in bassists on tour. The band plays a progressive rock influenced by a blend of shoegaze and punk.

== History ==
=== Formation ===
HotChaCha formed in 2007 when Jovana Batkovic and Mandy Aramouni decided to start a band over coffee at the West Side Market, and later enlisted Lisa Paulovcin to play drums. Prior to the formation of the band, Jovana Batkovic had a career in theater as a regional actress. Batkovic had a minor role in the music video for the 2006 single, "Your Touch" by The Black Keys. HotChaCha played their first show at Pat's in the Flats in 2007 as part of a benefit for the Cleveland Rape Crisis Center. After seeing the show, Heather Gmucs expressed interest in playing bass and joined the band.

=== Live performances and reception ===
The members of HotChaCha had no expectations of fame, but their confidence increased after positive audience reception in Cleveland and beyond. Jovana Batkovic brings a theatrical element to her performance and the band was named a "band to watch" in 2009 by Scene Magazine. They often struggle with the "Girl Group" label, but critics have come to their defense and question if the label is even necessary.

=== Rifle, I Knew You When You Were Just a Pistol (EP) ===
The debut release on Exit Stencil Recordings in 2008 featured four multi-lingual tracks. The EP received positive reviews, including CMJ. After the release of their EP, they went on to perform in the Summer Sessions Concert Series at the Rock and Roll Hall of Fame, 2008 Ingenuity Festival, 2008 MidPoint Music Festival, and 2008 CMJ Music Marathon.

=== The World's Hardest Working Telescope and the Violent Birth of Stars (CD/LP) ===
Roseanna Safos replaced Lisa Paulovicin on drums just prior to the release of the album. The release party at the Grog Shop in Cleveland's Coventry Village also featured the release of a music video for the single "Ticket Away From Prague" filmed by cinema photographer Noel Maitland.

=== Naturally Proper (Cassette Tape) ===
HotChaCha began working on new material immediately after their debut album release. During this time they began a touring relationship with the band We are Hex from Indianapolis. In anticipation of their touring together, they released a split cassette titled "Naturally Proper". The HotChaCha live demo recordings for the cassette were done at the home studio of Justin Coulter of the band Roue in Cleveland.

=== Fantastic Static (EP) ===
The studio recordings for the "Fantastic Static" (EP) were done at the home studios of We are Hex in Indianapolis, and mixed by We are Hex drummer, Brandon Beaver. They began selling the EP at a live show with The Breeders on September 2, 2010. HotChaCha continued touring, and were featured performers at CMJ Music Marathon 2010 and Ingenuity Festival 2010. Founding member, Heather Gmucs (bass), left the band to pursue a career at Gotta Groove Records pressing vinyl records.

=== Do It (Split LP) ===
After the departure of Heather Gmucs, Greg Gebhard was chosen as a replacement after open auditions in early 2011. After writing new material, HotChaCha scheduled a three-month tour with Summer People from Syracuse, New York. They released a split LP titled "Do It" on the Exit Stencil Label. The album was noted for its "broad appeal" and "straight forward arty garage rock tracks". After the tour, Mandy Aramouni announced her departure from the band to pursue other interests.

== Discography ==
=== Albums ===
- 2009: The World's Hardest Working Telescope and the Violent Birth of Stars (Exit Stencil)

=== Split albums ===
- 2011: Do It with Summer People (Exit Stencil)

=== EPs ===
- 2008: Rifle, I Knew You When You Were Just a Pistol (Exit Stencil)
- 2010: Fantastic Static (Exit Stencil)

=== Split cassettes ===
- 2010: Naturally Proper with We are Hex (Bitchin' Sounds)

== Videography ==
"It's Hard to be a White Boy in 1992" 2008 "Jaccuse" 2008 "Bob" 2009 "Ticket Away from Prague" 2009 "Traffic" 2010
