= You're the One (The Black Keys song) =

Single by The Black Keys

from the album Magic Potion
- B-side: "The Way I Feel When I'm with You"; "Work Me" (live)
- Released: February 26, 2007
- Recorded: 2006
- Genre: Garage rock; blues rock
- Length: 3:29
- Label: V2
- Songwriters: Dan Auerbach; Patrick Carney
- Producer: Patrick Carney

The Black Keys singles chronology
| "Your Touch" (2006) | "You're the One" (2007) | "Just Got to Be" (2007) |

"You're the One" is a single from The Black Keys, from their album Magic Potion. It was released February 26, 2007 as a digital download by V2 Records.

== Reception ==
Mike Diver, in a review for Drowned in Sound, rated You're the One 7 out of 10, calling it "truly laid-back fare, ideal fodder for just kicking back of a muggy Sunday afternoon and popping the top off a cool beer". Ben Davis of contactmusic.com called the song "pure Lennon", sounding like "I'm So Tired's even more world-weary cousin". You're the One appears on the fifth spot of a list of the Black Keys' best songs by diffuser.fm.

== Track listing ==
1. "You're the One"
2. "The Way I Feel When I'm With You" (outtake)
3. "Work Me" (Live at The Avalon in Boston, November 16, 2005.)

== Personnel ==
- Patrick Carney - drums, producer
- Dan Auerbach - guitars, vocals
