= Gold on the Ceiling =

2012 single by The Black Keys

Single by the Black Keys

from the album El Camino
- Released: February 25, 2012
- Recorded: 2011 at Easy Eye Sound studio in Nashville, Tennessee
- Genre: Garage rock; blues rock; glam rock
- Length: 3:44
- Label: Nonesuch
- Songwriters: Dan Auerbach; Patrick Carney; Brian Burton
- Producers: Danger Mouse; The Black Keys

The Black Keys singles chronology
"Lonely Boy" (2011)	"Gold on the Ceiling" (2012)	"Little Black Submarines" (2012)

Music video
- "Gold on the Ceiling" on YouTube

"Gold on the Ceiling" is the third track from El Camino (2011), the seventh studio album by American rock band the Black Keys. It was released as the record's second single on February 25, 2012. The song was certified platinum in Australia and Canada, and is tied with "Fever" as the band's highest-charting song in the UK.

== Music videos ==
Two videos were shot for the song. The first, directed by Reid Long, features footage from the band's concerts, as well as candid shots of them on tour.

A second music video, directed by Harmony Korine, was shot prior to the single release, but was not released until May 2012. The video features the band members wearing Baby Björns and being carried by giant doppelgängers of theirs, played by two Belmont Bruins men's basketball players.

== Reception ==
Will Hermes of Rolling Stone called the song's keyboards "a serrated organ growl backed up with a SWAT team of hand claps" and cited it as an example of Danger Mouse's prowess as a producer and co-writer. Summarizing the song, Hermes wrote, "It's Sixties bubblegum garage pop writ large, with T. Rex swagger and a guitar freakout that perfectly mirrors the lyrics, a paranoid rant that makes you shiver while you shimmy." John Soeder of The Plain Dealer labeled it one of the album's finest and said that it sounded like a hybrid of Norman Greenbaum's "Spirit in the Sky" and Gary Glitter's "Rock and Roll Part 2".

Harley Brown of Consequence of Sound called the song "bombastic, slightly sleazy" and said that it "best sums up The Black Keys' almost unbelievably consistent musicianship and success". Melissa Maerz of Entertainment Weekly said that the song, "with its swarm-of-bees organs and acid-trip gospel harmonies, could be a lost Nuggets gem". Randall Roberts of the Los Angeles Times, writing about the song's retro stylings, said that it "sounds as if it's existed forever". Sam Richards of NME said that the song's "brilliantly demented cowboy glam holler... is boosted by the band's new trio of female backing singers wailing for all they're worth".

== Use in popular media ==
"Gold on the Ceiling" has been used in various sports productions, including: an advertising campaign for the 2012 NCAA Men's Division I Basketball Tournament nicknamed "Brackets Everywhere"; the theme song for NASCAR: Race Day on SPEED on Fox Sports 1 from 2012 to 2013; during 2012 Summer Olympics broadcasts on NBC Sports honoring the Olympic athletes who had won gold medals; the goal song for the Vancouver Canucks, the Nashville Predators, and the UMass Minutemen ice hockey team.

The song has been used in ads for the TV series Veep, a 2012 United Kingdom advert for the Indian beer Cobra, the theatrical trailer for The Campaign, and in the advertisements for GOLD101.7's Jonesy & Amanda Show.

It is featured in TV shows and films, including NCIS, Suits, MLB 12: The Show, Battleship, Workaholics, Chuck, Point Break (2015), Ocean's 8, and Superstore.

The song was performed live at the 2012 MTV Movie Awards by the band, accompanied on guitar by Johnny Depp.

The song was adopted in Samsung Galaxy S5 TV advertisement.

The song is playable in Guitar Hero Live and as downloadable content for Rocksmith and Rock Band 4.

== Single cover ==
The cover art for the single is a photo of the dilapidated south entrance to the former Kaufmann's/Macy's in Rolling Acres Mall in Akron, Ohio.

== Personnel ==
- Dan Auerbach – vocals, guitar
- Patrick Carney – drums
- Brian Burton – keyboards, bass guitar
- Ashley Wilcoxson and Leisa Hans – backing vocals

== Charts ==
=== Weekly charts ===
Chart (2012)	Peak position
Australia (ARIA)	34
Belgium (Ultratip Bubbling Under Flanders)	2
Belgium (Ultratip Bubbling Under Wallonia)	14
Canada Hot 100 (Billboard)	51
Canada Rock (Billboard)	1
Ireland (IRMA)	45
Scottish Singles Sales (Official Charts)	54
UK Singles (Official Charts)	57
US Billboard Hot 100	94
US Hot Rock & Alternative Songs (Billboard)	2

=== Year-end charts ===
Chart (2012)	Position
US Hot Rock Songs (Billboard)	5

== Certifications ==
Region	Certification	Certified units/sales
Australia (ARIA)	Platinum	70,000^{^}
Canada (Music Canada)	4× Platinum	320,000^{‡}
Italy (FIMI)	Gold	15,000^{‡}
New Zealand (RMNZ)	Platinum	30,000^{‡}
United Kingdom (BPI)	Gold	400,000^{‡}
United States (RIAA)	2× Platinum	2,000,000^{‡}
^{^} Shipments figures based on certification alone.^{‡} Sales+streaming figures based on certification alone.
