= Your Touch =

Single by The Black Keys

from the album Magic Potion
- B-side: "The Breaks" (live)
- Released: 2006
- Recorded: 2006
- Genre: Garage rock; blues rock
- Length: 2:44
- Label: Nonesuch; V2
- Songwriters: Dan Auerbach; Patrick Carney
- Producer: The Black Keys

The Black Keys singles chronology
"'Till I Get My Way/Girl Is On My Mind" (2004)	"Your Touch" (2006)	"You're the One" (2007)

"Your Touch" is a single from The Black Keys' fourth album, Magic Potion.

== Overview ==
Complex and Paste both named "Your Touch" as the Black Keys' seventh-best song.

The song has been featured in the 2009 film Zombieland, HBO series Eastbound and Down, in a trailer for Battleship, and in the "Manic Monday" episode of the HBO series Entourage. It was also used in the 2010 video game Major League Baseball 2K10 as well as in the 2011 video game Driver: San Francisco.

== Track listing ==
EP

1. "Your Touch" – 2:42
2. "Strange Desire" – 4:20
3. "Thickfreakness" (Live in Darwin, Australia) – 3:52

7" and CD single

1. "Your Touch" – 2:42
2. "The Breaks" (Live in Darwin, Australia at Browns Mart April 9, 2006) – 4:11

== Music video ==
The music video, directed by Peter Zavadil, features the band playing on the old W Falor St bridge in front of the former Goodrich rubber factory in Akron, Ohio, where they are shot dead while playing. A boy comes over (played by their manager's stepson, Gavin Smith), and a hand from the bass drum hands him a fabergé egg similar to the one on the cover of the album the song was taken from. When the boy leaves, the ghosts of Dan and Patrick get up and walk away to a diner, where small bits of diegetic dialogue between members of the band's ghosts interrupts the music ("So what do you think about being dead?" "...I don't know, my neck hurts." "At least I died doing what I love. Lip-syncing. I love that shit"). The boy is then shown going around showing people the egg. One of the characters shown the egg is played by regional actress, Jovana Batkovic. Jovana Batkovic would later become the frontwoman for the Cleveland-based band HotChaCha. When the people he meets see the egg, they throw up a chicken egg and die. The boy consults a welder to destroy the egg, but it cannot be destroyed. Later, the members of the band's ghosts comes back to inhabit their dead bodies, which then get up and explode, dying once again. Carney is seen catching Auerbach as they die, screaming "no!"

== Covers ==
The song was covered by Donnie Iris, and it was the only studio recording on his 2009 album Ah! Live!
