= I Got Mine (The Black Keys song) =

Single by The Black Keys

from the album Attack & Release
- Released: June 2008
- Recorded: Suma (Painesville, Ohio)
- Genre: Garage rock, blues rock, psychedelic rock
- Length: 3:58 (album version); 3:11 (radio edit)
- Label: Nonesuch, V2 Records
- Songwriters: Dan Auerbach, Patrick Carney
- Producer: Danger Mouse

The Black Keys singles chronology
"Strange Times" (2008)	"I Got Mine" (2008)	"Same Old Thing" (2008)

"I Got Mine" is the second single from The Black Keys' album Attack & Release. It was released in June 2008. The song was number 23 on Rolling Stone's list of the 100 Best Songs of 2008.

== Critical reception ==
Corey Irwin of Ultimate Classic Rock chose "I Got Mine" as the best song from the album Attack & Release, praising its "earworm chorus and emphatic guitar". Complex Magazine considered it to be the 10th best song by the Black Keys. Both articles highlight the song as a focal point for the band, between their indie rock phase of "unrefined and somewhat coarse sound" and a "much fuller and more realized" music of their rock phase.

== In popular culture ==
The song "I Got Mine" has been used in HBO's sports reality series 24/7: Pacquiao-Hatton as well as background music for the 2009 American League Championship Series. The song is also used as the opening theme music for the CTV/CBS Canadian police drama The Bridge. The song has been performed many times live on television, including the Late Show with David Letterman in April 2008. The band Illinois has been regularly performing this song at shows as part of their setlist. It was also sampled by Ski Beatz on the song "I Got Mines" on the album 24 Hour Karate School. It appears in the films The A-Team, The Watch, Homefront, and Tomorrowland. "I Got Mine" is also featured in the video game Tony Hawk: Ride. I Got Mine has been used while the titles are played in the 2013 movie Homefront.

== Track listing ==
1. "I Got Mine" (Radio Edit)(Auerbach, Carney)
2. "Here I Am I Always Am" (Captain Beefheart; live at Suma Studios, Ohio) (7" vinyl only)
3. "I Got Mine" (Album Version - CD Track 2)(Auerbach, Carney)

== Personnel ==
- Dan Auerbach – vocals, guitars
- Patrick Carney – drums, percussion
- Carla Monday – harmony vocals
- Ralph Carney – jaw harp

== Certifications ==
Certifications for "I Got Mine"
Region	Certification	Certified units/sales
Canada (Music Canada)	Gold	40,000^{‡}
United States (RIAA)	Gold	500,000^{‡}
^{‡} Sales+streaming figures based on certification alone.
