= Strange Times (The Black Keys song) =

Single by The Black Keys

from the album Attack & Release
- Released: March 24, 2008
- Genre: Garage rock; blues rock; psychedelic rock
- Length: 3:10
- Label: Nonesuch; V2
- Songwriter(s): Dan Auerbach; Patrick Carney
- Producer(s): Danger Mouse

The Black Keys singles chronology
"Just Got to Be" (2007)	"Strange Times" (2008)	"I Got Mine" (2008)

"Strange Times" is the first single from The Black Keys' album Attack & Release. It was released March 24, 2008.

The song has been featured in the popular video game Grand Theft Auto IV on the in-game radio station "Radio Broker", and has reached number 40 on US Modern Rock Radio Airplay charts. It is also in the game Nascar 09 and released as part of the band's three-song pack for the Rock Band series.

The song was also used in the promo commercials for the third season of Dexter and though discernibly similar, is not the track heard in the opening credits of Facejacker which is credited to Justin Tracy.

Also, the song is used occasionally as bumper music for American sports talk radio program The Jim Rome Show.

The song also appears in the 2011 video game Driver: San Francisco.

In the last verse, a girl named Sadie is mentioned. It's suggested that this is a reference to Dan Auerbach's young daughter, Sadie Little Auerbach, who was born in 2008.

"Sadie, dry your tears,
I will be the one,
To pull you through the mirror,
Before you come, before you come undone."

== Music video ==
The music video was directed by Lance Bangs and it features Dan and Patrick of The Black Keys playing laser tag against a few unsuspecting teenagers. After a few moments of fighting, the teens come to the realization that Dan and Patrick are using actual lasers to play. The video ends with the teenagers running away from the laser tag attraction, with an explosion erupting out of the exit after they leave (the explosion being caused by a bomb that was planted by the duo).

== Track listing ==
7-inch version

1. "Strange Times"
2. "Something On Your Mind" (Dino Valenti)

== Personnel ==
- Dan Auerbach – vocals, guitar
- Patrick Carney – drums
- Danger Mouse – bass, keyboards
