= Mondial Choral =

Coordinates: 45°36′17″N 73°39′33″W

Mondial Loto-Québec de Laval
- Actual festival logo
- Genre: Multiple (Mostly Choirs and Rock)
- Locations: Laval, Quebec, Canada
- Years active: 2005-
- Website: www.mlql.ca

Previous Logo used until 2011

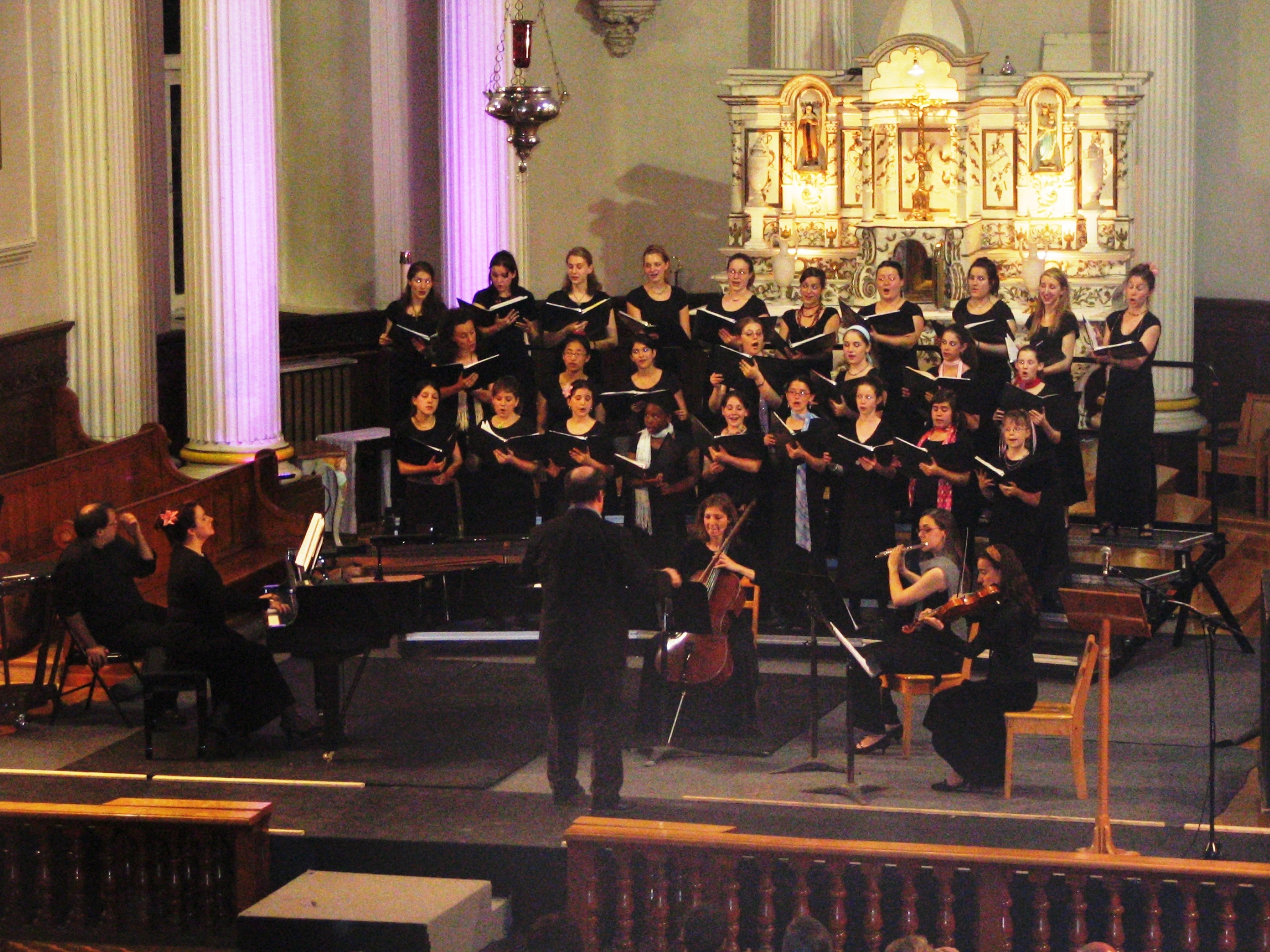
Classical concert

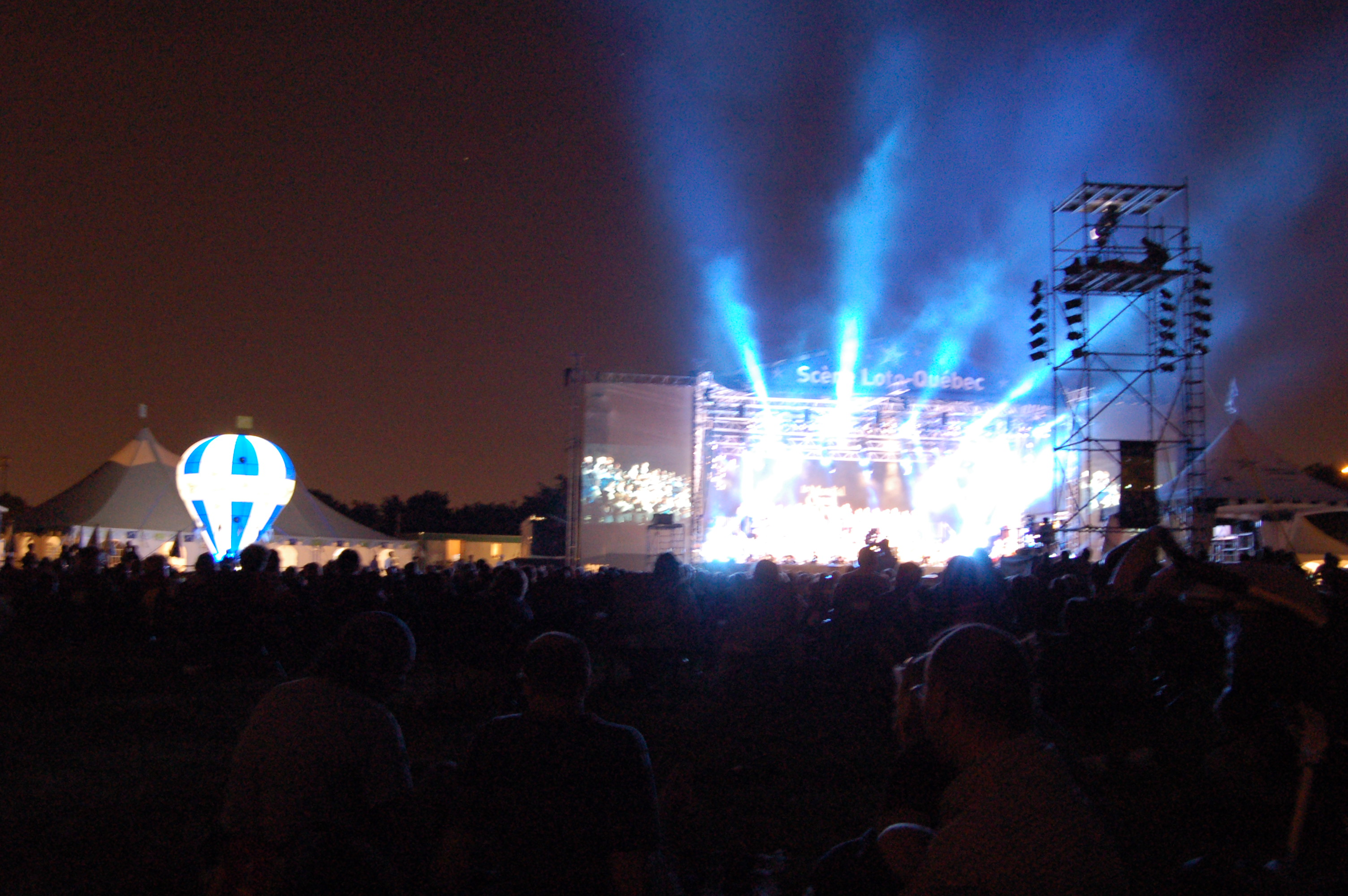
Outdoor event held at the Centre de la nature

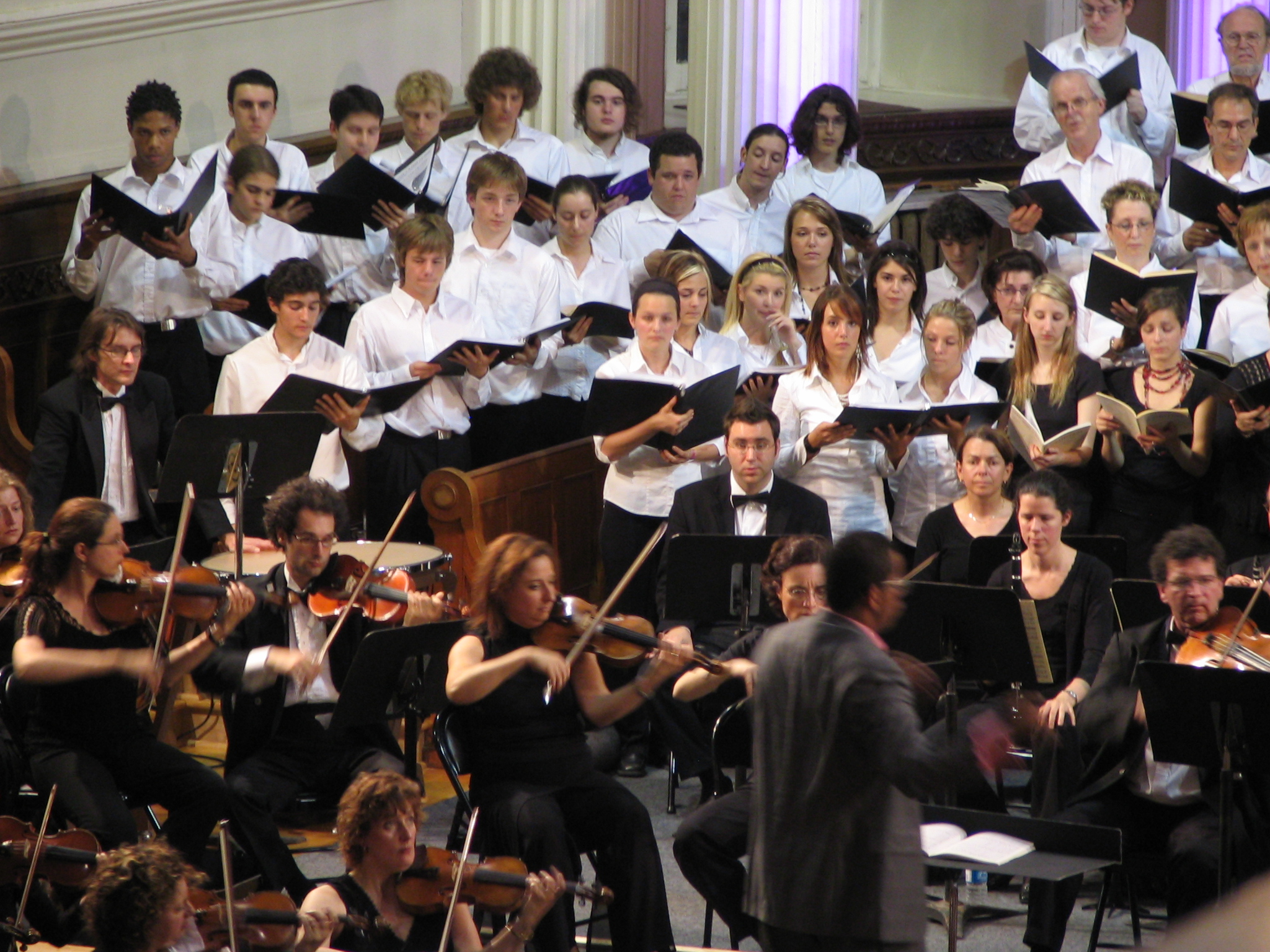
Orchestral concert

The Mondial Loto-Québec de Laval, also known as Mondial Choral, or Mondial Choral Loto-Québec (up to 2011) is a summer festival occurring in Laval, Quebec, Canada which takes place annually since 2005. The main sponsor of this occasion is Loto-Québec and Grégory Charles is the Art-Director and president.

== History ==
The festival first took place in Laval in June 2005. With more than 500.000 spectators, nearly 12.000 chorus-singers, hundreds of artists, more than 300 performances choral societies, the Mondial Choral is one of the largest gatherings of choruses in the world.

Each year, multiple events take place simultaneously. Indoor activities are mostly national and international Vocal ensemble and choirs competitions. Groups present their musical work in different Laval venues, churches and chapels.

Along with performers, celebrities such as Grégory Charles, Jireh and the Montreal Symphony Orchestra also perform in interior Concert Halls and marquees.

The free outdoor events usually take place for the Fête nationale du Québec on a large stage at the Centre de la nature. They include performers such as (in 2007) Malajube, Loco Locass, Mes Aïeux, Gilles Vigneault, Les Trois Accords; (in 2006) Robert Charlebois and Les Cowboys Fringants.

Mondial Choral won both first prizes of the "Grands prix du tourisme Québecois" in "Tourist festivals and events, Operating budget of 1 M$ or more" national category as well as "Price of the Company of the casinos of Quebec Tourist attraction – 100.000 visitors or more" regional category.

In 2010, progressive rock band Yes performed at the festival. New major rock shows were added to the program in 2012 as a result of a recent partnership with Evenko. Sarah McLachlan, LMFAO and Aerosmith are among the guests this upcoming year.

== Sites ==
Mondial Choral offers concerts and performances through the city of Laval.

Outdoor:

- Centre de la Nature
- Laval's downtown
- Centropolis

Concert halls:

- Salle André-Mathieu
- Maison des arts
- Marcellin-Champagnat theater

Churches:

- Chapelle de la Société des Pères des Missions-Étrangères
- Chapelle des Soeurs Missionnaires de l'Immaculée-Conception
- Chapelle du Mont-de-Lasalle
- Saint Elzéar church
- Saint-François-de-Sales church
- Saint Maxime church
- Sainte Dorothée church
- Sainte Rose church
