= Little Black Submarines =

Single by the Black Keys

from the album El Camino
- Released: October 8, 2012
- Recorded: March – May 2011 at Easy Eye Sound studio in Nashville, Tennessee
- Genre: Blues rock; folk rock; hard rock
- Length: 4:11 (album version); 3:24 (single edit)
- Label: Nonesuch
- Songwriters: Dan Auerbach; Danger Mouse; Patrick Carney
- Producers: Danger Mouse; The Black Keys

The Black Keys singles chronology
"Gold on the Ceiling" (2012)	"Little Black Submarines" (2012)	"Fever" (2014)

"Little Black Submarines" is a song by American rock band the Black Keys. It is the fourth track from their 2011 studio album, El Camino, and was released as the album's fourth single on October 8, 2012. The song begins as a quiet acoustic ballad before transitioning to a loud, hard rock arrangement in the second half. Critics praised the song and called it one of the highlights from El Camino. The song was a success on rock radio, reaching number two on the Alternative Songs chart in the US and the Alternative Rock and Active Rock charts in Canada. The group filmed a music video with director Danny Clinch at the Springwater Supper Club and Lounge, a dive bar in Nashville, Tennessee. "Little Black Submarines" was certified platinum in America.

== Writing and recording ==
"Little Black Submarines" originated as a song recorded by guitarist Dan Auerbach and producer Brian Burton that saw several alterations. The band recorded it "four or five different ways" before playing it in a sparse, acoustic arrangement. The group had a louder version of the song, but since they felt it "wasn't completely working", they spliced it after the acoustic version to create a mix with two contrasting sections. According to drummer Patrick Carney, the harder-rocking second half was the first time that the band played that arrangement. He said, "That whole ending is the first take we played, just figuring out what we're doing and riffing on that idea. That's why that part of the album feels the loosest. It's how Dan and I play. It's live in the studio, just guitar and drums, with the instruments bleeding into each other." Auerbach called the electric portion of "Little Black Submarines" the "closest representation of our live show than anything we've done before". The song concludes with a guitar solo that Auerbach described as his "jock-rock moment".

== Music video ==
The music video for "Little Black Submarines" was directed by Danny Clinch and filmed during the group's live performance at the Springwater Supper Club and Lounge, a small dive bar in Nashville, Tennessee. The venue, formerly a speakeasy, was the first place in the city to obtain a liquor license. Auerbach said, "It's a really cool building. It's been there forever. It's got a lot of history. It's one of three or four different little small dive bars in town. It's special because it's so old." The Black Keys allowed a small number of fans into the venue for filming of the one song before deciding to play an entire show. They originally had a storyline in mind for the video but ultimately abandoned the idea in favor of a conventional performance video. Auerbach said, "We all just sort of kind of mutually agreed that it should probably just be the performance and not any of the other extra stuff. Luckily we had live footage so we turned it into a live video. We just sort of said 'You know, it was fun kind of performing here at a small club with the fans. Why don't we just have it be that?'" The video premiered on September 4, 2012.

An autostereoscopic version of the video was featured on Nintendo Video for the 3DS on the premiere date.

== Reception ==
Upon El Camino's release, "Little Black Submarines" was acclaimed by critics, many of whom compared it to the sound of Led Zeppelin. Entertainment Weekly said that it was the album's "best surprise", calling it an "edge-of-sanity epic" and "a crate-digger thriller that starts as a quiet acoustic hymn, then explodes. They don't make vintage folk-rock heavy metal like they used to—if they ever used to. And that's a very good thing." NME called the song "more ambitious" than the album's other tracks and said that it "start[s] out in Johnny Cash territory before exploding into a psycho-blues freakdown." Spin said that in the song's second half, it "mushroom-clouds into electric warrior destruction". Kitty Empire of The Observer called the song's first half an "unremarkable acoustic ballad" but said of the second half, "Auerbach's guitar and Carney's drums erupt triumphantly in full lairy Zeppelin mode". Rolling Stone wrote that one could "easily hear Led Zeppelin in 'Little Black Submarines', an acoustic blues that gets run over halfway through by electric riffs and brutish drums, Carney doing a hilariously great junkyard John Bonham". The Independent called the song epic and said that it "transforms mid-song from moody acoustic reflection to full-blown Led Zep blues-rock barrage". Popmatters said the lyrics "speak a line so true it's as if it's been part of our collective unconscious for years, but it just took Dan Auerbach to bring it out. The line is simple but crushingly true, sung over a 'Stairway to Heaven'-esque progression: 'I should have seen it glow, but everybody knows that a broken heart is blind.' That line rings in your head for hours after the album even finishes, even as it's crushed into furious oblivion just as Jimmy Page would have asked." The Austin Chronicle was more critical, calling the song "a 'Stairway to Heaven' moment that falls a few stories short".

=== Accolades ===
In a 2011 end-of-year ranking, Rolling Stone selected "Little Black Submarines" as the 18th-best song of the year, calling it a "wintry folk ballad [that] erupts into a wind-whipped burner with a sugar crusted psych-rock chorus". The following year, the publication's readers voted the song the ninth-best of 2012.

== Personnel ==
- Dan Auerbach – vocals, guitar, bass
- Patrick Carney – drums, percussion
- Brian Burton – piano, organ
- Ashley Wilcoxson, Leisa Hans, Heather Rigdon – backing vocals

== Charts ==
=== Weekly charts ===
Weekly chart performance for "Little Black Submarines"
Chart (2012–2013)	Peak position
Belgium (Ultratop 50 Flanders)	62
Canada Hot 100 (Billboard)	54
Canada Rock (Billboard)	1
Netherlands (Single Top 100)	77
US Bubbling Under Hot 100 (Billboard)	6
US Hot Rock & Alternative Songs (Billboard)	6
US Rock & Alternative Airplay (Billboard)	3

=== Year-end charts ===
Year-end chart performance for "Little Black Submarines"
Chart (2013)	Position
US Hot Rock Songs (Billboard)	37
US Rock Airplay (Billboard)	10

== Certifications ==
Certifications and sales for "Little Black Submarines"
Region	Certification	Certified units/sales
Canada (Music Canada)	3× Platinum	240,000^{‡}
New Zealand (RMNZ)	Platinum	30,000^{‡}
United Kingdom (BPI)	Silver	200,000^{‡}
United States (RIAA)	Platinum	1,000,000^{‡}
^{*} Sales figures based on certification alone.^{‡} Sales+streaming figures based on certification alone.
