= Lonely Boy (The Black Keys song) =

2011 single by the Black Keys

- Digital single cover (Note: The 12-inch sleeve cover art is the same, but has the B-side track title printed below "Lonely Boy")

Single by the Black Keys

from the album El Camino
- B-side: "Run Right Back"
- Released: October 26, 2011
- Recorded: 2011
- Studio: Easy Eye Sound (Nashville, Tennessee)
- Genre: Garage rock; blues rock
- Length: 3:13
- Label: Nonesuch
- Songwriters: Dan Auerbach; Patrick Carney; Danger Mouse
- Producers: Danger Mouse; The Black Keys

The Black Keys singles chronology
"Howlin' for You" (2011)	"Lonely Boy" (2011)	"Gold on the Ceiling" (2012)

"Lonely Boy" is a song by American rock band the Black Keys. It is the opening track from their 2011 studio album El Camino and was released as the record's lead single on October 26, 2011. The song is also the A-side of a promotional 12-inch single that was released in commemoration of Record Store Day's "Back to Black" Friday event. The single was accompanied by a popular one-shot music video of a man dancing and lip-synching the lyrics.

"Lonely Boy" topped several rock radio charts, including the Rock Songs chart in the US and the Alternative Rock and Active Rock charts in Canada. On the singles charts, "Lonely Boy" was the group's highest-charting song in several countries, peaking at number 64 on the US Billboard Hot 100, number two on the Australian Singles Chart, and number 33 on the Canadian Hot 100. At the 55th Annual Grammy Awards, the song won awards for Best Rock Performance and Best Rock Song, while also receiving a nomination for Record of the Year.

== Composition ==
"Lonely Boy" is 3:13 in length. The song was written by Dan Auerbach and Patrick Carney with producer Danger Mouse. (Note: Danger Mouse is credited as a writer under his real name, Brian Burton.) The song is played in the key of E minor, with only three chords used throughout the song. "Lonely Boy" is set in the time signature of common time with a tempo of 168 beats per minute. According to Auerbach, the guitar riff was inspired by Johnny Burnette's cover of "Train Kept A-Rollin'". The guitar line features a dive bomb, although Auerbach uses a Boss Super Shifter pitch shift pedal to achieve the effect.

== Release ==
=== Music video ===
The promotional music video for "Lonely Boy" features actor, musician and part-time security guard Derrick T. Tuggle dancing and lip-syncing to the song in front of the Pepper Tree Motel in North Hollywood, a neighborhood of Los Angeles, California. The video, shot in a single take, went viral and garnered more than 400,000 views on YouTube within 24 hours. The video originally had a script and a cast of more than 40 people, but the group was not pleased with the results. Auerbach said, "A couple of weeks after we shot it they sent us the edit and it was awful. We sent it back... they sent us another edit and it was terrible. That's when we said 'what about that one guy, the extra who had that one dance scene' and that's the video – the most expensive single shot ever recorded." Tuggle was originally cast as an extra who would be handed a set of keys to the band's motel room by Auerbach and Carney. While on set, Tuggle's improvised dancing drew the attention of director Jesse Dylan. He said, "The director just sort of noticed me dancing and asked me, 'Can you perform?' I said, 'I can dance, anybody can dance,' so I took some moves from everybody: John Travolta from Saturday Night Fever and Pulp Fiction, the Carlton Banks dance from The Fresh Prince and a little bit of Michael Jackson, so it was a smörgåsbord of everybody in there." He added, "It was just a spur-of-the-moment thing. My acting teacher Mark McPherson, he has us do this thing before we start class called 'Song and Dance,' where he'll have us sing one of our favorite songs, and then while we're singing it, he'll have us do a crazy dance, or a sexy dance, and I guess it spawned from that." The video was nominated for a 2012 MTV Video Music Award for Best Rock Video. Tuggle's performance later earned him a cameo appearance in the music video for "Happy" by Pharrell Williams as well as a return performance in the Black Keys' 2024 single "On the Game".

=== Cover art ===
The cover of the single release features an image of a bulldozer sitting on an empty tract of land. The lot was previously filled by the factory at which the group's 2004 album Rubber Factory was recorded. Michael Carney, the group's art director, went to take a photo of the factory but found that it had been demolished. Auerbach joked about the cover's significance: "We keep stumbling into these profound artistic expressions. That's how we roll though."

=== Commercial performance ===
"Lonely Boy" topped the Rock Songs chart in the US and the Alternative Rock and Active Rock charts in Canada. On the singles charts, it became the band's highest-charting song in several countries, reaching a peak of number 64 on the US Billboard Hot 100 (which beats the number 87 peak achieved by 2010's "Tighten Up"), number two on the Australian Singles Chart, and number 33 on the Canadian Hot 100. The song was certified nine-times platinum in Canada, triple-platinum in Australia, platinum in New Zealand, and gold in Denmark.

== Reception ==
=== Critical reaction ===
In a review of the single, Rolling Stone gave the song four out of five stars, saying that "Frustrated desire is the song's ostensible theme... but for Keys fans, this is a clean hit of instant gratification." Its review of El Camino praised the song's arrangement, particularly the "sugar-crusted keyboard" that, along with the chorus, "chang[es] the swampy chug into a seductive singalong". James Lachno of The Daily Telegraph said the song "blends Steppenwolf's road-tripping aesthetic with the proto-punk of the Modern Lovers" and was an example of how a "broader collage of influences allows the duo to fashion a more distinctive sound". Pitchfork Media reviewer Rob Harvilla called it a "surging opener" and highlighted the "machine-gun surge of Dan Auerbach's gong-banging guitar". Kitty Empire of The Observer wrote, "It's hard to resist the taut and catchy single".

=== Accolades ===
Readers of Rolling Stone voted "Lonely Boy" the third-best song of 2011 in an end-of-year poll. Paste ranked it number 20 on its list of "The 50 Best Songs of 2011". The song placed second on the Triple J Hottest 100, 2011 poll of the most popular songs in Australia. According to AirCheck, "Lonely Boy" was the most-played song on Australian radio in 2012, logging more than 884 hours of playtime.

At the 55th Annual Grammy Awards, "Lonely Boy" was nominated for Best Rock Performance, Best Rock Song and Record of the Year, winning the first two.

== Track listing ==
All tracks are written by Dan Auerbach, Patrick Carney and Brian Burton.

No.	Title	Length
1.	"Lonely Boy"	3:13
2.	"Run Right Back"	3:17

== Personnel ==
- Dan Auerbach – guitars, vocals
- Patrick Carney – drums
- Danger Mouse – production, bass guitar, keyboards

Additional personnel:

- Leisa Hans – backing vocals
- Heather Rigdon – backing vocals
- Ashley Wilcoxson – backing vocals

== Charts ==
=== Weekly charts ===
Chart (2011–2013)	Peak position
Australia (ARIA)	2
Belgium (Ultratop 50 Flanders)	13
Belgium (Ultratip Bubbling Under Wallonia)	4
Canada Hot 100 (Billboard)	33
Canada Rock (Billboard)	1
France (SNEP)	33
Ireland (IRMA)	40
Japan Hot 100 (Billboard)	49
Japan Hot Overseas (Billboard)	14
Netherlands (Single Top 100)	80
New Zealand (Recorded Music NZ)	7
Switzerland Airplay (Schweizer Hitparade)	100
UK Singles (OCC)	80
US Billboard Hot 100	64
US Rock Songs (Billboard)	1

=== Year-end charts ===
Chart (2012)	Position
Australia (ARIA)	41
Belgium (Ultratop 50 Flanders)	83
France (SNEP)	176
New Zealand (RIANZ)	42
US Rock Songs (Billboard)	1

=== Decade-end charts ===
Chart (2010–2019)	Position
US Hot Rock Songs (Billboard)	35

== Certifications ==
Region	Certification	Certified units/sales
Australia (ARIA)	3× Platinum	210,000^{^}
Canada (Music Canada)	5× Platinum	400,000^{‡}
Denmark (IFPI Danmark)	Gold	45,000^{‡}
Italy (FIMI)	Platinum	50,000^{‡}
New Zealand (RMNZ)	4× Platinum	120,000^{‡}
Spain (Promusicae)	Platinum	60,000^{‡}
United Kingdom (BPI)	Platinum	600,000^{‡}
United States (RIAA)	2× Platinum	2,000,000^{‡}
^{^} Shipments figures based on certification alone.^{‡} Sales+streaming figures based on certification alone.

== Use in popular media ==
The song has been used for the UFC Primetime event, UFC on Fox: Velasquez vs. Dos Santos, and in the soundtracks for Need for Speed: The Run and Forza Horizon. It was also used in a highlights package prior to the Italy vs. England match in the 2012 Six Nations and for Drew Brees and Alex Smith in the pregame before a 2011 NFL Divisional Playoff game between Brees' New Orleans Saints and Smith's San Francisco 49ers. It also featured on Channel 4 Racing during their preview of a big race where Jim McGrath talked through the runners.

During the midpoint of the 2011–12 NHL season, it has been the goal song for the Buffalo Sabres and Edmonton Oilers. For most of the 2011–12 NHL season, it has been the song played when the New York Rangers come onto the ice before home games.

On TV, the song was featured in episodes of Workaholics, Eastbound & Down and Hawaii Five-0, the first episode of 24/7 Flyers/Rangers: Road to the NHL Winter Classic, the twelfth episode of season three, "The Ties That Bind", on The Vampire Diaries, the episode "Broken" of Criminal Minds, and in the opening sequence for episode one in the Australian TV show Underbelly: Badness. It was also used in 2012 commercials for the launch of the A&E in Australia and Lee.

In movies, it was most recently heard in the trailers for the 2013 zombie comedy Warm Bodies, the 2014 family comedy Alexander and the Terrible, Horrible, No Good, Very Bad Day, the 2016 monster action comedy film Monster Trucks, and a trailer for the 2022 science fiction animated film Lightyear.
