= Attack & Release =

Studio album by The Black Keys
- Released: April 1, 2008
- Recorded: August 9–23, 2007
- Studio: Suma (Painesville, Ohio)
- Genre: Blues rock; garage rock; psychedelic rock
- Length: 37:21
- Label: Nonesuch; V2
- Producer: Danger Mouse

The Black Keys chronology
| Magic Potion (2006) | Attack & Release (2008) | Blakroc (2009) |

Singles from Attack & Release
- 1. "Strange Times" Released: March 24, 2008; 2. "I Got Mine" Released: June 2, 2008; 3. "Oceans and Streams" Released: September 22, 2008; 4. "Same Old Thing" Released: November 24, 2008

Professional ratings
Aggregate scores
| Source | Rating |
|---|---|
| Metacritic | 76/100 |
Review scores
| Source | Rating |
| AllMusic | 3.5/5 stars |
| The A.V. Club | B− |
| Entertainment Weekly | A− |
| The Guardian | 3/5 stars |
| Mojo | 4/5 stars |
| Pitchfork | 7.5/10 |
| Rolling Stone | 3.5/5 stars |
| Spin | 3.5/5 stars |
| The Times | 4/5 stars |
| Uncut | 4/5 stars |

Attack & Release is the fifth studio album by American rock duo The Black Keys. It was produced by Danger Mouse and was released on April 1, 2008. The sessions saw the band transitioning away from their "homemade" ethos to record-making; not only was it the first time that the band completed an album in a professional studio, but it was also the first time they hired an outside producer to work on a record.

Leading up to the recording sessions, drummer Patrick Carney wanted to change the sound of his drums and envisioned two approaches to doing so. He said, "I had one of the Bonham reissue kits and I set that up in a live room. And then I knew I wanted a kind of '70s dead sound too, so I did the whole 'towels on the drums' thing." Attack & Release features a guest appearance by Marc Ribot, who used to play alongside Carney's uncle in Tom Waits' band.

Attack & Release debuted at number 14 on the Billboard 200. The album was ranked 83rd on Rolling Stone's list of the greatest albums of the 2000s. The song "I Got Mine" was number 23 on Rolling Stone's list of the 100 Best Songs of 2008. (Note: "The 100 Best Songs of 2008". Rolling Stone (December 25, 2008). Retrieved December 25, 2008) In 2012, the album was certified gold in Canada, and gold in the U.S. in 2016.

== Track listing ==
All tracks are written by Dan Auerbach and Patrick Carney, except "Things Ain't Like They Used to Be" by Dan Auerbach.

| No. | Title | Length |
|---|---|---|
| 1. | "All You Ever Wanted" | 2:55 |
| 2. | "I Got Mine" | 3:58 |
| 3. | "Strange Times" | 3:09 |
| 4. | "Psychotic Girl" | 4:10 |
| 5. | "Lies" | 3:58 |
| 6. | "Remember When (Side A)" | 3:21 |
| 7. | "Remember When (Side B)" | 2:10 |
| 8. | "Same Old Thing" | 3:08 |
| 9. | "So He Won't Break" | 4:13 |
| 10. | "Oceans and Streams" | 3:25 |
| 11. | "Things Ain't Like They Used to Be" | 4:34 |

Notes

- "Things Ain't Like They Used to Be" features a duet between Dan Auerbach and then 17-year-old bluegrass/country singer Jessica Lea Mayfield.

== Personnel ==
The Black Keys

- Dan Auerbach – vocals, guitars, bass guitar
- Patrick Carney – drums, percussion

Additional musicians

- Danger Mouse (Brian Burton) – Hohner bass 3, Korg and Moog synthesizers, piano, organ
- Carla Monday – harmony vocals on "I Got Mine", "Psychotic Girl" and "Lies"
- Jessica Lea Mayfield – harmony vocals on "Things Ain't Like They Used to Be"
- Ralph Carney – jaw harp on "I Got Mine", contra bass clarinet on "Lies", clarinet on "Remember When", flute and concert bass harmonica on "Same Old Thing"
- Marc Ribot – guitar solo on "Lies" and "So He Won't Break", rhythm guitar on "Remember When (Side A)", and slide guitar on "Oceans and Streams"

== Charts ==
Chart performance for Attack & Release
| Chart (2008) | Peak position |
|---|---|
| Australian Albums (ARIA) | 12 |
| Belgian Albums (Ultratop Flanders) | 42 |
| Dutch Albums (Album Top 100) | 62 |
| French Albums (SNEP) | 105 |
| Scottish Albums (OCC) | 38 |
| UK Albums (OCC) | 34 |
| US Billboard 200 | 14 |

== Certifications ==
| Region | Certification | Certified units/sales |
|---|---|---|
| Canada (Music Canada) | Gold | 40,000^{^} |
| United Kingdom (BPI) | Gold | 100,000^{^} |
| United States (RIAA) | Gold | 500,000^{‡} |
^{^} Shipments figures based on certification alone.^{‡} Sales+streaming figures based on certification alone.
