= Lilly Hiatt =

Tennessee Singer-songwriter

- Hiatt at Ohana Music Festival in 2018

Background information
- Born: Lillian Alice Hiatt; April 26, 1984 (age 42); Los Angeles, California
- Origin: Nashville, Tennessee
- Genres: Rock music Country music Folk music
- Occupation: Musician
- Instrument: Guitar
- Years active: 2005–present
- Labels: Normaltown; New West Records
- Website: LillyHiatt.com

Lillian "Lilly" Alice Hiatt (born April 26, 1984) is an American, Nashville, Tennessee-based singer-songwriter. She is the daughter of singer-songwriter John Hiatt.

== Early life and education ==
Hiatt was born in Los Angeles, California. Her father is singer-songwriter John Hiatt and her mother was film sound editor Isabella Wood. Wood was Hiatt's second wife. Wood, who was at that time separated from John Hiatt, died by suicide when her daughter was almost one year old.

Hiatt grew up in Nashville, Tennessee, on a farm with her father, his third wife Nancy Stanley Hiatt, older brother Rob, and younger sister Georgia Rae.

Hiatt has played music since she was 12, when her father gave her her first guitar, a 1953 parlor-size Martin.

In 2006, Hiatt graduated from the University of Denver with a degree in psychology.

== Career ==
In 2005, Hiatt formed a band, Shake Go Home, in Denver with fellow students from University of Denver. After graduation, the band moved to Nashville and recorded several EPs. Band members included Hiatt, Eric Knutson on guitar, Jeff Montoya on bass, and John Arrotti on drums. Hiatt relocated briefly to Austin, Texas, but returned to Nashville in 2013.

In 2012, Hiatt released her debut album, Let Down. The record was produced by Doug Lancio (Patty Griffin, Matthew Ryan, Todd Snider).

In 2015, Hiatt released her second album, Royal Blue, on the Normaltown label, an imprint of New West. The record was produced by Nashville producer Adam Landry (Deer Tick, Rayland Baxter, Middle Brother), and was recorded using analog recording technology. Hiatt employed synthesizer as well as pedal steel, and broadened the scope of her style to reflect her musical influences.

Hiatt's band that she recorded her first two records with was called Lilly Hiatt and the Dropped Ponies, and included guitarist Beth Finney, drummer Jon Radford, bass player Jake Bradley, and Luke Schneider on pedal steel.

In 2016, at a mansion in East Nashville, the Luck Reunion organization gathered pairs of musicians to collaborate on songs for a series of 45 rpm singles recorded using analog equipment provided by Third Man Records. Hiatt together with Aaron Lee Tasjan recorded two songs: Guy Clark's "Dublin Blues" and John Prine's "Angel from Montgomery"

In August 2017, Hiatt released her third album, Trinity Lane. The record was produced by Michael Trent of Shovels & Rope and was recorded on Johns Island in South Carolina. Cary Ann Hearst of Shovels & Rope appears on vocals on the track "Everything I Had." The record's title comes from a main street in East Nashville in Tennessee. Hiatt said that although the songs often have a dark subject matter, the record is a rock and roller.

Hiatt used a new band on her album, Trinity Lane. The band members are John Condit on guitar, Robert Hudson on bass, and Allen Jones on drums.

In 2022, Hiatt appeared on the second compilation from East Nashville indie label 3Sirens, founded by friends and artists The Grahams. "3Sirens Presents: Part 2" was a collection of 80s and 90s cover songs, featuring performances from Hiatt, Nicole Atkins, Elizabeth Cook and The Grahams. Lilly Hiatt's cover of "Under The Milky Way" by was originally recorded by The Church.

Hiatt has toured with Aaron Lee Tasjan, John Moreland, Drive-by Truckers, Margo Price, and John Prine, as well as many others.

== Personal life ==
Hiatt lives in East Nashville, Tennessee. She struggled with addiction and became sober in her late 20s.

== Discography ==
=== Solo albums ===
- 2012: Let Down (Normaltown Records)
- 2015: Royal Blue (Normaltown Records)
- 2017: Trinity Lane (New West Records)
- 2020: Walking Proof (New West Records)
- 2021: Lately (New West Records)
- 2025: Forever (New West Records)

=== Singles ===
- 2017: Luck Mansion Sessions (Third Man Records) with Aaron Lee Tasjan – songs: "Dublin Blues" and "Angel from Montgomery"
- 2022: 3Sirens Presents: With Love Part 2 (3Sirens) with Elizabeth Cook - song: "Under The Milky Way".

=== Also appears on ===
- 2008: John Hiatt – Same Old Man (New West)
- 2011: Across Tundras – Sage (Neurot)
- 2012: Ronnie Fauss – I Am the Man You Know I'm Not (Normaltown)

== Awards and nominations ==
Year	Association	Category	Nominated work	Result
2018	Americana Music Honors & Awards	Emerging Artist of the Year	Lilly Hiatt	Nominated
