= Danny Garibay =

American music producer

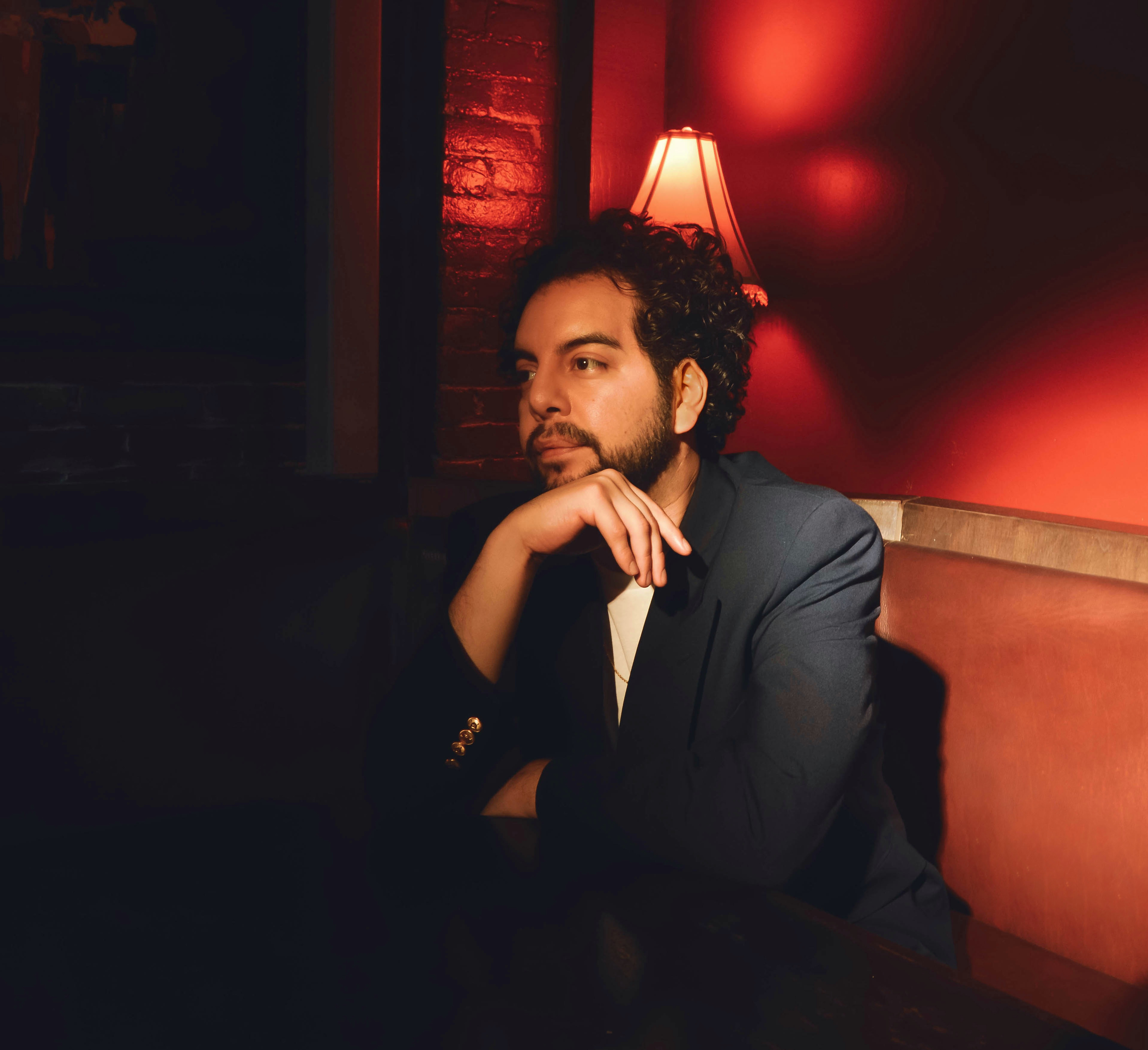

Background information
- Born: Los Angeles, California, United States
- Genres: Pop; alternative; indie; R&B
- Occupations: Producer; songwriter; mix engineer
- Years active: 2000s–present
- Website: www.loomenes.com

Danny Garibay is a Grammy-nominated American record producer, songwriter, and mix engineer based in Los Angeles, California.

== Career ==
Garibay was born and raised in Los Angeles, California.

Early in his career as a music producer, Garibay joined Troy Carter's company, Atom Factory Entertainment. While at Atom Factory, Garibay helped bring The Ceremonies to Carter, who eventually signed them on to his company in 2012. This initial collaboration then subsequently led to a partnership to sign The Ceremonies to Capitol Records.

Garibay has also worked with Alicia Lemke, also known as Alice and the Glass Lake, on her album Chimaera. Lemke died from leukemia in August 2015, after which Garibay took five months to perfect the posthumous album and work on tracks such as "Coals".

Over the course of his career, Garibay has also collaborated with musical artists Simon Curtis, Cory Henry, Kossisko, Sky Keller, Semi Precious Weapons, G-Eazy, Kiesza, and many other well-known artists.

Garibay works in his Hollywood recording/mixing studio, operating under the production company name lo͞omənəs.

== Awards and nominations ==
=== Grammy Awards ===
Year	Nominee / work	Award	Result
2023	Operation Funk	Best Progressive R&B Album	TBA
2022	Something to Say	Best Progressive R&B Album	Nominated

== Discography ==
Danny Garibay's discography is as follows.

Year	Artist	Song(s)	Album	Production Credit
2022	Dorothy	"What's Coming To Me - Unplugged"	What's Coming To Me (Unplugged)	Producer, writer
2022	Cory Henry	"Hurts My Brain"	Operation Funk	Mixer
2022	Simon Curtis	"Ketamine" "I'm Not Sorry" "Fairyboy"	n/a	Producer, writer, mixer
2021	Dorothy	"What's Coming To Me"	What's Coming To Me	Producer, writer
2020	Cory Henry	"Don't Forget" "Happy Days" "Gawt Damn" "Switch" "Anything For You" "Rise" "Icarus" "No Guns" "Black Man" "Say Their Names" "Dedicated"	Something To Say	Mixer
2020	Sky Keller	"High and Hurt"	n/a	Producer, writer, mixer
2019	Simon Curtis	"Graduate" "Rainbow"	Graduate	Producer, writer, mixer
2019	Kossisko	"Heaven" feat. G-Eazy	Low	Producer, writer
2019	Sky Keller	"Platonic"	n/a	Producer, writer, mixer
2019	Simon Curtis	"Love"	n/a	Producer, writer, mixer
2018	Jaylien	"That's The Way Love Goes"	Summer's Over 2	Producer, writer
2018	Kossisko	"Lady Diamond" "Heaven"	Low	Producer, writer
2018	Cathedrals	"Behave"	n/a	Co-Producer
2018	Sky Keller	"Don't Get It" "Weekend" "Bad"	n/a	Producer, writer, mixer
2018	Cory Henry & the Funk Apostles	"Trade It All" "In The Water" "Our Affairs" "Just A Word" "Takes All Time" feat. Robert Randolph "Send Me A Sign" feat. Robert Randolph	Art Of Love	Mixer
2016	Alice and the Glass Lake	"I Imagine" "Echo" "Can't Do A Thing" "Air" "Apart At The Seams" "Coals" "Supernova" feat. Kiesza "Beast" "Distance" "Asking"	Chimaera	Producer (also exec.), Writer, Co-Writer
2015	The Ceremonies	"In The Name Of Fright"	n/a	Producer, Co-Writer
2014	Semi Precious Weapons	"Cherries On Ice" "Free Booze"	Aviation	Producer, writer
2013	The Ceremonies	"Wolfdance" "Land Of Gathering" "Straw Hat" "Ballroom Bones" "Nightlight"	The Ceremonies (EP)	Producer (also exec.), Writer, Co-Writer

== See also ==
- Troy Carter (music industry)
