= Ceremony (disambiguation) =

A ceremony is a unified ritualistic event with a purpose.

Ceremony, Ceremonial, or other variants may also refer to:

== Film and television ==
- The Ceremony (1963 film), an American crime film directed by Laurence Harvey
- The Ceremony (1971 film), a Japanese film directed by Nagisa Ōshima
- Ceremony (2010 film), a 2010 American film directed by Max Winkler
- Ceremony (2026 film), a Canadian documentary film directed by Banchi Hanuse
- The Ceremony (2024 film), a British drama film
- The Ceremony (Big Love), an episode of the American drama television series Big Love

== Literature ==
- Ceremony (Parker novel), a 1982 Spenser novel by Robert B. Parker
- Ceremony (Silko novel), a 1977 novel by Leslie Marmon Silko
- Ceremonies: Prose and Poetry, a 1992 book by Essex Hemphill
- The Ceremonies (novel), a 1984 novel by T. E. D. Klein

== Music ==
=== Performers ===
- Ceremony (punk band), an American punk band
- The Ceremonies (band), an American rock band
- Ceremony, Chaz Bono's band from the 1990s

=== Albums ===
- Ceremony (The Cult album) or the title song, 1991
- Ceremony (Anna von Hausswolff album), 2013
- Ceremony (King Gnu album), 2020
- Ceremony (Phantogram album) or the title song, 2020
- Ceremony (Spooky Tooth and Pierre Henry album), 1969
- Ceremony (Tiny Ruins album), 2023
- Ceremony – A New Order Tribute, a various artists compilation, 2010
- Ceremony: Remixes & Rarities, by Santana, 2003
- Ceremonial (Pink Cream 69 album), 2013
- Ceremonial (Savage Republic album) or the title song, 1985
- Ceremonials, by Florence and the Machine, 2011
- The Ceremony (album), a 2024 album by Kevin Gates

=== EPs ===
- Ceremony (EP), by Pentagon, 2017
- The Ceremonies (EP), by the Ceremonies, 2013

=== Songs ===
- "Ceremony" (Deftones song), 2021
- "Ceremony" (Joe Satriani song), 1998
- "Ceremony" (New Order song), 1981
- "Ceremony" (Stray Kids song), 2025
- "The Ceremony" (song), by George Jones and Tammy Wynette, 1972
- "Ceremony", by Super Junior-L.S.S. from Let's Standing Show, 2024
- "The Ceremony", by Oh Land from Askepot, 2016

== Technology ==
- The Ceremony (cryptography), a trusted setup procedure executed to create the Zcash private key

== Spirituality ==
- Caeremoniale Episcoporum, a Catholic liturgical book
- Customary (liturgy), a type of Christian liturgical book sometimes known as a ceremonial
- Ceremonial magic, practices and rituals related to supernatural magic
