= Forever (Lilly Hiatt album) =

Studio album by Lilly Hiatt
- Released: January 31, 2025
- Studio: The Mole Hill, Nashville, Tennessee
- Genre: Alternative rock
- Length: 29:24
- Label: New West
- Producer: Coley Hinson

Lilly Hiatt chronology
Lately (2021)	Forever (2025)

Forever is the sixth studio album by American singer-songwriter Lilly Hiatt. It was released on January 31, 2025, by New West Records.

== Background ==
The album, produced by Hiatt's husband, Coley Hinson, introduced a stylistic shift in Hiatt's music from Americana in her 2020 project, Walking Proof, towards alternative rock, and centers on the themes of personal identity and solitude.

== Reception ==
Professional ratings
Review scores
Source	Rating
AllMusic	4/5 stars
Pitchfork	7.5/10
PopMatters	8/10 stars
Slant	4/5 stars

AllMusic stated about the album, "Was anyone asking Lilly Hiatt to make a 1990s alternative album? No, and that's part of why Forever works so well – here, she's just doing what feels right in the moment, and it sounds every bit as right to the listener." Pitchfork rated it 7.5 out of ten, and described it as "an album that wears its intimacy as a point of pride yet doesn't sound like we expect intimacy to sound."

No Depression remarked "Forever is proof that great art doesn't exclusively come out of periods of misery and heartbreak, but neither out of that quiet moment when all the cheering from the sidelines fades away and all that's left are the familiar routines and surroundings." Slant Magazine assigned Forever a rating of four stars, stating it "adds to her repertoire is its unrelenting barrage of brawling guitars, punkish attitude, and hopped-up melodicism," and calling it "by far Hiatt's most exhilarating album."

Guitar Player wrote "Hiatt and Coley coated the songs in a confection of melody and buzzy guitar riffs, with Hiatt's vocals hovering above the fray, encased in watery reverb." PopMatters rated the album eight out of ten and noted "Forever celebrates the experiences couples have, the memories they create, and the struggles they overcome together."

== Track listing ==
All tracks are written by Lilly Hiatt.

Forever track listing
No.	Title	Writer(s)	Length
1.	"Hidden Day"	Scot Sax	2:43
2.	"Shouldn't Be"		3:12
3.	"Ghost Ship"		3:58
4.	"Somewhere"		3:21
5.	"Evelyn's House"		2:55
6.	"Forever"		3:08
7.	"Man"		3:14
8.	"Kwik-E-Mart"		3:35
9.	"Thoughts"		3:18
Total length:			29:24

== Personnel ==
Credits for Forever adapted from Bandcamp.

- Lilly Hiatt – vocals, guitar
- Coley Hinson – producer, engineer, guitar, drums, bass, mandolin, keyboard, vocals
- Steven Hinson – pedal steel (tracks 5, 7)
- John Hiatt – vocals (track 9)
- Bear Mitchell – bass (track 1)
- Scot Sax – guitar, drums (track 1)
- Rachel Mitchell – vocals (track 1)
- Coley Hinson – engineer
- Paul Q. Kolderie – mixing
- Jonathan DeBaun – mixing (track 1)
- John Golden – mastering
- Chip Douglas – art direction
- Fetzer Design – design
- Kristy Benjamin – photography
