= Glory Bound =

Glory Bound may refer to:

- Glory Bound, album by The Wailin' Jennys
- Glory Bound, album by The Grahams
- "Glory Bound", single by The Grass Roots from Move Along 1972
- "Glory Bound", song by Martin Sexton
