= Caitlin Rose =

American country singer

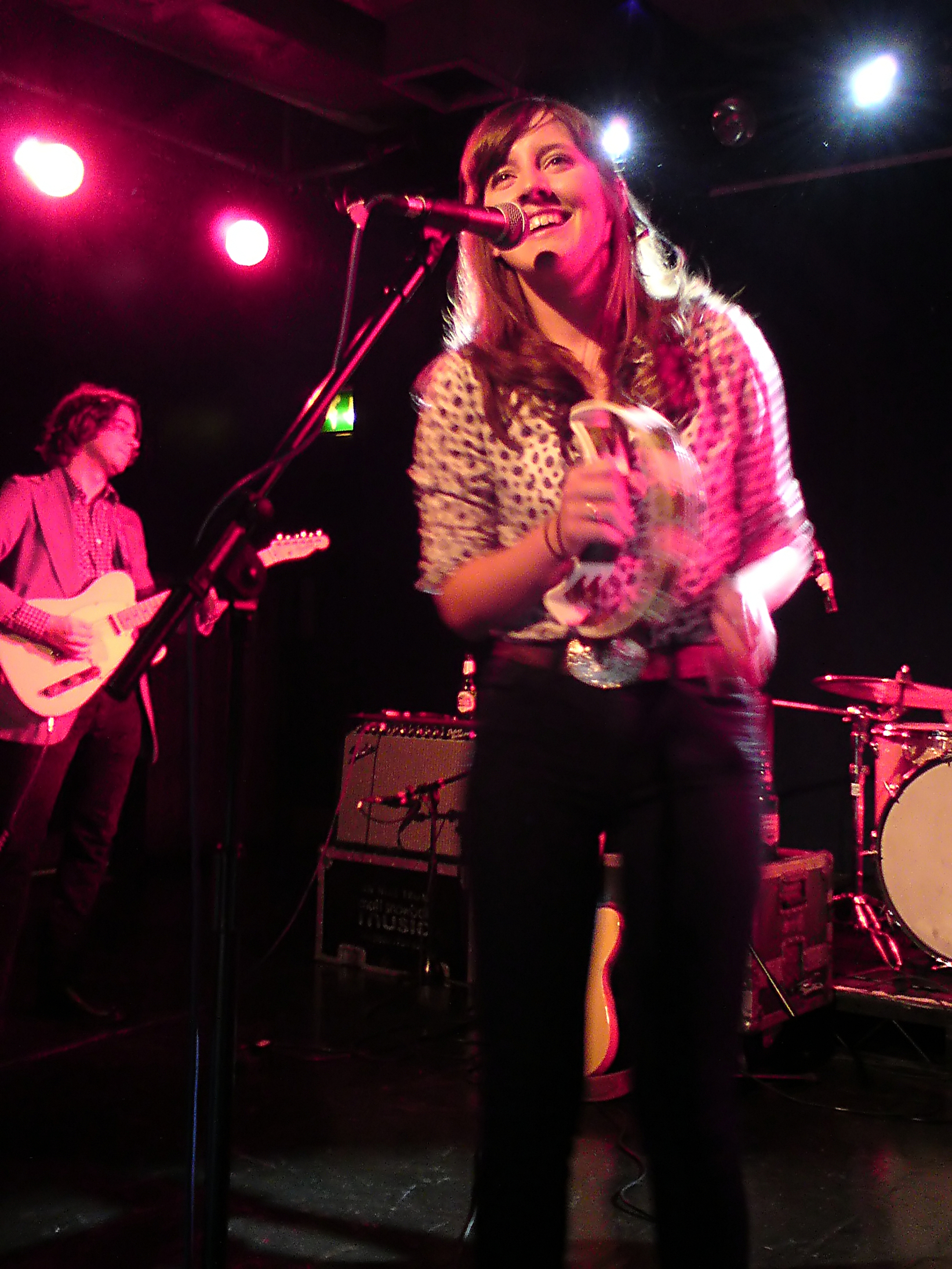
- Rose performing in 2011

Background information
- Born: Caitlin Elisabeth Rose; June 23, 1987 (age 39); Dallas, Texas, U.S.
- Origin: Nashville, Tennessee, U.S.
- Genres: Indie folk, alternative country
- Occupations: Musician, singer-songwriter
- Instruments: Vocals, guitar
- Years active: 2006–present
- Labels: Names, ATO, MapleMusic Recordings
- Formerly of: Save Macaulay
- Website: thecaitlinrose.com

Caitlin Elisabeth Rose (born June 23, 1987) is an American country singer and songwriter from Nashville, Tennessee. She has released three albums, Own Side Now (2010), The Stand-In (2013) and Cazimi (2022). She also recorded two Arctic Monkeys songs for Record Store Day in 2012.

== Career ==
Rose was previously the lead singer of Nashville indie band Save Macaulay, on local label Theory 8 until 2007. As a solo artist, she signed to BMI in 2008. The title track of her seven-track 2008 EP, Dead Flowers, is a cover of a Rolling Stones song.

Her first album, Own Side Now, was released by Names Records in August 2010. Her vocal performance and lyrics have led to comparisons to Loretta Lynn, Patsy Cline, and Iris DeMent. Claire Suddath of Time magazine named Own Side Now one of the Top 10 Albums of 2011, ranking it at No. 7.

Her next studio album, The Stand-In, was released on February 25, 2013.

After a nine-year gap, she released the album Cazimi on November 18, 2022.

Also in 2022, Caitlin Rose appeared on local East Nashville indie label 3Sirens' debut compilation. The label is founded by The Grahams. "3Sirens Presents: With Love Part 1" is a collection of 80s and 90s cover songs, including Rose's take on Blondie's classic "One Way Or Another". Also featured on the release were local East Nashville favorites Derek Hoke, The Grahams, Dylan LeBlanc and Andrew Combs.

== Personal life ==
Rose's mother is country songwriter Liz Rose (who shares a Grammy nomination for writing with Taylor Swift). She was born in Dallas, Texas, and her family moved to Nashville in 1994. She attended community college in Nashville for a year before leaving to focus on music. Rose is a big fan of astrology, and her 2022 album, Cazimi, is an astrological term for when the sun and another planet are perfectly conjoined.

== Discography ==
=== Albums ===
Title	Album details	Peak chart positions	
Title	Album details	US Country	US Heat
Dead Flowers	Release date: 2008; Label: Names Records	—	—
Own Side Now	Release date: August 17, 2010; Label: Names Records	—	—
The Stand-In	Release date: March 5, 2013; Label: ATO Records	42	29
Cazimi	Release date: November 18, 2022; Label: Names Records/Missing Piece	—	—

=== Track listings ===
- Dead Flowers; EP, 2008
1. Shotgun Wedding
2. Answer in One of These Bottles
3. Three Cigarettes in an Ashtray
4. Docket
5. Gorilla Man
6. Dead Flowers
7. T-shirt
- Own Side Now; album, 2010
1. Learning to Ride
2. Own Side
3. For the Rabbits
4. Shanghai Cigarettes
5. New York
6. Spare Me (Fetzer's Blues)
7. Things Change
8. That's Alright
9. Sinful Wishing Well
10. Coming Up
- Piledriver Waltz; 7-inch, 2012 (covers of two Arctic Monkeys songs, limited edition vinyl release for Record Store Day 2012)
1. Piledriver Waltz
2. Love Is a Laserquest
- The Stand-In; album, February 25, 2013
1. "No One to Call"
2. "I Was Cruel"
3. "Waitin'"
4. "Only a Clown"
5. "Dallas"
6. "Pink Champagne"
7. "Golden Boy"
8. "Silver Sings"
9. "Everywhere I Go"
10. "When I'm Gone"
11. "Menagerie"
12. "Old Numbers"

=== Music videos ===
Year	Video	Director
2013	"Only a Clown"	Michael Carter
