= We Love You (Semi Precious Weapons album) =

Studio album by Semi Precious Weapons
- Released: September 30, 2008
- Recorded: 2007–2008
- Genre: Alternative rock
- Label: Razor & Tie
- Producer: Mario J. McNulty; Semi Precious Weapons

Semi Precious Weapons chronology
We Love You (2008)	You Love You (2010)

Singles from We Love You
- 1. "Semi Precious Weapons"; 2. "Magnetic Baby" Released: October 2007

Professional ratings
Review scores
Source	Rating
AllMusic	3.5/5 stars

We Love You is the debut studio album by New York rock band Semi Precious Weapons. The album was originally released as a free download. However, when the group signed with Razor & Tie Records in 2008, they re-released the album under their new label. Several of the songs became live favourites, including the eponymous track and "Magnetic Baby". These songs, along with several other tracks from the record, were re-recorded with the band's new line-up for their follow up album entitled You Love You. The track "Semi Precious Weapons" was named "Brink of Fame Song" at the 2008 NewNowNext Awards.

== Track listing ==
All tracks are written by Justin Tranter and Aaron Lee Tasjan, except where noted.

No.	Title	Writer(s)	Length
1.	"Taste"		2:57
2.	"Magnetic Baby"	Tranter	2:52
3.	"Semi Precious Weapons"	Tranter; Tasjan; Cole Whittle; Dan Crean; Joe McCanta	2:57
4.	"Bleed to Heal"		3:58
5.	"Genius"		5:05
6.	"Her Hair Is On Fire"		2:30
7.	"That's Kunt"		3:21
8.	"Jesus"	Tranter; Tasjan; Crean	3:19
9.	"Time Zones"		4:36
10.	"Rock N Roll Never Looked So Beautiful"		4:49
11.	"Magnetic Baby (radio version)" (bonus track)	Tranter	2:51
12.	"Her Hair Is On Fire (radio version)" (bonus track)		2:30

== Personnel ==
Semi Precious Weapons

- Justin Tranter – vocals
- Aaron Lee Tasjan – guitar, backing vocals
- Cole Whittle – bass
- Dan Crean – drums

Technical personnel

- Tony Visconti – executive producer
- Mario J. McNulty – producer, engineer, mixing
- Semi Precious Weapons – producer
- Brian Thorn – assistant engineer
- Artie Smith – drum technician
- George Marino – mastering
