= Andrew Combs (musician) =

American singer-songwriter

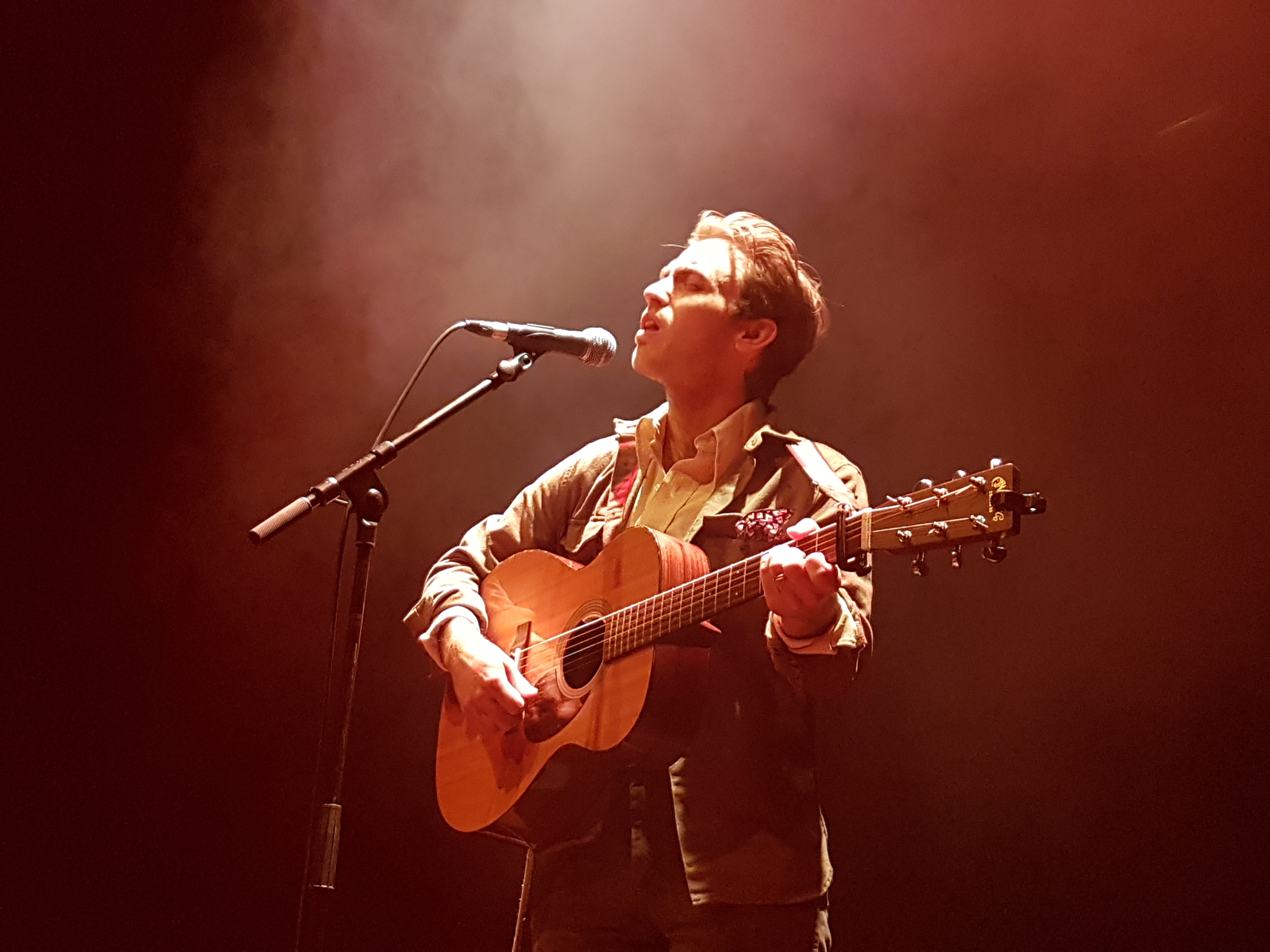
- Combs performing at the Heartland Festival in the Netherlands in 2018

Background information
- Born: Andrew Warriner Combs; December 19, 1986 (age 39); Dallas, Texas, United States
- Origin: Nashville, Tennessee, United States
- Genres: Country, Americana, Folk
- Occupations: Musician, singer-songwriter
- Instruments: Vocals, guitar
- Labels: Loose Music (Europe), SESAC, Coin Records
- Website: Official website

Andrew Warriner Combs (born December 19, 1986) is an American singer, songwriter, and guitarist from Dallas, Texas, who currently resides in Nashville, Tennessee.

== Career ==
Andrew Combs released his debut EP, Tennessee Time, in May 2010, which has been compared to Mickey Newbury and Guy Clark. In April 2012, Combs released a vinyl 7-inch called "Big Bad Love".

In July 2012, Combs signed to the Nashville-based music publishing arm of New York City record label, Razor & Tie.

In October 2012, Combs released Worried Man, which American Songwriter gave a 4-star review, writing: "As singer/songwriter first albums go, it'll be tough to beat this as one of the years finest, from a newcomer who is hopefully just tapping into his talent."

In 2013, Combs supported Shovels & Rope and Caitlin Rose on national tours and performed at the Newport Folk Festival

In 2015, Combs released All These Dreams, his second studio album.

In 2016, he performed on the main stage at the Country to Country festival in the UK alongside Chris Stapleton, Kacey Musgraves and Eric Church.

In 2022, Combs performed on the first compilation released by 3Sirens, an East Nashville based indie label founded by The Grahams. Appearing alongside Dylan LeBlanc, The Grahams and Caitlin Rose, Combs recorded a cover of Radiohead's 'High and Dry' for the special release.

== Discography ==
=== Studio albums ===
Year	Title	Tracks
2012	Worried Man	1. Devil's Got My Woman; 2. Please, Please, Please; 3. Heavy; 4. Big Bad Love; 5. Come Tomorrow; 6. Take It From Me; 7. Runnin' You Out of My Mind; 8. Too Stoned to Cry; 9. Why Oh Why; 10. Worried Man; 11. Lonely Side of Love
2015	All These Dreams	1. Rainy Day Song; 2. Nothing to Lose; 3. Foolin'; 4. Strange Bird; 5. Pearl; 6. Long Gone Lately; 7. In the Name of You; 8. All These Dreams; 9. Slow Road to Jesus; 10. Month of Bad Habits; 11. Suwannee County
2017	Canyons of My Mind	1. Heart of Wonder; 2. Sleepwalker; 3. Dirty Rain; 4. Hazel; 5. Rose Colored Blues; 6. Better Way; 7. Lauralee; 8. Blood Hunters; 9. Silk Flowers; 10. Bourgeois King; 11. What It Means to You
2019	Ideal Man	1. Stars of Longing; 2. Ideal Man; 3. Like a Feather; 4. Save Somebody Else; 5. Hide and Seek; 6. Dry Eyes; 7. Firestarter; 8. Shipwreck Man; 9. Born Without a Clue; 10. The Stone; 11. Golden; 12. Lola Marie (Demo)
2022	Sundays	1. (God)less; 2. Anna Please; 3. Mark of the Man; 4. Still Water; 5. The Ship; 6. Truth and Love; 7. Adeline; 8. Down Among the Dead; 9. Drivel to a Dream; 10. I See Me; 11. Shall We Go
2024	Dream Pictures	1. Fly in My Wine; 2. Eventide; 3. Point Across; 4. Heavy the Heart; 5. Mary Gold; 6. Your Eyes and Me; 7. Genuine and Pure; 8. I'm Fine; 9. Table for Blue; 10. To Love; 11. The Sea in Me; 12. Dream Pictures

=== Extended plays ===
Year	Title	Tracks
2010	Tennessee Time	1. Hummingbird; 2. Tennessee Time; 3. Too Stoned to Cry; 4. Wanderin' Heart; 5. Won't Catch Me
2018	5 Covers & a Song	1. 4 X 10 (Loudon Wainwright III cover); 2. Reptilia (The Strokes cover); 3. You and Whose Army? (Radiohead cover); 4. Don't Tell Our Friends About Me (Blake Mills cover); 5. I Envy the Wind (Lucinda Williams cover); 6. Expectations (original song)
2020	This Is the Light (Quarantine EP)	1. Your Light, Your Love; 2. This Is the Light; 3. Fire Escape; 4. To Love Someone; 5. Through the Glass

=== Singles ===
Year	Song	Album
2012	Big Bad Love	Worried Man
2012	Take It From Me	Worried Man
2013	Emily	Non-album single
2014	Foolin'	All These Dreams
2020	In and Out of Love (with Wilderwater)	One (Wilderwater EP)
2022	High and Dry (Radiohead cover)	The Bends (Radiohead album)
2022	In Front of Us (with Ali Sperry)	In Front of Us (Ali Sperry album)
