= You Love You =

Studio album by Semi Precious Weapons
- Released: June 29, 2010
- Recorded: 2009–2010
- Genre: Glam rock, garage rock, alternative rock
- Label: Interscope, Geffen
- Producer: Lady Gaga (executive), Tony Visconti, Ron Fair (executive)

Semi Precious Weapons chronology
We Love You (2008)	You Love You (2010)	Aviation (2014)

Singles from You Love You
- 1. "Semi Precious Weapons" Released: January 19, 2010; 2. "Magnetic Baby" Released: July 30, 2010; 3. "Look At Me" Released: September 2010

Professional ratings
Aggregate scores
Source	Rating
Metacritic	71/100
Review scores
Source	Rating
AllMusic	4/5 stars
Alternative Press	3/5 stars
idobi	4/5 stars
BBC Music	favorable

You Love You is the second studio album of American glam rock band Semi Precious Weapons. It was released on June 29, 2010 by Interscope Records.

== Reception ==
You Love You received mixed to positive reviews from critics upon release. On Metacritic, the album holds a score of 71/100 based on 4 reviews, indicating "generally favorable reviews".

== Track listing ==
All lyrics are written by Justin Tranter.

No.	Title	Music	Length
1.	"Semi Precious Weapons"	Tranter; Aaron Lee Tasjan; Cole Whittle; Stevy Pyne; Dan Crean; Joe McCanta	3:06
2.	"Put a Diamond In It"	Tranter; Whittle; Pyne; Crean	3:09
3.	"Magnetic Baby"	Tranter	2:44
4.	"Statues of Ourselves"	Tranter	4:33
5.	"Sticky With Champagne"	Tranter; Whittle; Pyne; Crean	3:17
6.	"I Could Die"	Tranter; Whittle; Pyne; Crean	2:36
7.	"Leave Your Pretty to Me"	Tranter	4:24
8.	"Rock n Roll Never Looked So Beautiful"	Tranter; Tasjan	5:46
9.	"Look At Me"	Tranter; Whittle; Pyne; Crean	3:37
10.	"Her Hair Is On Fire" (iTunes bonus track)	Tranter; Tasjan	2:29

== Personnel ==
Semi Precious Weapons

- Justin Tranter – vocals
- Cole Whittle – bass
- Stevy Pyne – guitar
- Dan Crean – drums

Technical personnel

- Jack Joseph Puig – producer, engineer, mixing
- Semi Precious Weapons – producer
- Lady Gaga – executive producer
- Joe Corey – assistant engineer
- Dan Chase – assistant engineer
- Rouble Kapoor – assistant engineer
- Ted Jensen – mastering
