= Cazimi =

2022 Caitlin Rose studio album

Studio album by Caitlin Rose
- Released: November 18, 2022
- Genre: Country
- Length: 42:37
- Language: English
- Labels: Missing Piece; Names
- Producers: Jordan Lehning; Caitlin Rose

Caitlin Rose chronology
The Stand-In (2013)	Cazimi (2022)

Cazimi is an album by American country musician Caitlin Rose, released by Missing Piece and Names on November 18, 2022. The album is Rose's first in almost a decade and has received positive reviews.

== Recording and release ==
Cazimi is Rose's first album in almost a decade, begun at the very beginning of the COVID-19 pandemic and produced for over two years. Previous recording sessions were unfruitful and Rose entered a creative period where she considered quitting music altogether. The release was formally announced in August 2022, with a preview of the track "Black Obsidian", and Rose had previously introduced a music video for "Only Lies" in December 2021. Rose had taken an extended hiatus from performing after losing the joy of it, but she continued writing songs. "Getting It Right" was written around 2014 and "Nobody's Sweetheart" was written in 2016. When she isn't having fun with music, she characterizes her work as "garbage", so she waited until she had the creative spark and an arrangement of musician friends who could finalize the album. The music on Cazimi draws from all of Rose's varied musical interests and influences and she co-produced the album with Jordan Lehning to have a pop quality.

== Critical reception ==
Professional ratings
Aggregate scores
Source	Rating
Metacritic	79/100
Review scores
Source	Rating
AllMusic	4/5 stars
American Songwriter	3/5 stars
The Line of Best Fit	7/10
Paste	7.3/10
Pitchfork	7.5/10
PopMatters	7/10

According to the review aggregator Metacritic, Cazimi received "generally favorable reviews" based on a weighted average score of 79 out of 100 from nine critic scores. Reviewing the album for AllMusic, Mark Deming claimed that "it plays to [Rose's] strengths with an ideal balance of solid craft and relatable humanity." For Pitchfork, Brad Shoup gave Cazimi a 7.5 out of 10, citing Rose's growth as a songwriter, who can pull from various genres to create a complete song cycle. In Paste, Ellen Johnson scored this release a 7.3 out of 10, noting Rose's "shimmery new sound" and ability to weave multiple genres into country-based music. John Amen of The Line of Best Fit praised the maturity of Rose's lyrics and her ability to offer "a down-to-earth yet reassuring message, expressing faith in our collective resilience"; he rated Cazimi seven out of 10. Hal Horowitz of American Songwriter gave this album three out of five stars, also pointing out the depth of Rose's storytelling, but noting that "songs often don't feel organic or warm which, with lyrics that are self-reflective, makes some selections seem stiff, pushed too close for the radio play they are reaching for". Steve Horowitz in PopMatters calls this collection "sort of a sonic impressionist painting" where "the blurring [of genres and styles] is intentional and purposeful" and gave the release a seven out of 10. Stereogum named this "Album of the Week", with reviewer Chris Deville praising the songwriting, vocals, and additional musicians, declaring that "each song is a standalone marvel unto itself".

== Track listing ==
1. "Carried Away" – 4:17
2. "Modern Dancing" – 3:38
3. "Getting It Right" – 2:50
4. "Nobody's Sweetheart" (Caitlin Rose and Daniel Tashian) – 3:45
5. "Lil' Vesta" – 3:08
6. "Black Obsidian" – 3:05
7. "How Far Away" – 4:12
8. "Blameless" – 3:39
9. "Gemini Moon" – 3:54
10. "Holdin'" – 3:07
11. "All Right (Baby's Got a Way)" – 3:09
12. "Only Lies" – 3:53

== Personnel ==
- Caitlin Rose – vocals, production
- Courtney Marie Andrews – vocals on "Getting It Right"
- John Baldwin – mastering
- Ethan Ballinger – guitar
- Eli Beaird – bass guitar
- Dom Billett – drums, percussion
- Joe Costa – engineering, mixing
- Spencer Cullum – pedal steel guitar
- Anthony Da Costa – guitar
- Fetzer Design – design
- Jeremy Fetzer – guitar
- Ian Fitchuk – drums
- Austin Hoke – cello
- Chris Hundo – sleeve photography
- William Johnson – cover photography
- Brian Kotzur – drums, percussion
- Jack Lawrence – bass guitar
- Jordan Lehning – acoustic guitar, bass guitar, keyboards, piano, percussion, backing vocals, production
- Ian Miller – piano
- Zachary Reynolds – co-engineering
- Jerry Roe – drums, percussion
- Luke Schneider – pedal steel guitar, guitar
- Sean Thompson – guitar
- William Tyler – acoustic guitar

== See also ==
- Lists of 2022 albums
