= The Stand-In (album) =

Studio album by Caitlin Rose
- Released: March 5, 2013
- Genre: Country; pop rock
- Length: 39:28
- Label: ATO
- Producer: Jordan Lehning; Caitlin Rose; Skylar Wilson

Caitlin Rose chronology
| Own Side Now (2010) | The Stand-In (2013) | Cazimi (2022) |

The Stand-In is the third studio album by American country-pop rock artist Caitlin Rose. The album was released on March 5, 2013 on the ATO Records label. The producers on the album are Jordan Lehning, Caitlin Rose and Skylar Wilson.

== Critical reception ==
Professional ratings
Aggregate scores
| Source | Rating |
|---|---|
| AnyDecentMusic? | 7.6/10 |
| Metacritic | 79/100 |
Review scores
| Source | Rating |
| AllMusic | 4/5 stars |
| American Songwriter | 4/5 stars |
| The Guardian | 4/5 stars |
| The Independent | 4/5 stars |
| NME | 8/10 |
| Pitchfork | 7.0/10 |
| Q | 3/5 stars |
| The Skinny | 4/5 stars |
| Spin | 9/10 |
| Uncut | 9/10 |

The Stand-In received generally favorable reviews from music critics. At Metacritic, which assigns a weighted average score out of 100 to ratings and reviews from selected mainstream critics, the album received a score of 79 based on 22 reviews. At AnyDecentMusic?, which assigns a weighted average rating out-of-ten to selected mainstream critics ratings and reviews, the album has a rating of 7.6 based on 23 reviews.

AllMusic's Steve Leggett found that "Rose isn't trying to be all traditional country here, or even all straight pop either, but somehow she effortlessly melts the two together, and this set is definitely a winner, full of solid playing and, of course, Rose's easy and comfortingly wise vocals." In addition, Nate Cavalieri of Spin said that listeners should not see the album as "a collection of mothball-scented nostalgia, or Rose for a paint-by-numbers retro-fetishist." In agreement, Chris Buckle of The Skinny wrote that the album contains "fuller arrangements [which] at times move Rose closer to her more mainstream modern country contemporaries, not further. But throughout, the songwriting remains distinguished and immaculately pitched". Consequence of Sound's Erin Carson wrote that "Rose channels a vintage vibe without being a total throwback record. She has a tone that melds well with silky background vocals and just enough pedal steel." Dave Simpson of The Guardian commented on Rose's old style, writing: "A smidgeon of Rose's old spikiness is sacrificed, but it's easily a fair swap for songs bulging with terrific hooks and killer choruses, all of which belie some melancholy content."

musicOMH's David Muller cautioned that "Those who were endeared by Rose’s debut may be surprised, hopefully pleasantly, by the change in tone and attitude shown on The Stand-In. Nevertheless, it is a delightful record." Similarly, Drowned in Sound's Jon Clark highlighted the fact that "Despite this run of two poor(ish) songs, the album is largely excellent--a record bridging the gap between country music and popular music’s less derided genres perfectly." To this, Benjamin Boles of Now surmised that "Most of the tracks could be singles, successfully marrying a pop sensibility to country twang without sacrificing the best aspects of either approach." Lastly, Hal Horowitz of American Songwriter proclaimed that "With an album as consistently strong as The Stand-In at this early stage, she has an impressive career ahead." This is because of what Rob Hughes of Uncut found with "The Stand-In has everything that made its predecessor special – big voice, expertly crafted tunes, clever backings, a deft mix of stridency and restraint – but is definitely a step up."

== Track listing ==
| No. | Title | Writer(s) | Length |
|---|---|---|---|
| 1. | "No One to Call" | Jordan Lehning; Caitlin Rose; Skylar Wilson | 2:37 |
| 2. | "I Was Cruel" | Matt Campbell | 3:33 |
| 3. | "Waitin'" | Mark Fredson; Lehning; Rose; Wilson | 3:19 |
| 4. | "Only a Clown" | Rose | 3:37 |
| 5. | "Pink Champagne" | Lehning; Rose; Wilson | 4:05 |
| 6. | "Dallas" | Ian Felice | 3:46 |
| 7. | "Golden Boy" | Rose | 3:44 |
| 8. | "Everywhere I Go" | Lehning; Rose | 3:10 |
| 9. | "Silver Sings" | Rose | 2:56 |
| 10. | "When I'm Gone" | Lehning; Rose; Wilson | 3:28 |
| 11. | "Menagerie" | Lehning; Rose; Wilson | 2:42 |
| 12. | "Old Numbers" | Lehning; Rose; Wilson | 2:31 |
| Total length: | | | 39:28 |

== Charts ==
| Chart (2013) | Peak position |
|---|---|
| US Heatseekers Albums (Billboard) | 29 |
| US Top Country Albums (Billboard) | 42 |
