= Justin Tranter =

American musician and activist (born 1980)

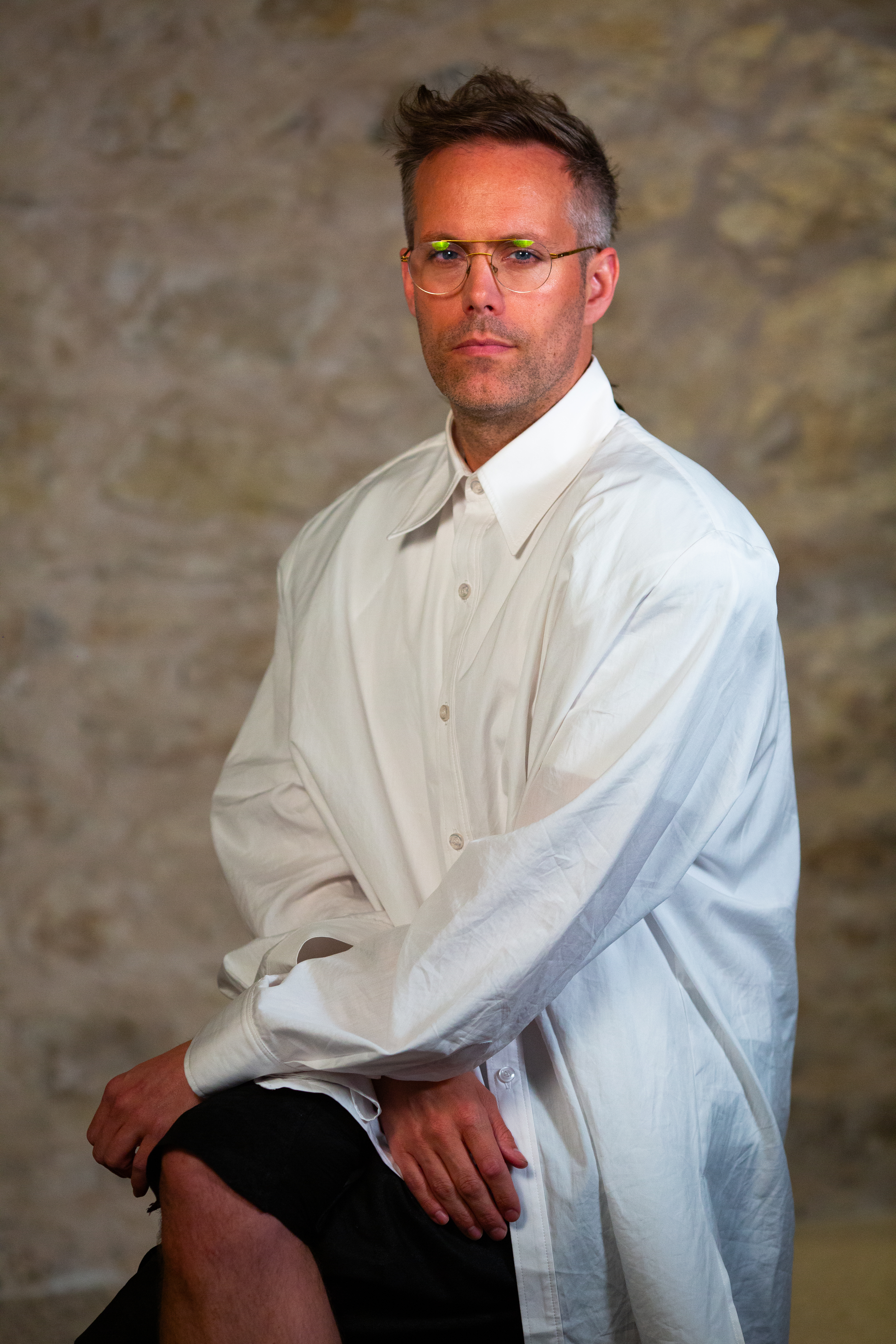
- Tranter at SXSW 2024
- Born: Justin Drew Tranter; June 16, 1980 (age 46); Hawthorn Woods, Illinois, U.S.
- Occupations: Songwriter; singer; activist
- Years active: 2002–present
- Musical career
- Origin: Lake Zurich, Illinois, U.S.
- Genres: Pop; rock
- Labels: Razor & Tie; Interscope; Geffen; Cherrytree; Epic
- Formerly of: Semi Precious Weapons

Signature
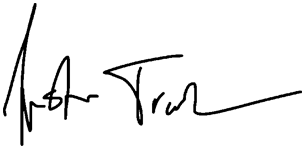

Justin Drew Tranter (born June 16, 1980) is an American songwriter, singer, and activist. They (Note: Tranter uses both he/him and they/them pronouns but has expressed a preference for the latter. This article uses they/them for consistency.) co-founded the New York City-based rock band Semi Precious Weapons, of which they were the lead singer, in 2004. The band released three studio albums before disbanding in 2014. Since the breakup of Semi Precious Weapons, Tranter has focused on songwriting, establishing a close writing partnership with Julia Michaels and working primarily with pop singers. Tranter's highest-certified songs include tracks for Justin Bieber, DNCE, Selena Gomez, Halsey, Imagine Dragons, Maroon 5, Bebe Rexha, Gwen Stefani, and Hailee Steinfeld. As of October 2025, songs written by Tranter have garnered over 70 billion streams; their single sales were estimated at 50 million as of May 2021.

Tranter has received multiple accolades for their songwriting work, including two BMI Pop Awards for Pop Songwriter of the Year in 2017 and 2018 and a nomination for the Grammy Award for Songwriter of the Year, Non-Classical in 2024. Two songs they co-wrote, Michaels's "Issues" (2017) and Chappell Roan's "Good Luck, Babe!" (2024), were nominated for the Grammy Award for Song of the Year. They have written music for film and television, earning a Golden Globe Award for Best Original Song nomination for "Home" (2017) performed by Nick Jonas. Tranter is also an advocate for multiple causes, particularly LGBT rights, and was a board member of GLAAD for multiple years starting in 2017.

== Early life ==
Justin Drew Tranter was born and grew up in Hawthorn Woods, Illinois. They have three older brothers. Tranter says that they experienced bullying during their youth, which caused them to be transferred from the Lake Zurich public high school to the Chicago Academy for the Arts after a semester. While studying musical theater at the Academy, they started the AIDS Benefit, an annual show run by students to raise awareness for HIV/AIDS. Tranter graduated in 1998. Following this, they studied at the Berklee College of Music in Boston. Along with songwriting, they also took classes in business management. While at Berklee, they founded Musicians with a Mission, a scholarship fund for LGBT youth education.

== Musical career ==
=== 2002–2004: Career beginnings ===
Tranter released their debut studio album Scratched in 2002 and followed it up with their second studio album Tear Me Together in 2004.

=== 2004–2014: Semi Precious Weapons ===
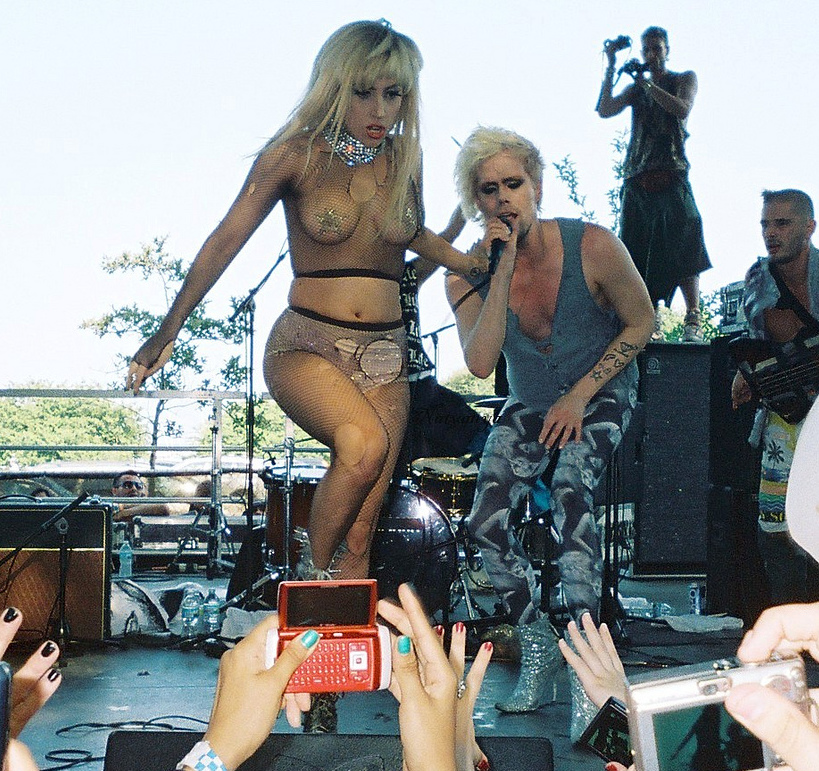
Semi Precious Weapons performing with Lady Gaga at Lollapalooza 2010

In 2004, following the release of Tear Me Together, Tranter formed the band Semi Precious Weapons in New York with fellow Berklee graduates Cole Whittle, Dan Crean, and Aaron Lee Tasjan; Tasjan was later replaced by Stevy Pyne. The band's debut studio album We Love You was released in 2008 and the band subsequently opened for Lady Gaga on her Monster Ball Tour from 2009 to 2011. Semi Precious Weapons released two more albums, You Love You (2010) and Aviation (2014), before disbanding in 2014. While still part of Semi Precious Weapons, Tranter moved to Los Angeles and signed a publishing deal with Warner Chappell Music in 2012 to write songs for other artists.

=== 2014–present: Focus on songwriting ===
After signing with Warner Chappell, Tranter began working with artists such as Justin Bieber, Selena Gomez, Hailee Steinfeld, Fifth Harmony, and Fall Out Boy. In December 2015, Tranter was named one of the "20 Biggest Breakouts of 2015" by Rolling Stone for their songwriting contributions to the pop charts of that year. Tranter frequently collaborates with Julia Michaels and multiple songs co-written by the pair have appeared on Billboard charts; two such tracks, Gomez's "Good for You" and Bieber's "Sorry", topped the Mainstream Top 40. Tranter and Michaels also teamed up to co-write Gwen Stefani's third solo studio album This Is What the Truth Feels Like (2016). Tranter has since written for artists ranging from Britney Spears and Demi Lovato to Imagine Dragons and Linkin Park. Their songwriting work on Michaels's song "Issues" earned Tranter a Song of the Year nomination at the 2018 Grammy Awards.

Tranter has worked on music for film and television. They co-wrote the song "Home" performed by Nick Jonas for the soundtrack to the animated film Ferdinand (2017), which earned Tranter a nomination for the Golden Globe Award for Best Original Song at the 2018 ceremony. They also co-wrote "Hindsight", the end title song for Billy Eichner's film Bros (2022). Furthermore, Tranter was an executive producer and songwriter for the soundtracks to the Hulu film Happiest Season (2020), Billy Porter's directorial debut Anything's Possible, the Netflix film Purple Hearts (both 2022), the Paramount+ Grease prequel television series Grease: Rise of the Pink Ladies (2023), and Larin Sullivan's film The Young King.

Tranter was nominated for Songwriter of the Year, Non-Classical at the 2024 Grammy Awards for their work on songs by Reneé Rapp, Måneskin, Marisa Davila, Baby Tate, Talk, and Miley Cyrus. At the 2025 ceremony, Tranter received their second Song of the Year nomination for Chappell Roan's "Good Luck, Babe!", which they co-wrote with Roan and Dan Nigro. The three had previously collaborated on the track "My Kink Is Karma" from Roan's debut studio album The Rise and Fall of a Midwest Princess (2023).

== Advocacy ==
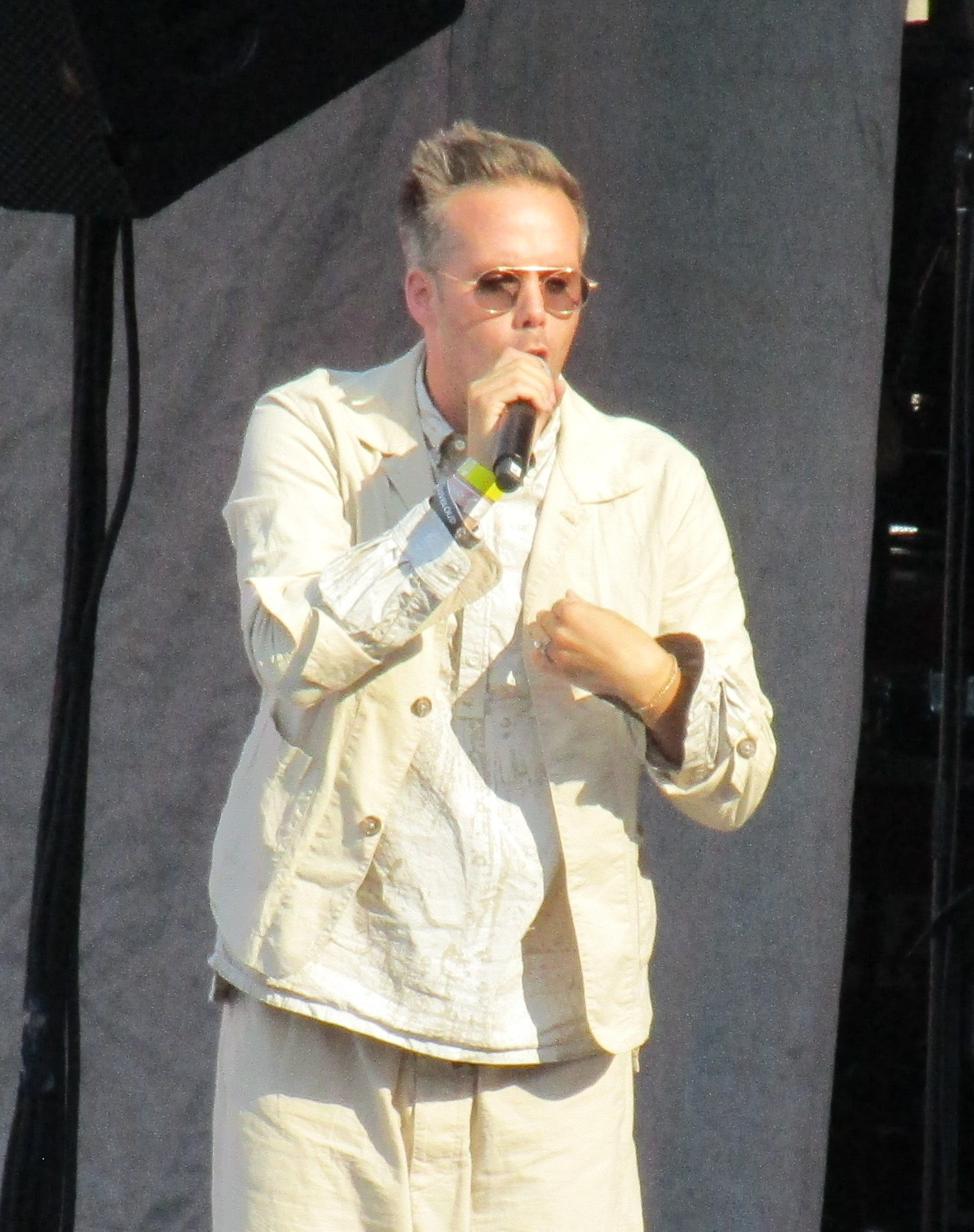
Tranter performing at the 2018 edition of LoveLoud, a fundraising festival for LGBT youth

Tranter's activism began in high school at the Chicago Academy for the Arts, where they created the annual AIDS Benefit to raise awareness for HIV/AIDS. This was followed by Musicians with a Mission, a scholarship fund for LGBT youth education that Tranter founded while attending the Berklee College of Music.

Tranter flew to Orlando to help in the aftermath of the 2016 Pulse nightclub shooting. They also co-wrote and co-organized the release of the charity single "Hands" to raise funds for Equality Florida's Pulse Victims Fund, GLAAD, and the GLBT Community Center of Central Florida.

In February 2017, Tranter joined GLAAD's National Board of Directors. During the GLAAD Media Awards of that year, Tranter raised $123,000 for the organization by auctioning off four individual songwriting and recording sessions. Each year, Tranter hosts an in-person Spirit Day concert to raise funds for GLAAD's efforts to support LGBT youth. The fourth annual event in 2022 raised $400,000.

Tranter is also a supporter of Mercy for Animals and stopped eating meat in 1994. They are an advocate for fairer payment of songwriters in the music streaming era.

On November 17, 2019, Tranter was honored with the ACLU of Southern California's Bill of Rights Award for their activist work as "an outspoken and powerful voice for the LGBTQIA+ community, diversity, the climate crisis, arts education, animal rights, and ending gun violence".

== Personal life ==
Tranter is bisexual, gender nonconforming, and non-binary. They have stated that, with regard to pronouns, "they/them/theirs is what I relate to the most" but that they do not mind other pronouns such as he/him.

== Other ventures ==
Tranter's jewelry company, Fetty, grew out of necklaces they designed to sell as merchandise for the Semi Precious Weapons shows. Fetty sold at retailers such as Urban Outfitters and Barneys. The designs typically feature hearts and weapons. In 2008, Tranter designed a limited-edition sneaker for DKNY.

Tranter is the founder and CEO of Facet Records and Publishing, which looks after a roster of artists, songwriters, and producers.

=== Television and film appearances ===
In 2008, Tranter appeared as a guest on the E! cable network show Chelsea Lately. In December of the same year, they served as a coach on the MTV reality show Made, in which they helped a young girl transform into a "rock star". In 2010, Tranter and their fellow Semi Precious Weapons members had cameo appearances in Lady Gaga's music video for "Telephone". In 2012, Tranter was interviewed for the documentary feature film Jobriath A.D. about rock musician Jobriath.

== Awards and nominations ==
Year	Award	Work	Category	Result	Ref.
2003	Outmusic Awards	"Blend In"	Out Song of the Year	Won	
2017	BMI Pop Awards	Themself	Pop Songwriter of the Year	Won	
2018	Golden Globe Awards	"Home"	Best Original Song	Nominated	
2018	Grammy Awards	"Issues"	Song of the Year	Nominated	
2018	BMI Pop Awards	Themself	Pop Songwriter of the Year	Won	
2019	ACLU Bill of Rights Dinner	Themself	Bill of Rights Award	Won	
2024	Grammy Awards	Themself	Songwriter of the Year, Non-Classical	Nominated	
2025	Grammy Awards	"Good Luck, Babe!"	Song of the Year	Nominated	

== Discography ==
=== Solo ===
- Scratched (2002)
- Tear Me Together (2004)

=== Semi Precious Weapons ===
- We Love You (2008)
- You Love You (2010)
- Aviation (2014)

=== Featured appearances ===
Year	Title	Album
2013	"Endwell" (Bleu featuring Justin Tranter and Mike Taylor)	To Hell with You
2015	"Our World" (Shapov featuring Justin Tranter)	Axtone Ten
2016	"Tied to You" (The Knocks featuring Justin Tranter)	55

=== Soundtrack appearances ===
Title	Year	Album
"Forever"	2017	The Lego Batman Movie: Original Motion Picture Soundtrack
