= Swimmin' Time =

Studio album by Shovels & Rope
- Released: August 26, 2014
- Length: 54:10
- Label: Dualtone

Shovels & Rope chronology
O' Be Joyful (2012)	Swimmin' Time (2014)	Busted Jukebox Vol. 1 (2015)

Professional ratings
Aggregate scores
Source	Rating
Metacritic	74/100
Review scores
Source	Rating
AllMusic	3.5/5 stars
Blurt	4/5 stars
Consequence of Sound	C+
Exclaim!	9/10
Paste	8.2/10

Swimmin' Time is the third studio album by American duo Shovels & Rope. It was released on August 26, 2014, under Dualtone Records.

A tour, in support of the album, was also announced.

== Critical reception ==
Swimmin' Time was met with generally favorable reviews from critics. At Metacritic, which assigns a weighted average rating out of 100 to reviews from mainstream publications, this release received an average score of 74, based on 11 reviews.

=== Year-end list ===
Accolades for Swimmin' Time
Publication	Accolade	Rank	Ref.
PopMatters	Top 80 Albums of 2014	39	

== Track listing ==
Swimmin' Time track listing
No.	Title	Length
1.	"The Devil Is All Around"	4:02
2.	"Bridge on Fire"	3:46
3.	"Evil"	5:27
4.	"After the Storm"	6:22
5.	"Fish Assassin"	1:23
6.	"Coping Mechanism"	3:53
7.	"Pinned"	4:01
8.	"Swimmin' Time"	3:59
9.	"Stono River Blues"	3:14
10.	"Ohio"	5:02
11.	"Mary Ann & One Eyed Dan"	3:15
12.	"Save the World"	2:49
13.	"Thresher"	6:57

iTunes Deluxe version
No.	Title	Length
14.	"The Ice Will Melt" (Bonus track)	2:42
15.	"Oh Lonely" (Bonus track)	4:18

== Charts ==
Chart performance for Swimmin' Time
Chart (2014)	Peak position
US Billboard 200	21
US Americana/Folk Albums (Billboard)	1
US Independent Albums (Billboard)	6
US Top Rock Albums (Billboard)	5
