= All These Dreams =

Studio album by Andrew Combs
- Released: March 3, 2015
- Genre: Americana
- Length: 39:09
- Label: Coin, Loose

Andrew Combs chronology
Worried Man (2012)	All These Dreams (2015)	Canyons of My Mind (2017)

Professional ratings
Aggregate scores
Source	Rating
Metacritic	77/100
Review scores
Source	Rating
AllMusic	4/5 stars
American Songwriter	4/5 stars

All These Dreams is the second studio album by American musician Andrew Combs. It was released on 26 January 2015 in Europe through Loose, then released throughout the rest of the world in March 2015 under Coin Records.

== Track listing ==
No.	Title	Length
1.	"Rainy Day Song"	3:21
2.	"Nothing to Lose"	3:54
3.	"Foolin'"	3:36
4.	"Strange Bird"	2:34
5.	"Pearl"	4:27
6.	"Long Gone Lately"	3:34
7.	"In the Name of You"	2:47
8.	"All These Dreams"	3:35
9.	"Slow Road to Jesus"	3:03
10.	"Month of Bad Habits"	4:29
11.	"Suwannee County"	3:49
