= Aviation (album) =

Studio album by Semi Precious Weapons
- Released: April 22, 2014
- Recorded: 2011–2013
- Genre: Alternative rock
- Label: RedZone
- Producer: Justin Tranter, Tricky Stewart, Axident, Mike Green, Cole Whittle, Stevy Pyne, Daniel Crean

Semi Precious Weapons chronology
You Love You (2010)	Aviation (2014)

Singles from Aviation
- 1. "Aviation High" Released: February 13, 2013

Professional ratings
Review scores
Source	Rating
AllMusic	4/5 stars

Aviation is the third and final studio album of the New York-based alternative rock band Semi Precious Weapons. It was released on April 22, 2014 by RedZone Records.

== Track listing ==
Aviation
No.	Title	Writer(s)	Length
1.	"Aviation High"	Justin Tranter; Stevy Pyne; Cole Whittle; Dan Crean; Andreas Schuller	3:56
2.	"Look To The Stars"	Tranter; Pyne; Whittle; Crean; Mike Green	4:34
3.	"Drink"	Tranter; Pyne; Whittle; Crean	4:10
4.	"Never Going Home"	Tranter; Pyne; Whittle; Crean	4:05
5.	"Scream To The Sky"	Tranter; Pyne; Whittle; Crean; Schuller	3:14
6.	"Young Love"	Tranter; Pyne; Whittle; Crean; Green; Ian Kirkpatrick	3:34
7.	"That's My Friends"	Tranter; Pyne; Whittle; Crean	4:04
8.	"Healed"	Tranter; Pyne; Whittle; Crean	4:04
9.	"Cherries On Ice"	Tranter; Pyne; Whittle; Crean; Danny Garibay	3:53
10.	"Free Booze"	Tranter; Pyne; Whittle; Crean; Danny Garibay	3:26
11.	"Vegas"	Tranter; Pyne; Whittle; Crean; Stefan Forrest	2:55
12.	"Hands Up"	Tranter; Pyne; Whittle; Crean	3:56
