= The Ceremonies (band) =

American rock band

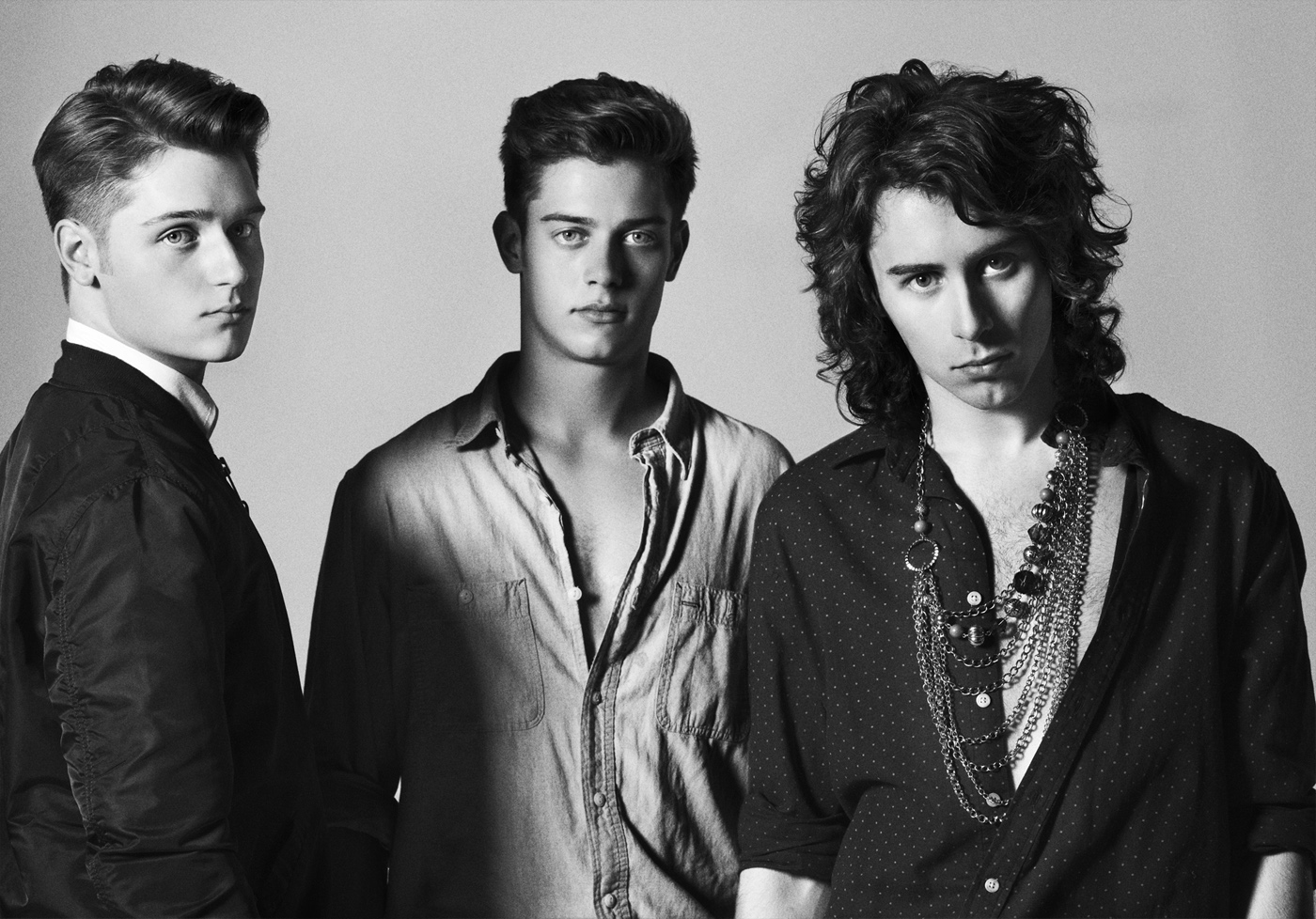
- The Ceremonies Performing Live, June 2013

Background information
- Origin: Los Angeles, California, USA
- Genres: Indie rock, new wave, alternative rock, post-punk, art rock, psychedelic pop
- Years active: 2012–present
- Labels: Atom Factory Music, Capitol Records
- Members: Matthew R. Cook; Mark N. Cook; Michael B. Cook; Kane "cardboard" Ritchotte; Jackson Mississippi White
- Website: theceremonies.com

The Ceremonies are an American rock band from Los Angeles, California. The Ceremonies’ sound has been described as ‘80s New Wave nostalgia meets cutting-edge alternative rock. The three members, brothers Matthew R Cook (age 25), Mark N Cook (age 22), and Michael B Cook (age 22), formed the band in 2010. They did not, however, release any music until late 2012. Used to be managed by Troy Carter (Lady Gaga, John Legend). The band was the first artist signed to the joint label between Atom Factory Entertainment and Capitol Records.

== History ==
The Ceremonies performing live, June 2013

The Cook Brothers grew up in Los Angeles. Matthew is the eldest of the three, and Mark and Michael are fraternal twins. Inspired by their favorite poems, novels, philosophies, and songs, the trio called themselves "The Ceremonies," which they say are "communal gatherings where people come together to experience the entire spectrum of emotion." Matthew, The Ceremonies' musical architect and lyricist, showed some of his early demos to producer Danny Garibay. Garibay eventually brought the music to Troy Carter who went on to sign the band to his company, Atom Factory Entertainment, in 2012. In 2013, Atom Factory Entertainment teamed with Capitol Music Group to form Atom Factory Music. The Ceremonies are the first artists signed to this joint label.

== Musical and visual style ==
Some of their influences include ’80s post-punk pioneers Echo and The Bunnymen, The Smiths, and The Cure. Matthew cites the poets William Blake and William Wordsworth, and British futurist writer Aldous Huxley as major writing inspirations.

== The Ceremonies EP ==
The Ceremonies self-titled debut EP was released on October 8th, 2013. The group released an official music video for the EP's lead single, "Land Of Gathering", which debuted on MTV networks as part of "Artists To Watch". The song has been described as a conflagration of pounding drums and live-wire energy.

== Discography ==
=== Singles ===
- Land Of Gathering (2013) Atom Factory Music/Capitol Records
- Lovecaught (2016) Atom Factory Music/Capitol Records

=== EP releases ===
- The Ceremonies (EP) (2013) Atom Factory Music/Capitol Records
