= Michael Trent =

American musician (born 1977)

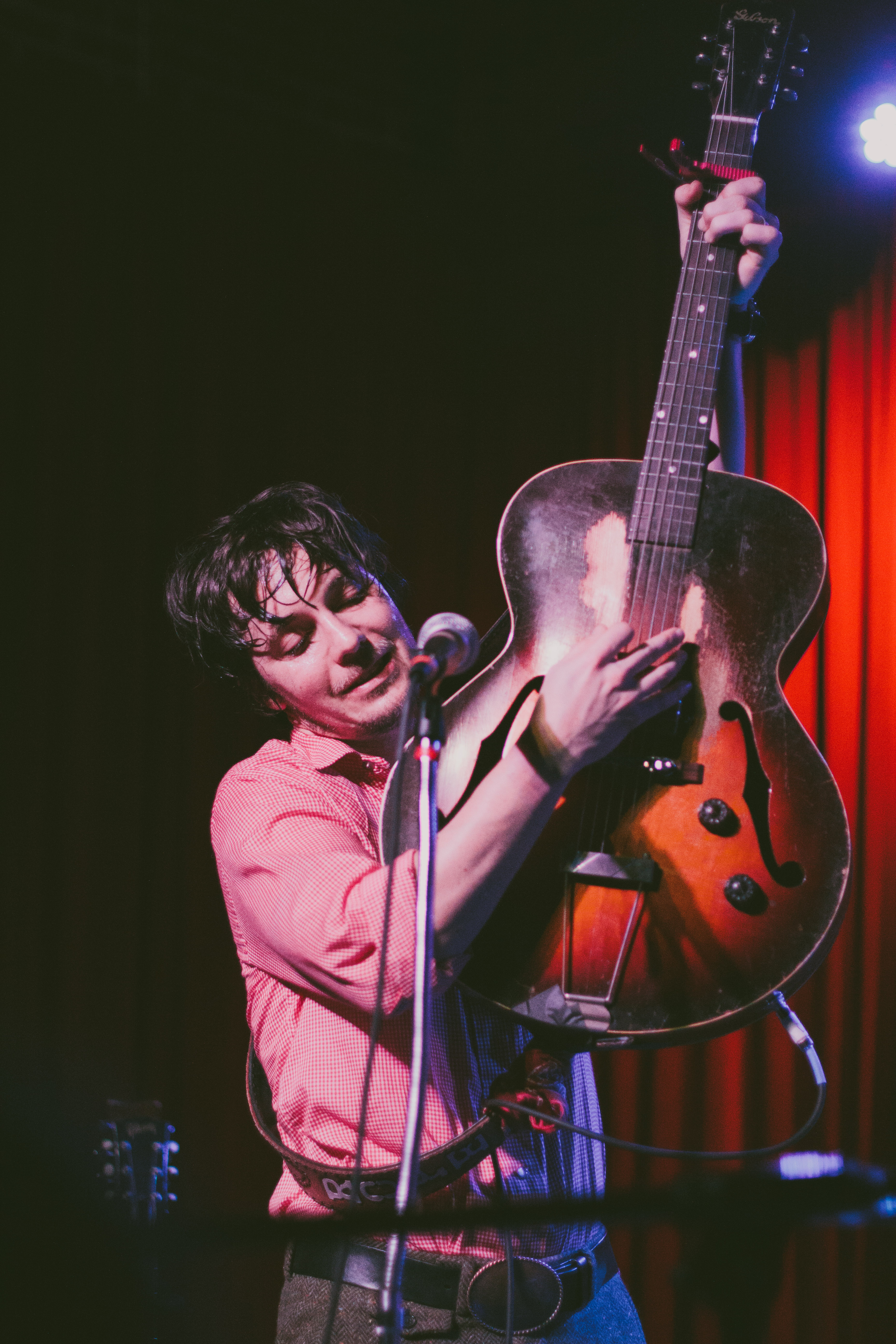
- Michael Trent

Background information
- Born: Michael Trent Robinson; October 20, 1977 (age 49); Denver, Colorado, US
- Genres: Folk, country rock
- Occupations: Singer-songwriter, musician
- Instruments: Vocals; guitar; drums; harmonica
- Labels: Shrimp Records, Dualtone,
- Website: shovelsandrope.com

Michael Trent (born October 20, 1977) is an American musician from Denver. He performs as a solo act and in the band Shovels & Rope since 2008.

== Career ==
Trent first performed as the lead singer in the Denver, Colorado band Tinker's Punishment, before moving to the Southeast and renaming as The Films with Kenneth Harris, Jacob Sinclair and Adam Blake in Charleston, South Carolina. The group disbanded in 2010.

Trent collaborated with Butch Walker, performing two of his albums. He then released two solo albums.

Trent recorded an album as a duo with his wife, Cary Ann Hearst, in 2008. The pair then formed the group Shovels and Rope and began touring, performing about 200 shows each year. In 2012 the couple released a second album, "O Be Joyful"

== Discography ==
=== Solo studio albums ===
Title	Album details
Michael Trent	Release date: November 26, 2007; Label: Our House Records
The Winner	Release date: April 20, 2010; Label: Shrimp Records

=== Credits ===
Album title	Artist	Credits
Duke Tumatoe & the Power Trio (2003)	Duke Tumatoe	Choir/Chorus
I Liked It Better When You Had No Heart (2010)	Butch Walker	Composer, Lyricist, Vocals (Background)
The Spade (2011)	Butch Walker	Composer, Vocals (Background)
O' Be Joyful (2012)	Shovels & Rope	Group Member, Instrumentation, Producer
Divided & United: Songs of the Civil War (2013)		Producer
Swimmin' Time (2014)	Shovels & Rope	Composer, Engineer, Instrumentation, Producer
Rivers in the Wasteland (2014)	Needtobreathe	Arranger, Guitar (Acoustic), Guitar (Electric), Vocals (Background)
