= Shovels & Rope =

American folk rock duo

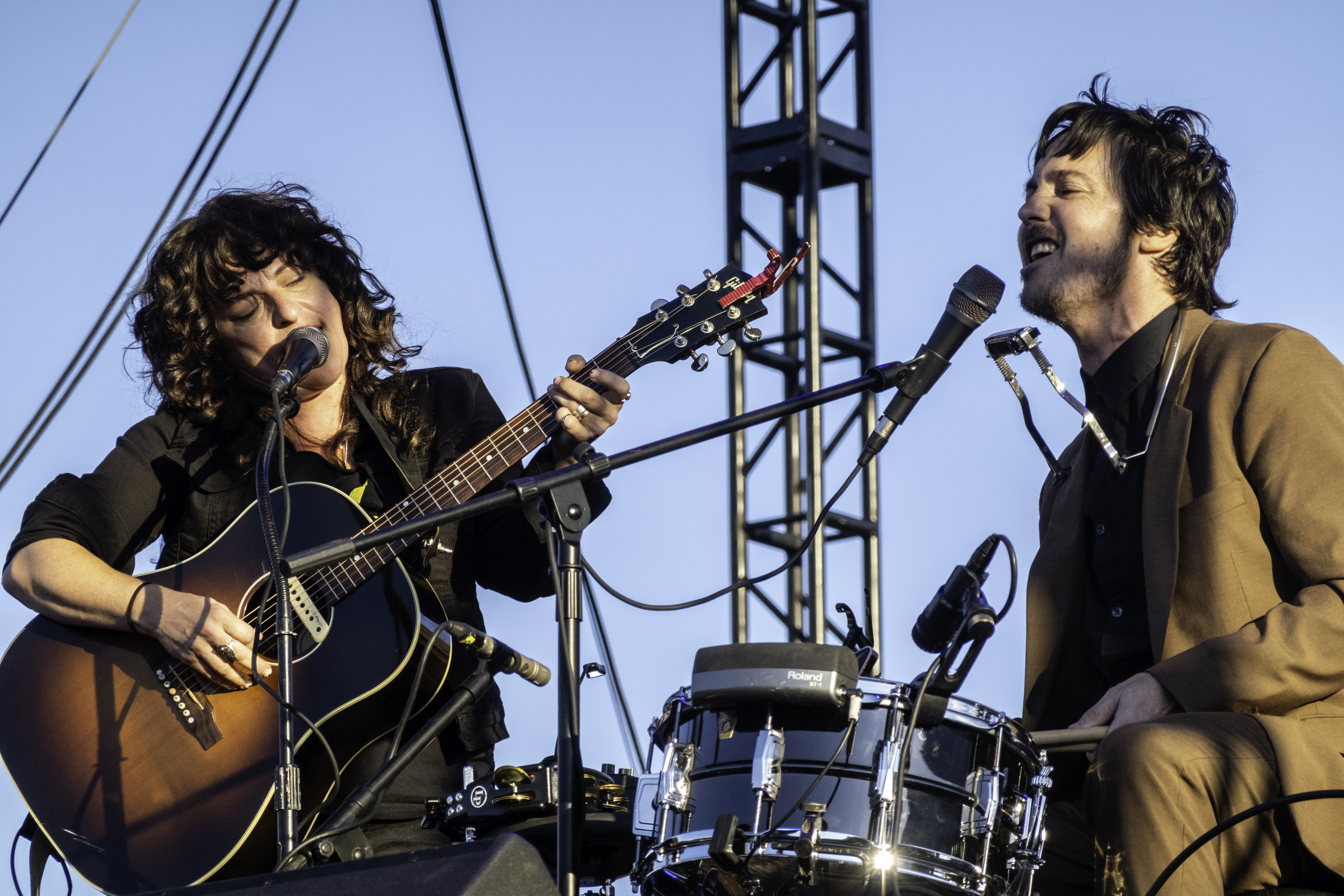
- Shovels & Rope playing at Grand Rapids Riverfest on Sept 10, 2022

Background information
- Origin: Charleston, South Carolina United States
- Genres: Americana, folk, alternative country
- Years active: 2008–present
- Labels: Dualtone, Dine Alone
- Members: Michael Trent; Cary Ann Hearst
- Website: shovelsandrope.com

Shovels & Rope are an American folk duo from Charleston, South Carolina, composed of husband and wife Michael Trent and Cary Ann Hearst. Combining threads from their individual solo careers, Shovels & Rope blends traditional folk, rock and roll and country rock.

The band's seventh album Something Is Working Up Above My Head was released September 6, 2024, on Dualtone Records.

== History ==
=== Beginnings ===
Cary Ann Hearst was born in Mississippi in 1979 and raised in Nashville from 1987 until she attended the College of Charleston in 1997. During school she began performing music as a solo artist in local bars and venues. After graduating she toured, recorded and performed with various groups including Caravan and Borrowed Angels. Michael Trent was born in Houston, grew up in Denver, and eventually relocated to Charleston. Hearst saw Trent performing with his band The Films in 2002 and they began touring with various artists including Jump, Little Children. Hearst released her first solo album Dust and Bones in 2006 and Trent released his self-titled solo album, also his first, in 2007.

In 2008, Hearst and Trent recorded and released the album Shovels & Rope as a co-bill under their individual names, not intended to ever create a permanent act. Hearst and Trent married in March 2009 and continued to perform and record their music for their individual solo careers. Hearst released the EP Are You Ready to Die in 2010 and the LP Lions and Lambs in 2011. Trent released The Winner in 2010.

At the end of 2010, filming began on a documentary titled The Ballad of Shovels and Rope about their life as a band. Originally slated for only 3 months of filming, it did not end until September 2013. After filming finished, a Kickstarter campaign was launched to help get the film finished and released. The film premiered at the 2014 Cleveland International Film Festival. The documentary went on to win Ground Zero Tennessee Spirit Award for best feature at the Nashville Film Festival and Best Feature Documentary at the Port Townsend Film Festival.

=== With Dualtone ===
In 2012, the pair committed to their joint venture and released an album together under the Shovels & Rope moniker entitled O' Be Joyful under the Dualtone Records label, which reached #123 on the Billboard 200.

The band made their network television debut playing "Birmingham" on Late Show with David Letterman, January 30, 2013. On September 18, 2013 at the Americana Music Honors & Awards Shovels & Rope received the honors of emerging artist of the year, as well as song of the year for their song "Birmingham". They also appear in an end scene, and provide the episode background music, for the Charleston episode of CNN's Anthony Bourdain: Parts Unknown.

Their third album, titled Swimmin' Time, was released on August 26, 2014 on Dualtone Records and debuted at #20 on the Billboard 200. On November 20, 2015, Shovels & Rope released a cover album titled Busted Jukebox Vol. 1, featuring ten cover songs with help from nine other bands including The Milk Carton Kids, Shakey Graves, and Lucius.

=== With New West Records ===
On October 7, 2016 Shovels & Rope released their fourth studio album Little Seeds on the New West Records label. On December 8, 2017 the band released a second cover album titled Busted Jukebox Vol. 2 which features ten cover songs with help from nine other bands including Brandi Carlile, Rhett Miller, and John Moreland.

On August 10, 2018 the band released a compilation vinyl titled Predecessors including Michael Trent's 2010 album The Winner, Cary Ann Hearst's 2011 album Lions and Lambs and a disc of covers and previously unreleased demos.

=== With Dualtone again ===
On January 15, 2019 the duo announced an April 12 release of their new album, By Blood, again via Dualtone Records and released a new track, "The Wire". The album was recorded in their at-home studio and was released on April 12, 2019 to generally favorable reviews. On March 4, 2019 it was announced that the band's first concert film titled Shovels & Rope: The Movie would debut on March 15, 2019 at the Charleston Film Festival.

On January 27, 2021 the band announced the third entry into their 'Busted Jukebox' series, nicknamed Busted Juicebox, Volume 3 as the album would contain only children's songs. The album released on February 5, 2021 and contains ten cover songs, co-performed with other musicians including Sharon Van Etten, The Secret Sisters, and M. Ward.

At shows on their 2021 'Bare Bones' tour which would feature songs from their upcoming album Manticore which released on February 18, 2022. The album was announced on October 19, 2021 along with the debut of the lead single "Domino".

== High Water Festival ==
In 2017, Shovels & Rope founded a music festival that occurs annually in Charleston, South Carolina.

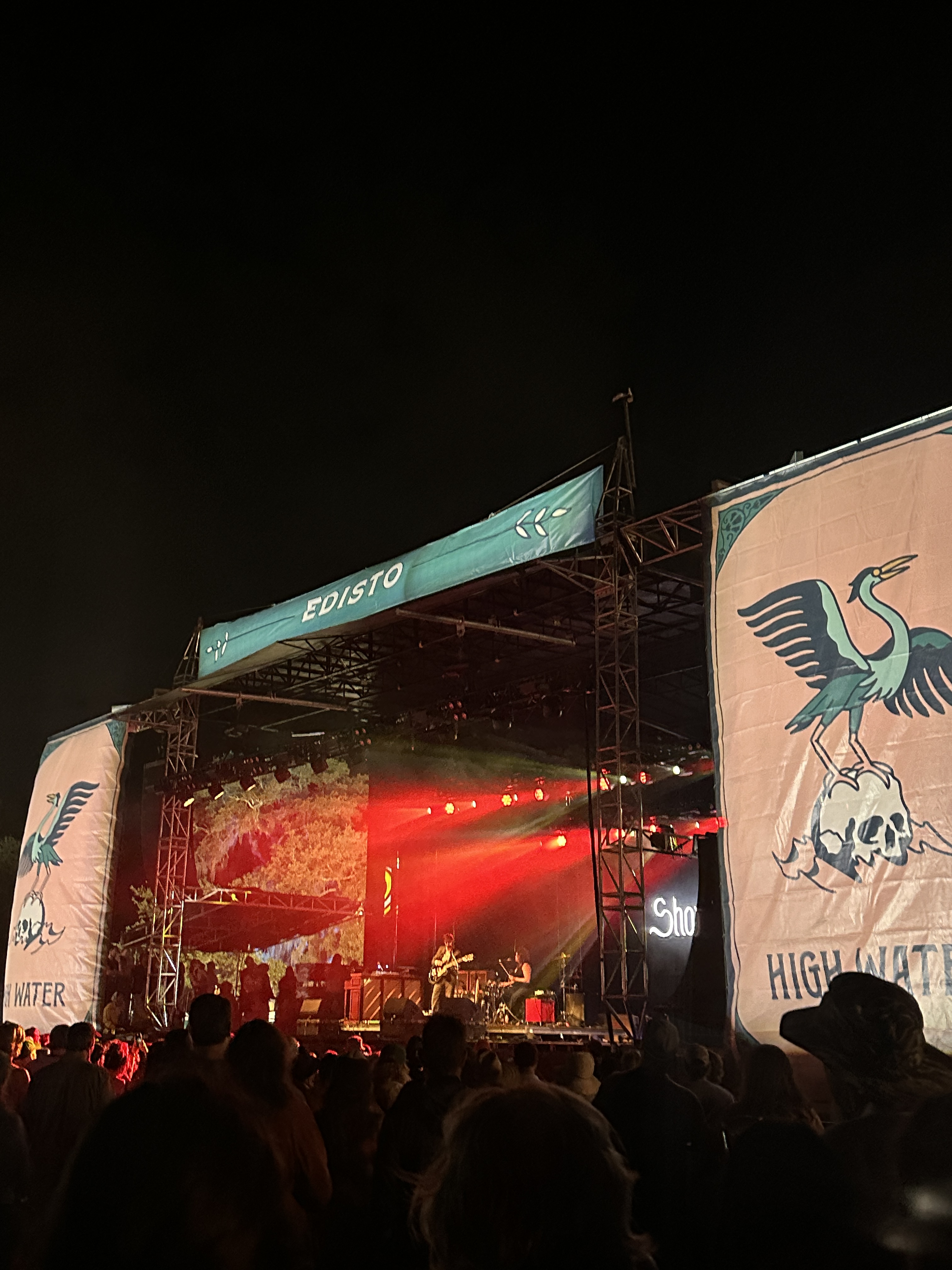
Shovels & Rope performing at High Water Festival 2023

== Performance and songwriting style ==
As Shovels & Rope tour they typically perform a mix of songs from their solo careers and the combined ventures. Some of the songs authored by Shovels & Rope chronicle historical events. "Thresher" from their 2014 album Swimmin' Time references the April 10, 1963 sinking of the USS Thresher (SSN-593). "Missionary Ridge" from their 2016 album Little Seeds references the November 25, 1863 Battle of Missionary Ridge in Chattanooga, Tennessee.

== Members ==
- Cary Ann Hearst - lead and backing vocals, guitar, drums, keyboard, percussion
- Michael Trent - lead and backing vocals, harmonica, guitar, drums, keyboard, percussion

== Discography ==
=== Albums ===
Title	Album details	Peak chart positions				
Title	Album details	US	US Heat	US Indie	US Folk	US Rock
Shovels & Rope	Release date: December 2, 2008; Label: Our House	-	-	-	-	-
O' Be Joyful	Release date: July 31, 2012; Label: Dualtone	123	1	22	7	42
Swimmin' Time	Release date: August 26, 2014; Label: Dualtone	21	-	6	1	5
Busted Jukebox Vol. 1	Release date: November 20, 2015; Label: Dualtone	-	-	27	11	42
Little Seeds	Release date: October 7, 2016; Label: New West	83	-	15	4	19
Busted Jukebox Vol. 2	Release date: December 8, 2017; Label: New West	-	-	-	-	-
By Blood	Release date: April 12, 2019; Label: Dualtone	167	-	-	-	-
Busted Jukebox Vol. 3	Release date: February 5, 2021; Label: Dualtone	-	-	-	-	-
Manticore	Release date: February 18, 2022; Label: Dualtone	-	-	-	-	-
Something Is Working Up Above My Head	September 6, 2024; Label: Dualtone	-	-	-	-	-

=== Singles ===
- "The Devil is All Around" (2014)
- "I Know" (2016)
- "St. Anne's Parade" (2016)
- "Botched Execution" (2016)
- "Great, America (2017)" (2018)
- "The Wire" (2019)
- "Domino" (2021)

=== Music videos ===
Year	Video
2013	"Birmingham"

== Awards and nominations ==
Year	Association	Category	Nominated work	Result
2013	Americana Music Association	Emerging Artist of the Year	Shovels & Rope	Won
2013	Americana Music Association	Duo/Group of the Year	Shovels & Rope	Nominated
2013	Americana Music Association	Song of the Year	"Birmingham"	Won
2015	Americana Music Association	Duo/Group of the Year	Shovels & Rope	Nominated
