= Aaron Lee Tasjan =

American musician and producer (born 1986)

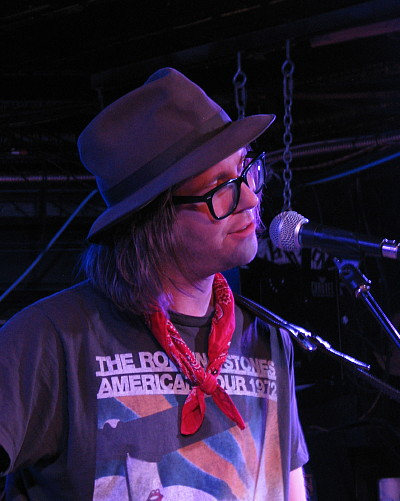
- Lee Tasjan performing at The Saint in 2014

Background information
- Born: August 24, 1986 (age 40)
- Origin: New Albany, Ohio
- Genres: Folk rock; rock
- Instruments: Vocals, guitar
- Years active: 2004–present
- Labels: First of 3; New West
- Formerly of: Semi Precious Weapons
- Website: aaronleetasjan.com

Aaron Lee Tasjan (born August 24, 1986) is an American singer-songwriter, guitarist, and record producer.

Tasjan is reported to have his own distinct version of "indie folk grit." Garret Woodward of the Smoky Mountain News says, "Tasjan's words are soaked in spilled whiskey, misunderstood tears and dusty memories. Each number seeps into the cracks of your troubled soul." Tasjan earned a 2022 Grammy Award Best American Roots Song nomination for the song "Diamond Studded Shoes".

== Biography ==
Tasjan was born in Wilmington, Delaware. His family moved to San Juan Capistrano, California, when he was ten years old, then later moved to New Albany, Ohio, about 25 minutes northeast of Columbus. Both of Tasjan's parents are musicians, but neither played professionally. Tasjan taught himself to play guitar at age 11 by learning Oasis songs.

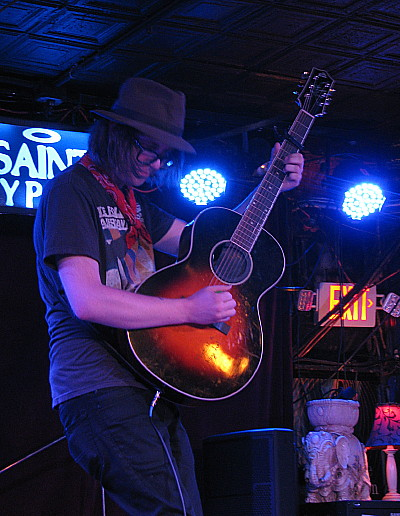
Aaron Lee Tasjan performing at The Saint in Asbury Park, NJ on July 8, 2014

By age 16 Tasjan had performed with Peter Yarrow and been the recipient of the Outstanding Guitarist Award in the Essentially Ellington Competition at Jazz at Lincoln Center, New York City. He was offered a full scholarship to the Berklee College of Music following his graduation from New Albany High School, but decided instead to move to Brooklyn, New York in 2006.

In New York, Tasjan met Justin Tranter, Cole Whittle, and Dan Crean and formed the band Semi Precious Weapons. Tasjan's work with SPW caught the eye of Drivin' N' Cryin's Kevn Kinney, who later invited Tasjan to tour with him as an opening act and guitar player. He also mentored Tasjan, advising him that a musician never has to be defined by one sound or genre. This principle has helped shape Tasjan's work. Tony Visconti produced SPW's debut album, We Love You, and they signed with Razor & Tie Records. Shortly thereafter, Tasjan left SPW and formed his own band, The Madison Square Gardeners, which was described by The Village Voice as, "The best NYC has to offer." Tasjan remained with them for three years, during which time they recorded one full-length album and 3 EPs.

In 2013 Tasjan moved to Nashville, TN to focus on songwriting and a solo career. He has since released 2 EPs, "Crooked River Burning" and "Telling Stories to the Wall".

Tasjan's debut full-length effort, In the Blazes, was released on October 6, 2015, and his follow-up, Silver Tears, was released October 28, 2016.

Tasjan earned a 2022 Grammy Award Best American Roots Song nomination for the song "Diamond Studded Shoes".

== Collaborations ==
Tasjan linked up with rock poet—and former Semi Precious Weapons manager—BP Fallon to write the song I Believe in Elvis Presley, produced by Jack White, and released on the Third Man Records label. The pair also collaborated with Sean Lennon and Irina Lazareanu in their art-rock band, Operation Juliet. In 2013 Fallon and Tasjan formed another project, BP Fallon & The Bandits, which included Clem Burke, Ian McLagan, and Nigel Harrison. Texas Country superstar Pat Green recorded Tasjan's "Streets of Galilee," for the album Songs We Wish We'd Written 2, and was so impressed by the songwriter that he asked Tasjan to record the song with him. The record later reached number 15 on the US Country Billboard Charts.

Highway Prayer: A Tribute to Adam Carroll, released in late fall 2016 on Austin-based Eight 30 Records, features Tasjan and fellow East Nashvillian Tim Easton collaborating on Carroll's "Black Flag Blues."

Tasjan also released a 7” with Lilly Hiatt on Jack White's Third Man Records. Tasjan and Hiatt later collaborated on Tom Petty's Walls, released the week of Petty's passing.

== Discography ==
- Hard Love and Free Luck (2008)
- August Moon EP (2011)
- The Thinking Man's Filth EP (2012)
- Crooked River Burning EP (2014)
- Telling Stories to the Wall EP (2015)
- In the Blazes (2015)
- Silver Tears (2016)
- Karma for Cheap (2018)
- Karma for Cheap: Reincarnated (2019)
- Tasjan! Tasjan! Tasjan! (2021)
- Stellar Evolution (2024)
- Get Over It, Underdog (2026)

== Singles ==
- Luck Mansion Sessions (2017)
