= Smoky Mountain News =

- Type: Weekly newspaper
- Format: Tabloid
- Editor: Scott McLeod
- News editor: Jessi Stone
- Language: English
- Headquarters: Waynesville, North Carolina
- Circulation: 16,000
- Website: smokymountainnews.com

Smoky Mountain News is a free weekly newspaper based in Waynesville, North Carolina that is distributed in Haywood, Jackson, Macon and Swain counties, North Carolina.
