= Cary Ann Hearst =

American musician (born 1979)

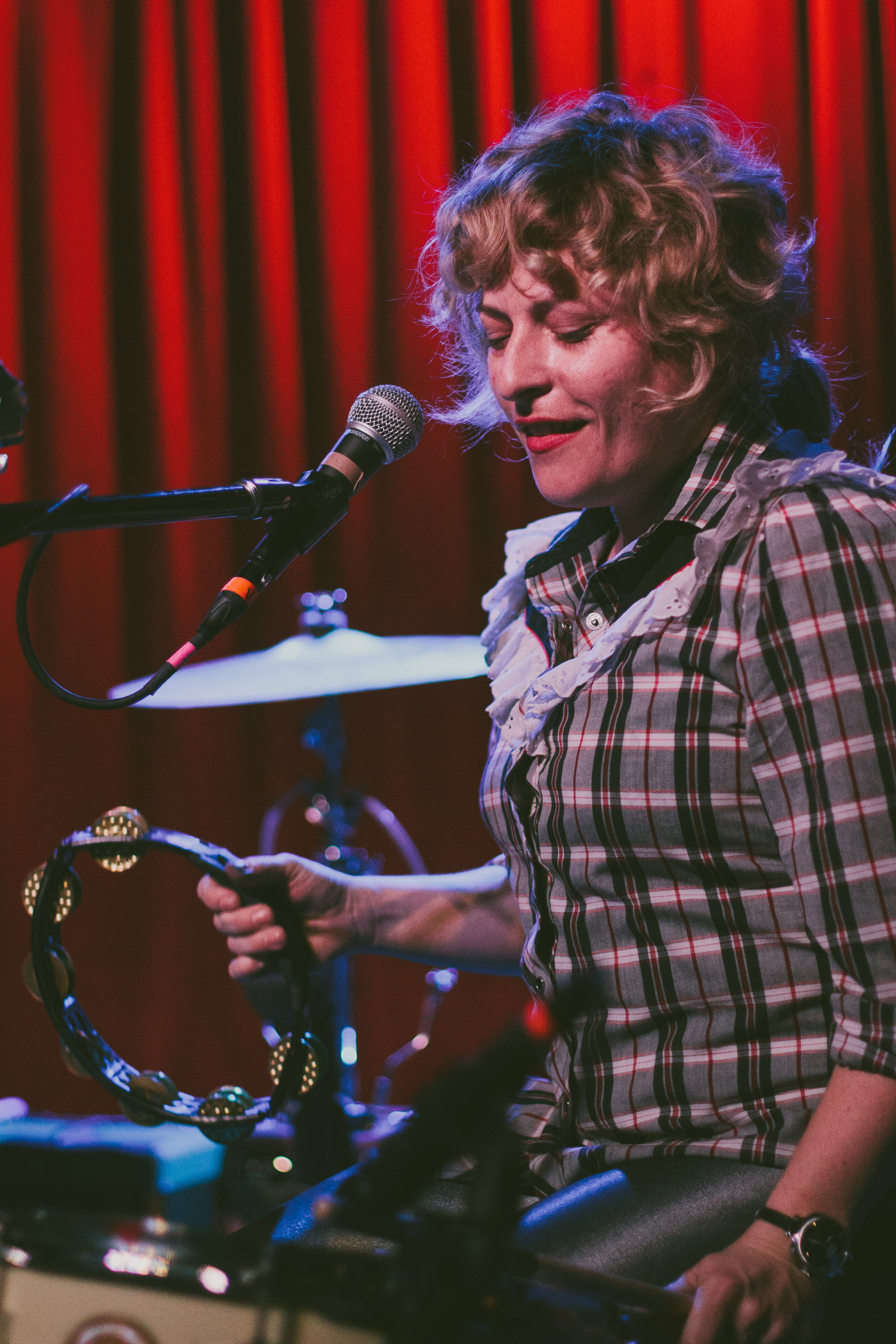
- Cary Ann Hearst Trent

Background information
- Born: August 10, 1979 (age 47)
- Genres: Folk, country rock
- Occupations: Singer-songwriter, musician
- Instruments: Vocals, guitar, drums
- Years active: 2007–present
- Label: Dualtone Records
- Website: shovelsandrope.com

Cary Ann Hearst (born August 10, 1979) is a folk/roots rock musical artist from South Carolina, US. She performs as a solo act, as well as with her husband, Michael Trent, in the band Shovels & Rope. Hearst's influences are rooted in the soulful, gritty sounds of Townes Van Zandt, Bob Dylan, and Loretta Lynn, among others.

== Career ==
Hearst got her first taste of fame when her song "Hell's Bells" was featured in the HBO vampire drama True Blood. She has eight albums, the first two (Dust and Bones, Lions and Lambs) as solo projects, and the most recent six (Shovels & Rope, O' Be Joyful, Swimming Time, Little Seeds, By Blood, and Manticore) as a collaboration with her husband, Michael Trent, under the moniker Shovels & Rope.

== Personal life ==
Hearst is a Nashville, Tennessee, native and graduated from MLK Magnet High School. Her mother and father both hail from the Mississippi Delta. She is married to Michael Trent.
