= Troy Carter (talent manager) =

American music manager

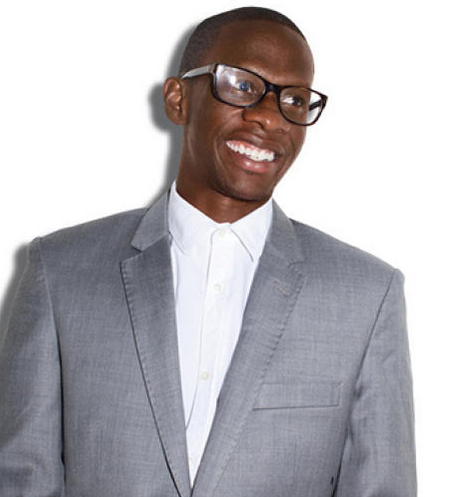
- Carter in 2014
- Born: Troy Lemar Carter; November 14, 1972 (age 53); Philadelphia, Pennsylvania, U.S.
- Occupations: Talent manager; entrepreneur
- Years active: 1995–present
- Title: Founder, CEO of Q&A
- Children: 5

Troy Lemar Carter, Sr. (born November 14, 1972) is an American talent manager and record executive from Philadelphia, Pennsylvania. He co-founded the music and technology company, Q&A Media in 2019, and is its CEO. Prior, he was chairman and CEO of Atom Factory, a talent management and media production company, and Global Head of Creator Services at Spotify.

== Life and career ==
=== 1972–1998: Early life and career beginnings ===
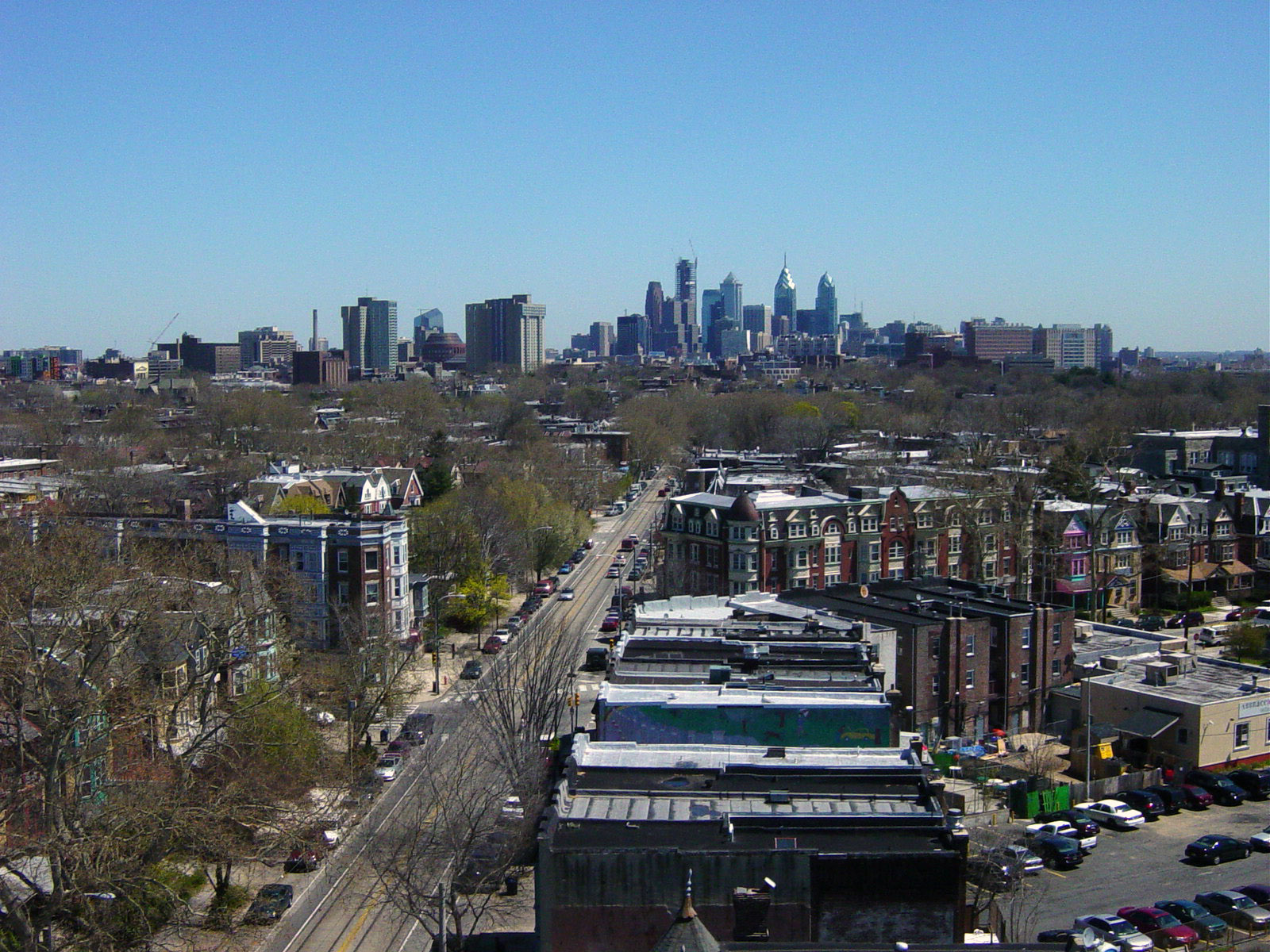
Carter grew up in West Philadelphia.

Troy Carter was born on November 14, 1972, and was raised in West Philadelphia, attending Huey Elementary and Sayre Middle School. At the age of two, Carter's parents divorced. At the age of seven, his father, who had remarried, shot and killed his new wife's brother after an argument and was sentenced to 12 years in prison. Despite this, his father and step-mother stayed together, and after prison his father rebuilt his life, with Carter calling him "one of my real heroes."

In 1990, at the age of 17, Carter dropped out of West Philadelphia High School in pursuit of a career in the music industry with his high school hip hop group 2 Too Many, and was signed by Will Smith and James Lassiter to their label WilJam Records. After the group lost their contract the following year, they disbanded and Carter then went on to work both for DJ Jazzy Jeff in the studio and for Lassiter as a personal assistant. At age 22, Carter tried to start an artistic collaboration with the Will Smith's recording studio based in Philadelphia. The year later, he was promoting rap concerts around Philadelphia for artists such as The Notorious B.I.G. It was through this that he met record producer Sean Combs, who hired Carter as an intern for Bad Boy Records in New York City for a year and a half.

After Carter's internship at Bad Boy had ended, he moved to Los Angeles in pursuit of further work with Lassiter, only to be fired and sent back to Philadelphia. According to Lassiter, his decision was largely influenced by his beliefs that Carter had started to exhibit an entitled attitude, saying, "I would constantly talk to him about it, about work ethic and starting at the bottom and working his way up. When he rejected it, I told him to go back to West Philly. He had to go back and experience this for himself, and come out on the other side." For the next several years, Carter struggled trying to find success in Philadelphia, citing it as one of his "darkest times".

=== Since 1999: Career ===
In 1999, after several years of working in Philadelphia, Carter met then-emerging rap artist Eve in Germantown, and she asked him to be her manager. In addition, Carter began managing other rap acts such as Nelly and Floetry. That same year, Carter teamed up with Jay Erving, son of retired basketball player Julius Erving, and co-founded the talent management company Erving Wonder.

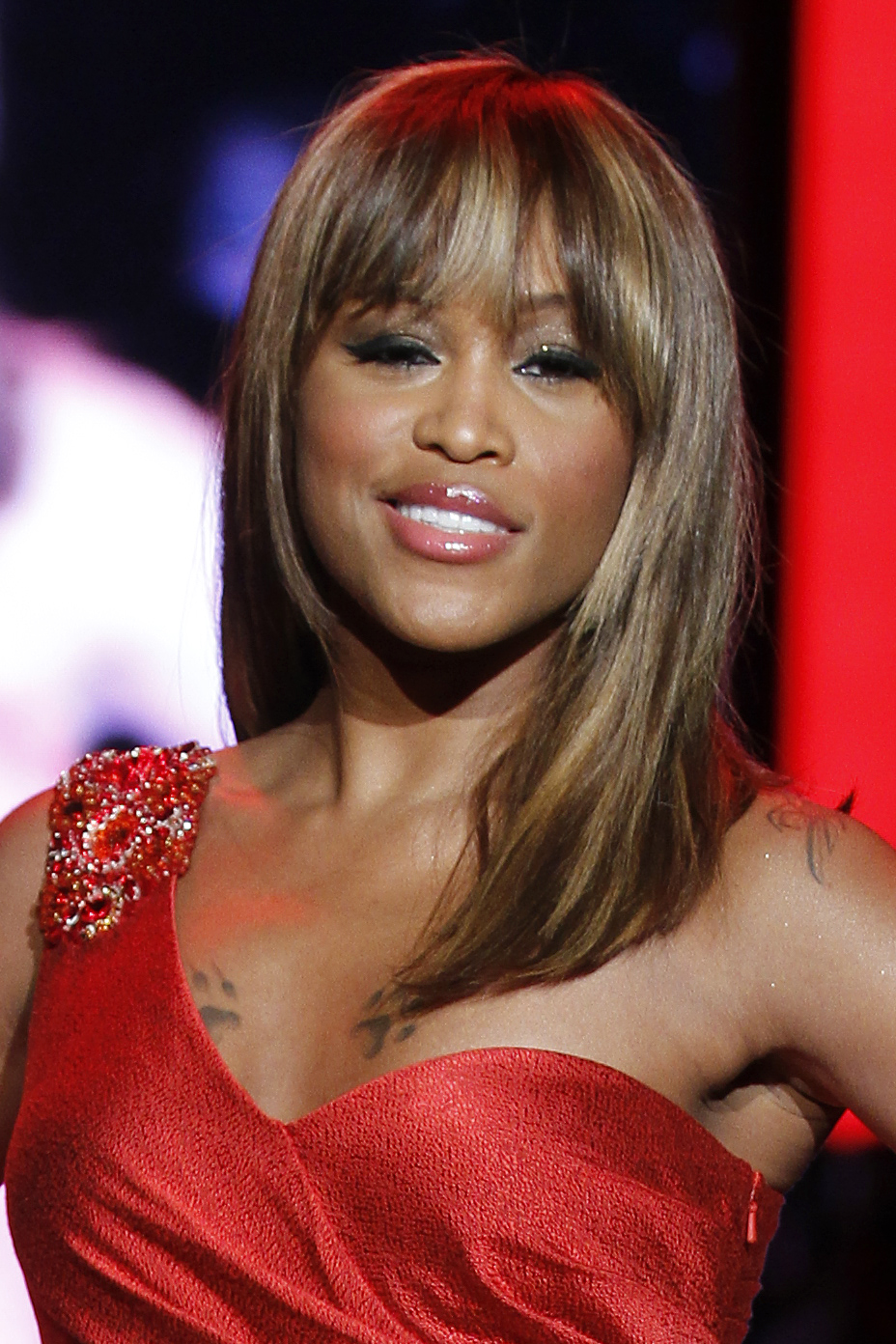
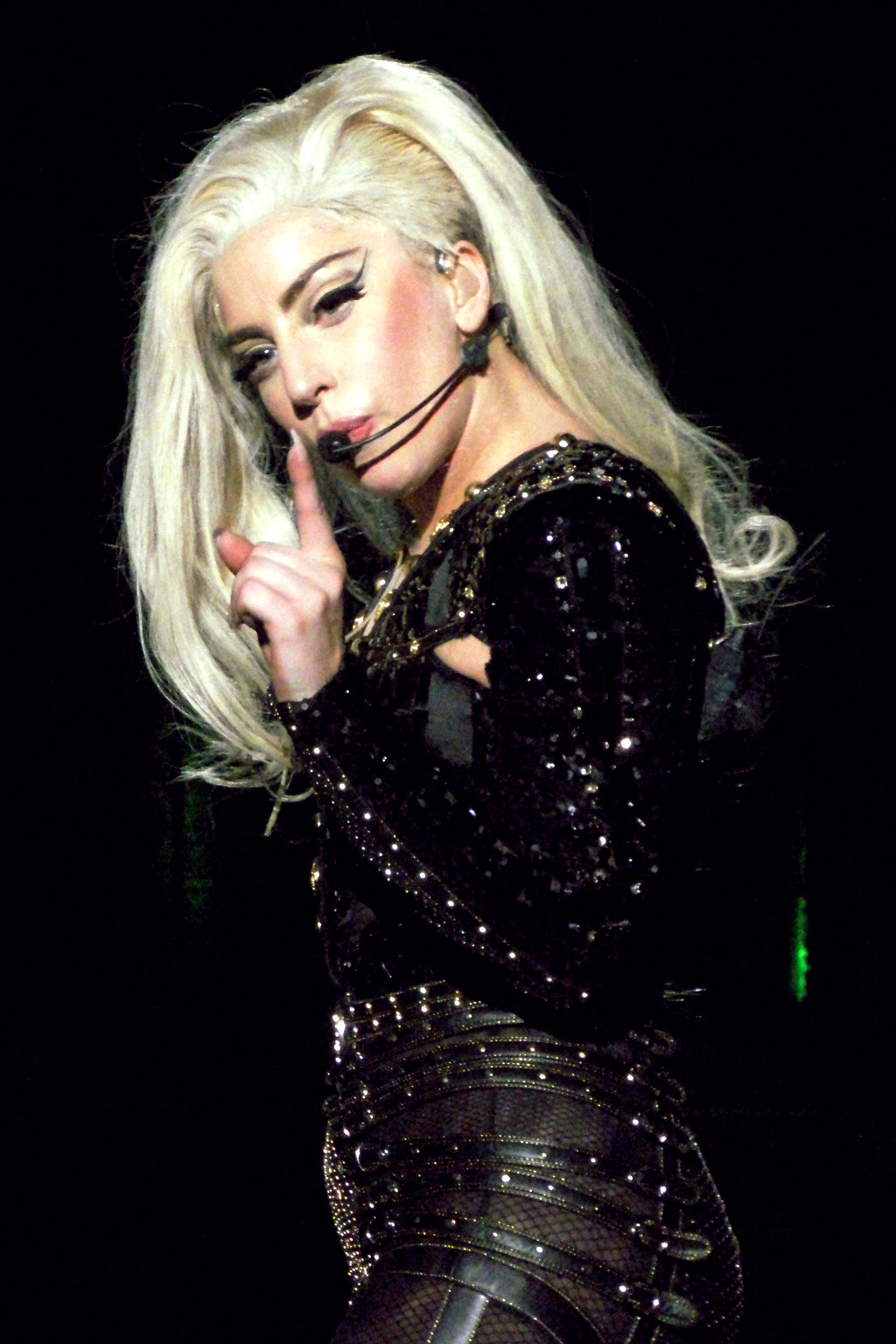
Carter has managed American recording artists Eve (left) and Lady Gaga (right)

In 2003, Carter moved back to Los Angeles and helped Eve get her own show on UPN. The following year, Carter and Erving sold Erving Wonder to British-based firm Sanctuary, with Carter as the company's executive vice president. Over the next two years, Erving Wonder's deal with Sanctuary fell apart, Eve fired him, and by 2006, Carter not only lost all the money from the Sanctuary deal, but he was severely in debt. His home mortgage was foreclosed and his car was repossessed. As Carter was facing eviction from his home, record producer Vincent Herbert, who had just left Universal Records, introduced Carter to a new client, then-unknown Lady Gaga, who had just been dropped from Def Jam Records. For the next year, Carter, Herbert, and Gaga went around California, performing at multiple clubs each night with both little money and little support. It was also in 2007 that Carter founded Coalition Media Group, and its management division Atom Factory in 2010.

In 2011, he co-founded The Backplane, a Silicon Valley–based startup that attempts to "redefine social media" by allowing celebrities and brands to "connect with fans, foster community, and cultivate brand loyalty". It was also in 2011 that Carter received an Emmy Award nomination for Outstanding Variety, Music or Comedy Special for his work on the HBO special Lady Gaga Presents the Monster Ball Tour: At Madison Square Garden, sharing the nomination with Lady Gaga, Vincent Herbert, Jimmy Iovine, and Mo Morrison.

Since signing Lady Gaga in 2007, Carter has gone on to manage numerous other artists such as John Legend, Greyson Chance, Mindless Behavior, Priyanka Chopra, Lindsey Stirling, Meghan Trainor, The Ceremonies and Pia Mia. Lady Gaga fired him in 2014.

He is a member of the 2012 class of Henry Crown Fellows at The Aspen Institute. He is on the board of advisors of 'opinion-network' start-up State.com. Carter appeared as a guest Shark during the seventh season of reality TV show Shark Tank, which aired on October 9, 2015. Carter was named to Oprah Winfrey's SuperSoul 100 list of visionaries and influential leaders in 2016.

In July 2018, it was announced that Carter would exit Spotify in early September and assumed an advisory role. In 2019, Ithaca Holdings alleged Carter failed to repay a loan, in a lawsuit that settled out of court.

== Personal life ==
Carter and his wife Rebecca have five children. In 2012, the two reportedly raised millions of dollars for Barack Obama's presidential campaign.
