= Semi Precious Weapons =

American rock band (2006–2014)

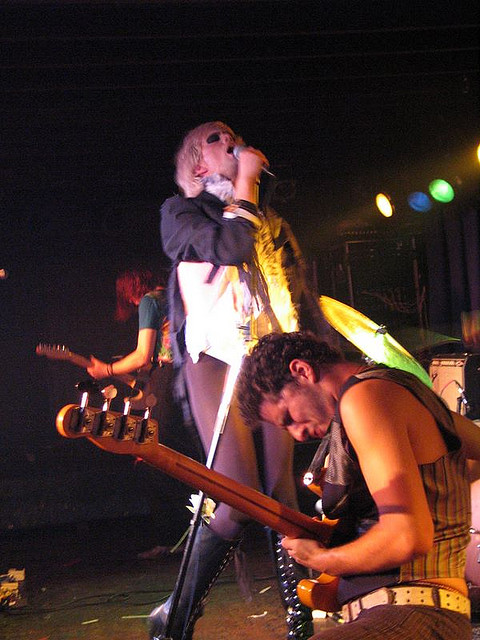
- Semi Precious Weapons performing in 2007

Background information
- Also known as: SPW
- Origin: New York City, New York, U.S.
- Genres: Glam rock, alternative rock, garage rock
- Years active: 2006–2014
- Labels: Razor & Tie, Interscope/Geffen, Cherrytree, Epic, RedZone
- Spinoffs: DNCE
- Past members: Justin Tranter; Cole Whittle; Dan Crean; Stevy Pyne; Aaron Lee Tasjan; Joe McCant

Semi Precious Weapons were an American rock band from New York City, New York, United States, consisting of Justin Tranter on vocals, Stevy Pyne on guitar, Cole Whittle (later of DNCE) on bass and Dan Crean on drums. Pyne replaced former guitarist, Aaron Lee Tasjan, in November 2008.

== Career ==
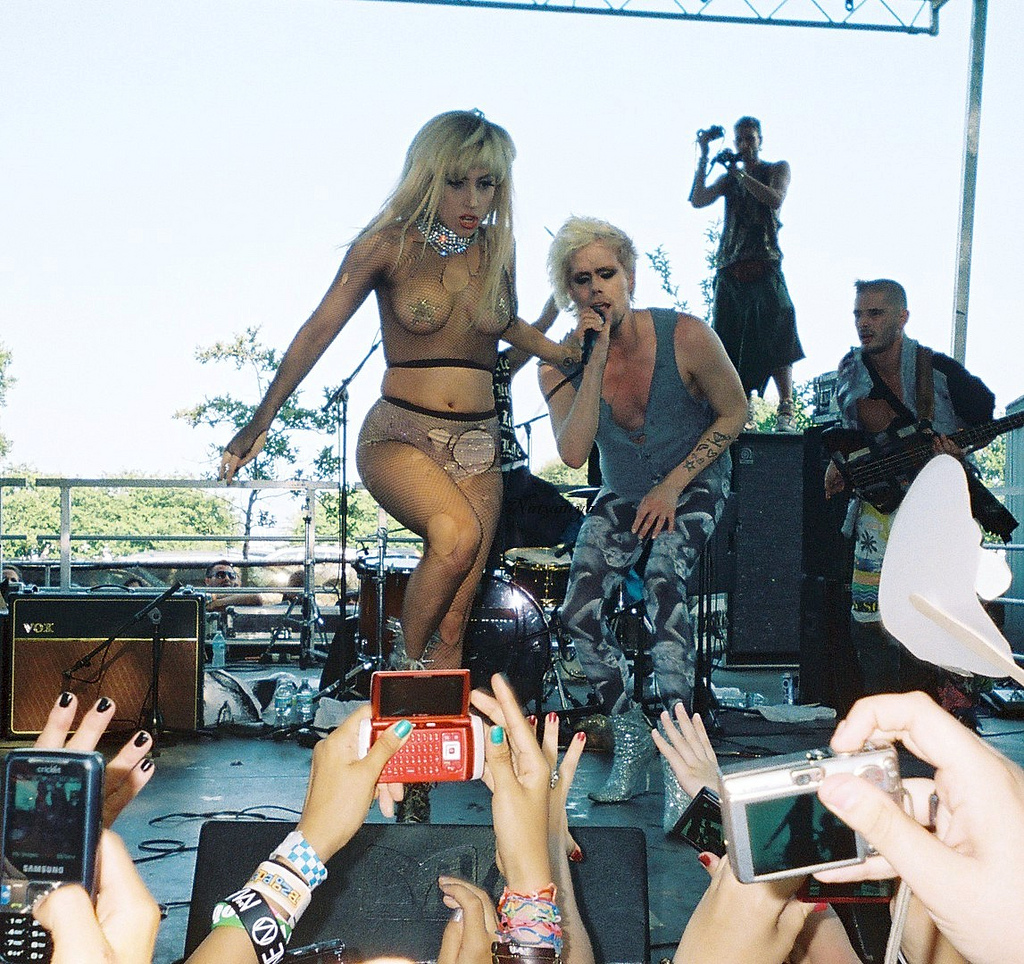
Performing "Magnetic Baby" with Lady Gaga at Lollapalooza, 2010

In 2006, Semi Precious Weapons (SPW) was formed by Berklee College of Music graduates Tranter, Whittle, Crean and Tasjan. In 2007 Rovena Cardiel, a friend of erstwhile manager BP Fallon brought in Tony Visconti to executive - produce their first album, We Love You. Grammy-winner Mario J. McNulty produced, recorded and mixed the album. Funded by Tranter's jewelry sales, that were sold in retailers under the name 'Precious Weapons,' they originally released the album as a free download.

In March 2008, the band signed a worldwide recording agreement with Razor & Tie. The band's album We Love You was re-released under this label on September 30, 2008. Semi Precious Weapons signed to Interscope Records in November 2009. Since November 27, they have been the special guests for Lady Gaga's The Monster Ball. At the same time they began recording a new album titled You Love You, which released on June 29, 2010.

In January 2008, they caused a stir in the United Kingdom after Kate Moss attended their concert at London's Death Disco club and danced with 'six foot bisexual' singer Justin Tranter. Vogue described the band as "unashamedly crass and deliciously animated". On March 18, 2010, the band's eponymous song "Semi Precious Weapons" achieved their first number one - on New Zealand radio station The Edge.

Their track "Magnetic Baby" is featured as a downloadable track in Rock Band 2. The band had a cameo in the video for Lady Gaga's "Telephone" and served as her opening act on her 2009–2011 tour The Monster Ball Tour.

The band's self-titled song appears on the soundtrack for, and is included in the live action feature film, Bad Kids Go to Hell (2012), based on the best selling graphic novel of the same name.

On December 26, 2012, Tranter tweeted on the band Twitter page saying that they are going to announce the release date to their song "Aviation High" from their new album. "Not January 1st, but soon!" "Aviation High" was played live by the band back in June 2012 during the Keep Austin Weird festival. "Aviation High" was released on the band's personal SoundCloud page on February 18. The music video for the song followed by being released on March 4, 2013, on the band's YouTube page.

The album, Aviation, was released in April 2014.

== Discography ==
=== Studio albums ===
Title	Details	Peak positions
Title	Details	US Heat
We Love You	Release date: September 30, 2008; Label: Razor & Tie; Formats: CD, music download	—
You Love You	Release date: June 29, 2010; Label: Interscope/Geffen Records; Formats: CD, music download	10
Aviation	Release date: April 22, 2014; Label: RedZone Records; Formats: CD, music download	8
"—" denotes releases that did not chart

=== Singles ===
Year	Single	Album
2010	"Semi Precious Weapons"	You Love You
2010	"Magnetic Baby"	You Love You
2010	"Look at Me"	You Love You
2014	"Aviation High" (#39 Billboard Alternative Songs)	Aviation
2014	"Look to the Stars"	Aviation

== Tours ==
Opening act

- The Monster Ball Tour (2009–2011)
- Warrior Tour (2013)

Headlining act

- Dirty Showbiz Tour (2010)
