= The Films =

American indie pop rock band

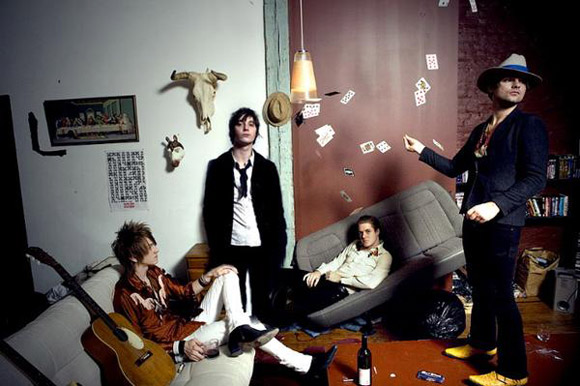
- The Films

Background information
- Origin: Charleston, South Carolina, United States
- Years active: 2003–2010
- Labels: Independent
- Past members: Michael Trent; Kenneth Aaron Harris; Jake Sinclair; Adam Blake

The Films were an American indie pop rock band from Charleston, South Carolina, and consisted of Michael Trent, Kenneth Harris, Jake Sinclair, and Adam Blake. The band members met in high school and in 2006 recorded/produced the EP Being Bored. That same year, the band released their debut album Don't Dance Rattlesnake which earned them a substantial fan following in Germany and Japan. Their next album Oh, Scorpio was released on Warner in 2009. They toured Germany as part of the Jägermeister Rock Liga tour in 2009. After another European tour in 2010, the band broke up, because of what Trent later explained as a result of running out of momentum, money and "hope for the project".

== Discography ==
- 2007 Being Bored (EP)
- 2007 Don't Dance Rattlesnake
- 2009 Oh, Scorpio
