= The Ceremonies (EP) =

The Ceremonies EP

EP by The Ceremonies
- Released: October 8, 2013
- Recorded: 2012–13
- Genre: Indie rock, new wave, alternative rock, post-punk, art rock, psychedelic pop
- Length: 23:23
- Label: Atom Factory Music, Capitol Records
- Producer: Matthew R. Cook and Danny Garibay

The Ceremonies is an EP by American indie rock band The Ceremonies. It was released on October 8, 2013, in the United States.

== Background ==
The EP includes five songs, "Wolfdance", "Land Of Gathering", "Straw Hat", "Ballroom Bones" and "Nightlight". Which will be featured on their upcoming debut studio album.

== Track listing ==
No.	Title	Length
1.	"Wolfdance"	3:53
2.	"Land Of Gathering"	5:13
3.	"Straw Hat"	5:04
4.	"Ballroom Bones"	5:15
5.	"Nightlight"	4:01

== Release history ==
Region	Date	Format	Label
United States	8 October 2013	Digital download	Atom Factory Music, Capitol Records
