= Walking Proof =

Studio album by Lilly Hiatt
- Released: March 27, 2020
- Length: 36:23
- Label: New West

Lilly Hiatt chronology
Trinity Lane (2017)	Walking Proof (2020)

Professional ratings
Aggregate scores
Source	Rating
Metacritic	85/100
Review scores
Source	Rating
AllMusic	4/5 stars
Paste	8/10
Pitchfork	7.6/10
Slant Magazine	4.5/5 stars

Walking Proof is the fourth studio album by American singer-songwriter Lilly Hiatt. It was released on March 27, 2020, under New West Records.

== Critical reception ==
Walking Proof was met with universal acclaim reviews from critics. At Metacritic, which assigns a weighted average rating out of 100 to reviews from mainstream publications, this release received an average score of 85, based on 7 reviews.

=== Accolades ===
Accolades for Walking Proof
Publication	Accolade	Rank	Ref.
Paste	Paste's 25 Best Albums of 2020 – Mid-Year	16	

== Track listing ==
Walking Proof track listing
No.	Title	Length
1.	"Rae"	2:55
2.	"P-Town"	2:46
3.	"Little Believer"	2:56
4.	"Some Kind of Drug"	4:06
5.	"Candy Lunch"	3:23
6.	"Walking Proof"	3:55
7.	"Drawl"	3:55
8.	"Brightest Star"	3:07
9.	"Never Play Guitar"	3:20
10.	"Move"	2:35
11.	"Scream"	4:23

== Charts ==
Chart performance for Walking Proof
Chart (2020)	Peak position
US Top Album Sales (Billboard)	86
US Indie Store Album Sales (Billboard)	13
