= The Grahams =

Alternative pop duo

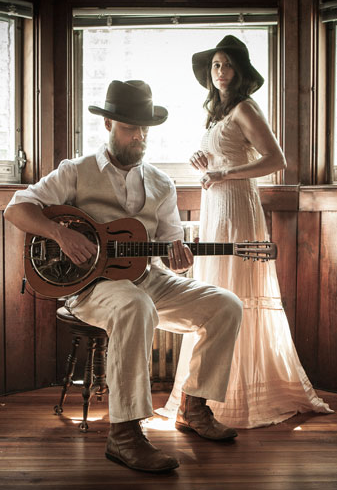
The Grahams

The Grahams are an alternative pop duo of couple Alyssa and Doug Graham. They released their debut album, Riverman's Daughter, in 2013. It was produced by Malcolm Burn. Their third studio album Kids Like Us, produced by Richard Swift, was released in 2020. The duo returned in 2021 with a 3-track EP Sha La La, produced by Dan Molad. They later released the self-titled cover album The Grahams, also produced by Molad.

== History ==
In late 2012, The Grahams was created by Alyssa and Doug Graham. Their first album, Riverman's Daughter, was written based on a road trip they took through the United States. “Throughout their tours and travels, Alyssa and Doug Graham wrote the 12 songs that comprise the work as they made their way along the Great River Road that parallels the Mississippi. They stopped in various juke joints, exchanging stories and playing music with the locals. At the end of their journey, they holed up in a houseboat in rural Louisiana where the Mississippi spills into the Atchafalaya swamp, and periodically invited friends and musicians onboard to help them hone the material.” Including lifelong friend and writing partner, Bryan McCann.

Riverman's Daughter was recorded in RCA studios, (then owned by Ben Folds) with Malcom Burn at the helm. The album was complemented with imagery by photographer David Johnson Riverman's Daughter was released digitally worldwide, on CD, and on Vinyl in the US and Canada on September 3, 2013.

The marketing campaign, coordinated by CEN, included PR, radio promotion, video promotion, touring, sales initiatives, licensing outreach and more.

At radio the album debuted on the Americana radio charts four different times from late 2013 to early 2014, a feat that promotion man Al Moss had never seen in his long career. It spent a total of 12 weeks in the top 40. A number of on-air radio broadcasts were also arranged.

In 2015 the AMA charts combined Internet radio with the terrestrial stations. During the Riverman's Daughter release this was not the case. On the terrestrial side there were 2561 spins during the charting period and approximately 500+ spins on the internet side.

The album was supported by music videos for the songs "Revival Time", "A Good Man", "Down by the River", "Cathedral Pines", and "Marni Hawkins".

In the summer and fall of 2014, and around their Australia tour, The Grahams conceived of their next creative enterprise, which again incorporated a journey through a historical American musical landscape. In preparation for their second album, the band traveled the country by rail, not only visiting iconic musical destinations, but traveling by one, as the railroad had been the conduit for inspiration for many of the forefathers of American roots music. In addition, the band came up with the idea to document part of their rail journey on film, and to recreate the new songs in a live setting at iconic recording studios along the way. With the new album being recorded with Grammy nominated producer Wes Sharon in Norman, Oklahoma, and a documentary film and live recordings in the works, 2015 would see the release of three major creations by The Grahams; their second album Glory Bound, the musical documentary by North Mississippi Allstars' Cody Dickinson, Rattle the Hocks, and the live in studio album Rattle the Hocks.

Prior to release a tour ensued to test the waters of the new material and show the film in club settings. Beginning the new year with 30A, FAI & SXSW & two shows at the AMA Music Conference.

In 2015 the band played over 75 shows, 15 of which featured the Rattle the Hocks film as the opener. The band played four in-store performances and performed at the RED party at the AEC retail convention. During the year the band shared the stage with Ray Wylie Hubbard, Leon Russell, Parker Milsap, The Wood Brothers, and the Black Lillie’s, John Fullbright, among others.

Rattle the Hocks was submitted for all appropriate film festivals and was screened at five; San Jose, Napa; Crossroads, Chagrin and Raindance (UK). The band performed at Chagrin and Raindance, playing the historic 100 Club.

In August 2019, the band announced plans to release a new album, Kids Like Us, in early 2020, written during their motorcycle journey down Route 66. The first single from the album "Just What You Deserve" was released in June, followed by "Bite My Tongue" in September. Third single 'Heartbroken Town' was released November 2019 and was accompanied by a music video shot at the famed Abbey Road studios in London, during a break from touring that summer. Fourth single 'Painted Desert' premiered with Billboard in January 2020. The title track to the album ,'Kids Like Us' was worked at US triple A commercial and non-commercial radio stations nationwide following the album's release (March 27, 2020), and the video for the track debuted with BandsInTown, May 2020.

The Grahams announced their first new music since the pandemic began, in August 2021. Releasing first single 'Beyond The Palisades' followed by the 3-track EP 'Sha La La', featuring the songs 'Pilgrims & Punks' and 'Love Collector'. The music video for Love Collector was filmed at the David Lynch inspired House Of Cards in Nashville, TN. The EP was recorded by the band at their East Nashville studio 3Sirens and saw them reunite with longtime friend Dan Molad (Lucius, Coco), who had stepped in to complete production of their previous studio album, Kids Like Us, after the untimely deal of lead producer Richard Swift.

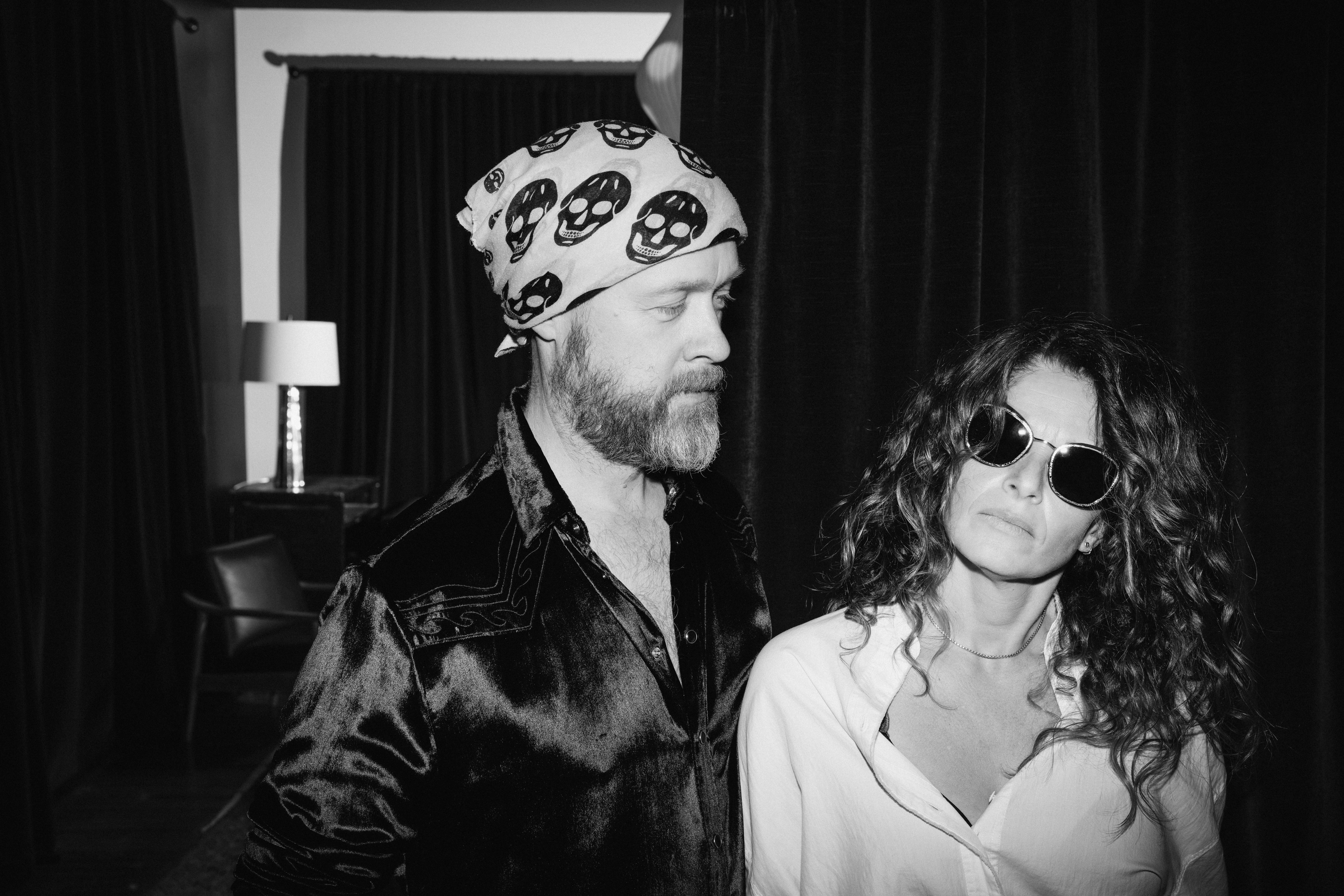
The Grahams photographed by Alex Berger at 3Sirens Studio, East Nashville, TN.

In 2022 The Grahams' 3Sirens label released the first album by another artist - East Nashville favorite and friend Derek Hoke's 'Electric Mountain'. Soon after, the first 3Sirens Session was released by early supporter and friend, John Doe. In Spring 2023, the next 3Sirens Session was released, featuring 3 unreleased tracks by David Garza, affectionately referred to as the 'third siren' by The Grahams. The label has also released several compilation albums, including 3Sirens Presents: With Love Parts 1 & 2, featuring popular 80s and 90s cover songs, performed by Lilly Hiatt, Elizabeth Cook, Andrew Combs, Dylan LeBlanc and more.

The Grahams returned with their self-titled album 'The Grahams' in September 2023, featuring 10 of their favorite songs from their first 3 studio albums, reimagined to reflect their latest sound. Recorded at their 3Sirens studio in East nashville and reuniting again with producer and friend Dan Molad (Lucius, Coco).

== Selected discography ==
- 2013 – Riverman's Daughter (3Sirens)
- 2015 – Rattle the Hocks (3Sirens)
- 2016 – Glory Bound (3Sirens)
- 2017 – The Grahams and Friends (3Sirens)
- 2021 – Sha La La (3Sirens)
- 2023 – The Grahams (3Sirens)

Source: AllMusic
