= List of New West Records artists =

The following is a list of artists who have recorded for New West Records.

- 49 Winchester
- Acetone
- Aaron Lee Tasjan
- Alice Cooper
- All Them Witches
- Anthony D'Amato
- Austin Lucas
- Billy Joe Shaver
- Ben Folds
- Ben Lee
- Benji Hughes
- Buffalo Tom
- Buddy Miller
- Caroline Rose
- Chuck Prophet
- Color Green
- Corb Lund
- Daniel Romano
- Delbert McClinton
- The Drams
- Drive-By Truckers
- The Ben Miller Band
- The Coward Brothers
- The Deslondes
- Dwight Yoakam
- Emily Nenni
- Esther Rose
- The Flatlanders
- Ian Hunter
- Jaime Wyatt
- Jason Isbell
- Jason James
- JD McPherson
- James McMurtry
- Jana Mila
- Joshua Hedley
- Jon Dee Graham
- Jordan Zevon
- Justin Townes Earle
- Kacy & Clayton
- Kristina Murray
- Kris Kristofferson
- Lilly Hiatt
- Lily and Madeleine
- Los Lobos
- Luther Dickinson
- The Mastersons
- Nada Surf
- Naked Giants
- North Mississippi Allstars
- The Nude Party
- Patty Griffin
- Patterson Hood
- Pernice Brothers
- Pokey LaFarge
- Pylon
- The Replacements
- Richard Thompson
- Rickie Lee Jones
- Robert Ellis
- Rodney Crowell
- Ron Gallo
- Riley Downing
- Sara Watkins
- Sammy Brue
- The Secret Sisters
- Seratones
- Shovels & Rope
- Slobberbone
- Stephen Bruton
- Susto
- The Wildmans
- Tim Easton
- Tony Joe White
- Town Mountain
- The Wallflowers
- The Whigs
- The Whistles & The Bells
- The Wild Feathers
- Wild Moccasins
