= Live (Delbert McClinton album) =

Live album by Delbert McClinton
- Released: October 21, 2003
- Recorded: April 2003
- Venue: Bergen Musicfest / Ole Blues 2003 at Teatergaragen in Bergen
- Genre: Blues
- Length: 88:55
- Label: New West Records
- Producer: Delbert McClinton

Delbert McClinton chronology
Room to Breathe (2002)	Live (2003)	Cost of Living (2005)

Live is Delbert McClinton's 2nd live album and 23rd album overall. It is a double-disc album and was released on October 21, 2003. The album was recorded at the Bergen Musicfest / Ole Blues 2003 at Teatergaragen in Bergen, Norway.

== Critical reception ==
Professional ratings
Review scores
Source	Rating
AllMusic	4/5 stars
The Austin Chronicle	3/5 stars

Hal Horowitz writes in his AllMusic review that "this is a nearly perfect document of Delbert McClinton, captured in his natural habitat with all the sweat, intensity, and frisky fun intact."

== Track listing ==
Disc 1
No.	Title	Writer(s)	Length
1.	"Old Weakness (Comin' On Strong)"	Bob DiPiero; Gary Nicholson	3:08
2.	"Leap Of Faith"	Glen Clark; Nicholson	6:05
3.	"I'm With You"	Mickey Jupp	4:29
4.	"I Wanna Thank You Baby"	Delbert McClinton	3:54
5.	"I Want To Love You"	McClinton	8:53
6.	"Smooth Talk"	McClinton; Nicholson	3:40
7.	"Maybe Someday Baby"	McClinton	3:39
8.	"Don't Want To Love You"	McClinton; Billy Lawson	3:18
9.	"New York City"	McClinton; Tom Faulkner	4:14
10.	"Squeeze Me In"	McClinton; Nicholson	2:48
11.	"I've Got Dreams To Remember"	Otis Redding; Zelma Redding; Joe Rock	5:18
Total length:			49:26

Disc 2
No.	Title	Writer(s)	Length
1.	"Why Me?"	McClinton; J. Fred Knobloch	3:50
2.	"Rebecca, Rebecca"	Traditional	6:39
3.	"Going Back To Louisiana"	Robert Eugene Osborn	4:32
4.	"When Rita Leaves"	McClinton; Nicholson	5:16
5.	"Livin' It Down"	McClinton; Nicholson; Benmont Tench	3:09
6.	"Giving It Up For Your Love"	Jerry Lynn Williams	3:22
7.	"B-Movie Boxcar Blues"	McClinton	8:47
8.	"Little Fine Healthy Thing"	William R. Emerson	3:54
Total length:			39:29

== Musicians ==
- Delbert McClinton: Vocals, Harmonica
- Kevin McKendree: Keyboards
- George Hawkins: Bass
- Rob McNelley: Guitar
- Lynn Williams: Drums
- Terry Townson: Trumpet
- Don Wise: Saxophone

== Production ==
- Wendy Goldstein: Executive Producer
- Cameron Strang: Executive Producer
- Delbert McClinton: Producer
- Njaal Oyvind Mangersnes: Engineer
- Arild Grindheim: Engineer
- Don Smith: Mixing
- Doug Sax: Mastering
- Robert Hadley: Mastering
- Ragena Warden: Production Coordinator
- John McElroy: House Sound
- Mark Allison: Stage Sound
- All track information and credits were taken from the album's liner notes.
