= Anarchist Gospel =

Studio album by Sunny War
- Released: February 3, 2023
- Studio: The Bomb Shelter, Nashville, Tennessee, US
- Genre: Folk punk
- Language: English
- Label: New West
- Producer: Andrija Tokic

Sunny War chronology
| Simple Syrup (2021) | Anarchist Gospel (2023) | Armageddon in a Summer Dress (2025) |

Anarchist Gospel is a 2023 studio album by American folk punk musician Sunny War. The album has received positive reception from critics.

== Reception ==
According to the review aggregator Metacritic, Anarchist Gospel received "universal acclaim" based on a weighted average score of 82 out of 100 from eight critic scores. In American Songwriter, Hal Horowitz gave this album 3.5 out of 5 stars, stating that the varied tracks "speak to War's prolific nature, one that encompasses her diversity yet remains focused on vocal, lyrical, and melodic talents that this disc's enhanced production, and budget, spotlight". Later in the year, that publication also chose War as one of five solo artist readers should be listening to on the strength of this album, her guitar-picking style, and "haunting" lyrics. Online retailer Bandcamp chose this as Album of the Day, with critic John Morrison calling it "a stellar work of art" for its ability to explore African-American culture and music. In Glide Magazine, John Moore noted that War's sound "embodies the original 1970s fuck the rulebook punk rock ethos" that mixes emotionally heavy personal experience with an ability to move on. At The Line of Best Fit, Janne Oinonen scored this album 8 out of 10, calling it a "resilient, wise, troubled and bracingly honest distillation" of "traumatic experiences". Louder Than War's Gordon Rutherford gave this release 4 out of 5, calling it "2023's first great album" and also War's "most compelling" that displays "a continual conflict at play between the uplifting, euphoric feel to the music and the bleak starkness of her lyrics".

Victoria Segal of Mojo rated Anarchist Gospel 4 out of 5 stars for music that has "a remarkable sense of stillness, an eye-of-the-storm clarity" alongside the emotionally difficult themes in the lyrics. Writing for Pitchfork, Stephen Thomas Erlewine scored this release a 7.4 out of 10, calling War's folk punk on this album "a more expansive, considered sound, blending various strains of American roots music into a quietly idiosyncratic style" and praising the emotionality, humor, and mix of "wry reticence and bruised confession" in the lyrics. At PopMatters, Rick Quinn gave this album an 8 out of 10, calling it "a testament to clear-eyed persistence and gritty hope over fantasies of easy resolutions". Editors at Rolling Stone chose this for their Hear This recommendation and critic Jonathan Bernstein called it "a powerful statement from a singer-songwriter poised to become one of the year's most vital voices in roots music".

Uncut ranked this the 34th best album of 2023. Uncut editor Michael Bonner included this album on his list of the best of the year. Editors at Rolling Stone included this among the best country and Americana albums of 2023. Matt Mitchell of Paste included this among the 30 best country, folk, and Americana albums of 2023.

== Track listing ==
All songs written by Sunny War, except where noted.

1. "Love's Death Bed" – 3:00
2. "No Reason" – 2:39
3. "Shelter and Storm" – 2:40
4. "I Got No Fight" – 4:59
5. "Swear to Gawd" (Chris Pierce and War) – 2:49
6. "Earth" – 3:23
7. "New Day" – 3:21
8. "Baby Bitch" (Gene Ween and Dean Ween) – 2:57
9. "His Love" – 2:31
10. "Hopeless" (Van Hunt) – 4:56
11. "Higher" – 3:23
12. "Test Dummy" – 2:24
13. "Sweet Nothing" – 7:07
14. "Whole" – 3:19

== Personnel ==
"Love's Death Bed"

- Sunny War – acoustic guitar, vocals
- Kyshona Armstrong – backing vocals
- Megan Britt Coleman – drums, percussion
- Nickie Conley – backing vocals
- Dennis Crouch – upright bass
- Maureen Murphy – backing vocals
- Chris Pierce – harmonica, vocals
- Allison Russell – vocals
- Jo Schornikow – organ
- John James Tourville – guitar

"No Reason"

- Sunny War – acoustic guitar, electric bass, vocals
- Kyshona Armstrong – backing vocals
- Megan Britt Coleman – drums
- Nickie Conley – backing vocals
- Jack Lawrence – bass guitar
- Maureen Murphy – backing vocals
- Jo Schornikow – piano, organ
- John James Tourville – timpani

"Shelter and Storm"

- Sunny War – acoustic guitar, vocals
- Megan Britt Coleman – drums, handclaps
- Jack Lawrence – bass guitar, synthesizer
- David Rawlings – banjo
- Jo Schornikow – piano
- John James Tourville – baritone guitar, bowed cymbal

"I Got No Fight"

- Sunny War – acoustic guitar, electric guitar, vocals
- Kyshona Armstrong – backing vocals
- Megan Britt Coleman – drums
- Nickie Conley – backing vocals
- Jack Lawrence – bass guitar
- Maureen Murphy – backing vocals
- Jo Schornikow – Farfisa electric organ, vibraphone
- Andrija Tokic – percussion
- John James Tourville – guitar

"Swear to Gawd"

- Sunny War – acoustic guitar, vocals
- Megan Britt Coleman – drums, percussion
- Chris Pierce – harmonica, vocals
- Dave Rawlings – acoustic guitar
- Jo Schornikow – Wurlitzer electric piano
- John James Tourville – guitar

"Baby Bitch"

- Sunny War – vocals
- Drew Carroll – children's choir
- Megan Britt Coleman – drums
- Sam Hoffman – children's choir
- Jack Lawrence – bass guitar
- Alec O'Connell – children's choir
- Dave Rawlings – high-strung acoustic guitar
- John James Tourville – acoustic guitar, 12-string guitar

"His Love"

- Sunny War – acoustic guitar, electric guitar, vocals
- Megan Britt Coleman – drums, percussion
- Jack Lawrence – bass guitar
- Jo Schornikow – Fender Rhodes electric piano
- John James Tourville – guitar, pedal steel guitar, dobro

"Whole"

- Sunny War – acoustic guitar, electric guitar, vocals
- Kyshona Armstrong – backing vocals
- Megan Britt Coleman – drums, percussion
- Nickie Conley – backing vocals
- Jack Lawrence – bass guitar
- Maureen Murphy – backing vocals
- Jo Schornikow – piano, organ
- John James Tourville – guitar

"New Day"

- Sunny War – acoustic guitar, electric guitar, vocals
- Billy Contreras – strings
- Dennis Crouch – upright bass

"Earth"

- Sunny War – acoustic guitar, vocals
- Dennis Crouch – upright bass
- Kyshona Armstrong – backing vocals
- Megan Britt Coleman – drums, percussion
- Nickie Conley – backing vocals
- Jim James – backing vocals
- Maureen Murphy – backing vocals
- Micah Nelson – 12-string guitar
- Jo Schornikow – organ
- John James Tourville – pedal steel guitar, percussion

"Hopeless"

- Sunny War – acoustic guitar, vocals
- Megan Britt Coleman – percussion
- Dennis Crouch – upright bass
- Chris Pierce – backing vocals
- Allison Russell – backing vocals

"Higher"

- Sunny War – acoustic guitar, vocals
- Megan Britt Coleman – drums
- Jack Lawrence – bass guitar
- Dave Rawlings – acoustic guitar
- Jo Schornikow – Mellotron, piano
- John James Tourville – pedal steel guitar

"Test Dummy"

- Sunny War – acoustic guitar, vocals
- Megan Britt Coleman – drums, percussion
- Jo Schornikow – synthesizer
- John James Tourville – guitar, baritone guitar

"Sweet Nothing"

- Sunny War – acoustic guitar, vocals
- Billy Contreras – strings
- Dennis Crouch – bass guitar
- Jo Schornikow – piano
- John James Tourville – Omnichord, timpani, vibraphone

Technical personnel

- April Bey – cover art
- Matt Etgen – package design
- Dave Gardner – mastering at Infrasonic Mastering, Los Angeles, California, United States
- John Tellmann – assistant engineering
- Andrija Tokic – engineering, production
- Nick Townsend – vinyl mastering at Record Technology Incorporated
- Joshua Black Wilkins – photography

== See also ==
- 2023 in American music
- List of 2023 albums
