= Mind, Man, Medicine =

Studio album by the Secret Sisters
- Released: March 29, 2024
- Studio: FAME Studios (Muscle Shoals, Alabama)
- Length: 39:37
- Label: New West
- Producer: The Secret Sisters; Ben Tanner; John Paul White

The Secret Sisters chronology
| Saturn Return (2020) | Mind, Man, Medicine (2024) |

Mind, Man, Medicine is the fifth studio album by American duo the Secret Sisters. It was released on March 29, 2024, by New West Records. The album was co-produced by the duo alongside Ben Tanner and John Paul White.

== Background ==
In a press release, the Secret Sisters said that this album comes at a point "where we seek, savor, and settle", further adding: "The muse found us in the depths of raising children, nurturing relationships, surviving a world-changing virus, bidding farewell, shifting our mindsets and discovering a sense of peace heretofore unseen. Our third decade of life has proven to be one of routine, rest, and realization, and these songs are about the lessons we've learned. We've learned to be space-holders and defenders of the people we hold close. We've learned from deep, steady love in various forms. We've learned to let go of people and perceptions and priorities that just didn't make the cut as we weighed what is right and important and worth keeping. We've learned how all the things we've always treasured continue to withstand the pressure of time." The album was recorded in the band's hometown of Muscle Shoals, Alabama, mainly at the FAME Studios with the duo co-producing it with Ben Tanner and John Paul White.

== Promotion ==
The album was announced on January 10, 2024 simultaneously with the release of the lead single "Same Water". The Secret Sisters wrote the track with the intent of "trying to make sense of the ways we all choose to find healing, as a society and as individuals".

== Critical reception ==
Writing for No Depression, Jon Young opined that the album was filled with "insightful compassion and unflinching honesty" and concluded his review by remarking that the album "[felt] like one vivid chapter in a gripping saga" and hoped that the duo's future releases continues this narrative.

== Track listing ==
Mind, Man, Medicine track listing
| No. | Title | Writer(s) | Length |
|---|---|---|---|
| 1. | "Space" | Laura Rogers; Lydia Slagle; Daniel Tashian; Jessie Baylin | 3:57 |
| 2. | "Paperweight" | Slagle; Kate York | 3:14 |
| 3. | "If the World Was a House" | Rogers; Slagle; York; Ruston Kelly | 4:26 |
| 4. | "All the Ways" (featuring Ray LaMontagne) | Rogers; Slagle | 3:38 |
| 5. | "Planted" | Slagle | 3:27 |
| 6. | "Never Walk Away" | Rogers; Slagle | 2:18 |
| 7. | "I Needed You" | Rogers; Slagle; KS Rhoads | 3:34 |
| 8. | "Bear with Me" | Rogers; Slagle | 4:02 |
| 9. | "Same Water" | Rogers; Slagle | 4:20 |
| 10. | "I Can Never Be Without You Anymore" | Rogers; Slagle; York | 3:20 |
| 11. | "I've Got Your Back" | Slagle; Jessie Baylin; Sarah Buxton | 3:21 |
| Total length: | | | 39:37 |
