= Change of Plans (album) =

Studio album by 49 Winchester
- Released: May 15, 2026
- Studios: Thunderbolt Sound Studios, Savannah, Georgia
- Genres: Alternative country; Americana
- Length: 38:53
- Label: New West Records
- Producer: Dave Cobb

49 Winchester chronology
Leavin' This Holler (2024)	Change of Plans (2026)

Singles from Change of Plans
- 1. "Changes" Released: November 7, 2025; 2. "Pardon Me" Released: February 6, 2026; 3. "Slowly" Released: April 3, 2026; 4. "Oh Savannah" Released: May 8, 2026

Change of Plans is the sixth studio album by American country music group 49 Winchester. It was released on May 15, 2026, through New West and Lucille Records and was produced by Dave Cobb It was preceded by the singles "Changes", "Pardon Me", "Slowly", and "Oh Savannah".

== Background ==
After touring concluded for their previous album, Leavin' This Holler, the band began work on the follow-up. Frontman Isaac Gibson explained the evolution of the band's sound and the album's title in an interview with Rolling Stone, stating that, "each record we’ve made has been a distinct chapter in our life. I’ve felt it kind of level up, up, and up. I think that this jump is more drastic than it has ever been from album to album. The big, overarching theme of this record is how much our lives have changed since we started this band. We’ve got families. We’re getting married. That’s why ‘Change’ resonated with us so much." Gibson, who wrote all nine of the album's original songs, expressed that he went through a break-up and then entered a new relationship that "changed [his] life forever" and was a major influence on the album.

The band chose to record the album in Savannah, Georgia rather than in a Nashville studio alongside Dave Cobb. Bassist Chase Chafin explained of the recording sessions that, "we all knew it had some weight to it. We’re going in with less of a DIY approach and working with a very accomplished producer. We were excited to get away and focus on the songs. Between Dave and Isaac, they were kind of running the session. It was a very open and collaborative effort."

=== Singles ===
On November 7, 2025, the band released a cover of Black Sabbath's "Changes". Gibson expressed that the band had been considering including a cover song on their upcoming album and were inspired to select "Changes" following the death of Ozzy Osbourne in July 2025. Gibson explained that, "we grew up listening to, and loving, heavy metal. When you’re a kid — and we grew up in the age that had access to the Internet — you go and you do your research. Know what I mean? We were into Sabbath 45 years after the height of their popularity. That’s a testament to great music. Ozzy was a great singer, and we’ve always been fascinated with him." The cover ultimately made the album, and appears as the third track.

Change of Plans was officially announced on February 6, 2026, alongside the release of "Pardon Me", the second single. The song is one that finds the band "leaning into emotional honesty and lived-in storytelling, balancing rugged instrumentation with a sense of vulnerability and growth".

The third single from the album, "Slowly", was released on April 3, 2026. It was described in a promotional statement as "a reflective, slow-burning track that showcases the acclaimed band’s signature blend of Southern rock grit and country soul." Gibson expressed that the song is influenced by his past struggles with alcohol.

On May 8, 2026, the band unveiled the final single from the project, "Oh Savannah", a "soul-stirring" and "deeply evocative" ode to Savannah, Georgia where the recording sessions for Change of Plans took place.

== Track listing ==
Change of Plans track listing
No.	Title	Writer(s)	Length
1.	"The Window"	Isaac Gibson; Matt Koziol	4:02
2.	"Bluebird"	Gibson; Koziol	3:55
3.	"Changes"	Terrence Butler; Tony Iommi; Ozzy Osbourne; William Ward	5:29
4.	"All Around Me"	Gibson	3:00
5.	"Slowly"	Jessie Jo Dillon; Gibson; Chris Tompkins	3:11
6.	"All Over Again"	Gibson	3:56
7.	"Oh Savannah"	Dillon; Gibson; Tompkins	3:05
8.	"Bringin' Home the Bacon"	Gibson; Aaron Raitiere	3:31
9.	"Pardon Me"	Gibson	4:04
10.	"Heavy Chevy"	Gibson	4:35
Total length:			38:53

== Credits and personnel ==
Credits adapted from Tidal.

49 Winchester

- Isaac Gibson - vocals, acoustic guitar, electric guitar
- Chase Chafin - bass
- Tim Hall - piano, keyboard, organ, synthesizer
- Justin Louthian - drums
- Noah Patrick - pedal steel
- Bus Shelton - electric guitar

=== Other personnel ===
- Daniel Bacigalupi - mastering
- Ethan Barette - recording, engineering
- Dave Cobb - production, mixing, percussion, acoustic guitar
- Pete Lyman - mastering, engineering
- Tom Tapley - engineering, mixing, recording

== Charts ==
Chart performance for Change of Plans
Chart (2026)	Peak position
UK Americana Albums (Official Charts)	29
US Top Album Sales (Billboard)	36
