= Rock the Boat =

Rock the Boat may refer to:

- "Rock the Boat" (The Hues Corporation song), 1974
- "Rock the Boat" (Aaliyah song), 2001
- "Rock the Boat" (Bob Sinclar song), featuring Pitbull, Dragonfly and Fatman Scoop, 2011
- Rock the Boat (imprint), an imprint of Oneworld Publications

== See also ==
- Sit Down, You're Rockin' the Boat, a 1950 song by Frank Loesser
- The Boat That Rocked, a 2009 British comedy film
- Rocking the Boat: A Musical Conversation and Journey, a 2007 documentary film
