= Cost of Living (Delbert McClinton album) =

Studio album by Delbert McClinton
- Released: August 23, 2005
- Recorded: March 8–10, 2004; February 7–8, 2005
- Studio: Fearless (Nashville, Tennessee); Sound Emporium (Nashville, Tennessee)
- Genre: Americana; blues rock; country
- Length: 40:47
- Label: New West
- Producer: Delbert McClinton; Gary Nicholson

Delbert McClinton chronology
Room to Breathe (2002)	Cost of Living (2005)	Rockin' Blues (2007)

Professional ratings
Review scores
Source	Rating
All About Jazz	4.5/5 stars
AllMusic	4/5 stars
Robert Christgau	(choice cut)

Cost of Living is a solo studio album by American blues rock singer and songwriter Delbert McClinton. It was released on August 23, 2005, through New West Records, making it his third studio album for the label. The recording sessions took place in Nashville, Tennessee, at Fearless Recording on March 8–10, 2004, and at The Sound Emporium on February 7–8, 2005. It was produced by McClinton and Gary Nicholson, with Wendy Goldstein and Cameron Strang serving as executive producers.

The album peaked at number 105 on the Billboard 200, number 14 on the Top Country Albums, number 16 on the Independent Albums, and topped the Blues Albums chart in the United States.

At the 48th Annual Grammy Awards, the album won a Grammy Award for Best Contemporary Blues Album. The song "Midnight Communion" from the album was nominated for a Grammy Award for Best Male Country Vocal Performance but lost to Keith Urban's "You'll Think of Me".

== Track listing ==
No.	Title	Writer(s)	Length
1.	"One of the Fortunate Few"	Delbert McClinton; Gary Nicholson; Al Anderson; Tom Hambridge	2:47
2.	"Right to Be Wrong"	McClinton; Nicholson; Hambridge	2:41
3.	"The Part I Like Best"	McClinton; Glen Clark	2:17
4.	"I'll Change My Style"	David Parker; Manuel Villa	2:36
5.	"Hammerhead Stew"	McClinton; John Barlow Jarvis	2:53
6.	"Your Memory, Me, and the Blues"	McClinton; Jim Weatherly	4:05
7.	"Dead Wrong"	McClinton	2:02
8.	"Down into Mexico"	McClinton; Nicholson; Bob DiPiero	4:35
9.	"Kiss Her Once for Me"	McClinton; Nicholson; Hambridge	4:01
10.	"I Had a Real Good Time"	McClinton; Anderson; Nicholson; Hambridge	2:27
11.	"Midnight Communion"	McClinton; Nicholson; Russell Smith	4:10
12.	"Two Step Too"	McClinton	3:02
13.	"Alright by Me"	McClinton; Kevin McKendree	3:11
Total length:			40:47

== Personnel ==
- Delbert McClinton – vocals, harmonica, acoustic guitar (tracks: 3, 10), producer
- Kevin McKendree – piano, organ
- Rob McNelley – acoustic and electric guitar solos
- Lynn Williams – drums
- Spencer Campbell – acoustic and electric bass
- Don Wise – saxophone
- Steve Mackey – bass (tracks: 2, 4, 7, 12)
- Bill Campbell – guitar (tracks: 2, 4, 7)
- James Pennebaker – acoustic, electric and steel guitar & fiddle (track 12)
- Stuart Duncan – fiddle (tracks: 9–11)
- Jim Hoke – saxophone (tracks: 4–6)
- Al Anderson – acoustic guitar (track 10)
- Tom Hambridge – percussion (track 2), additional vocals (tracks: 1, 2)
- Gary Nicholson – acoustic guitar (tracks: 1, 3, 8, 11), electric guitar (track 5), producer, additional recording
- Bekka Bramlett – additional vocals (track 5)
- Crystal Talifaro – additional vocals (track 5)
- Jeffrey Steele – additional vocals (tracks: 11, 12)
- Russell Smith – additional vocals (track 11)
- Dave Sinko – recording (tracks: 2, 4, 7, 12, 13)
- Matt Andrews – recording (tracks: 1, 3, 5, 6, 8–11)
- Patrick Granado – recording assistant
- Ray Kennedy – mixing, mastering
- Jim Demain – mastering
- Wendy Goldstein – executive producer
- Cameron Strang – executive producer
- Ragena Warden – production assistance
- Nathan Nicholson – production assistance
- Michael Wilson – photography
- Glenn Sweitzer – art direction, design

== Charts ==
=== Weekly charts ===
Chart (2005)	Peak position
US Billboard 200	105
US Top Country Albums (Billboard)	14
US Independent Albums (Billboard)	16
US Top Blues Albums (Billboard)	1

=== Year-end charts ===
Chart (2006)	Position
US Top Blues Albums (Billboard)	10
