= Tall, Dark and Handsome =

Tall, Dark and Handsome may refer to:

- Tall, dark and handsome, a phrase that refers to an appealing man
- Tall, Dark and Handsome (film), a 1941 American comedy crime film
- Tall, Dark, and Handsome (album), a 2019 album by Delbert McClinton
