= Leavin' This Holler =

Studio album by 49 Winchester
- Released: August 2, 2024
- Genres: Alternative country; Americana
- Length: 42:48
- Label: New West Records
- Producers: 49 Winchester; Stewart Myers

49 Winchester chronology
Fortune Favors the Bold (2022)	Leavin' This Holler (2024)	Change of Plans (2026)

Singles from Leavin' This Holler
- 1. "Yearnin' For You" Released: April 9, 2024; 2. "Fast Asleep" Released: May 22, 2024; 3. "Tulsa" Released: June 22, 2024; 4. "Make It Count / Hillbilly Happy" Released: July 16, 2024

Leavin' This Holler is the fifth studio album by American country music group 49 Winchester. It was released on August 2, 2024, through New West Records and was produced by the band alongside Stewart Myers. The project features ten tracks and includes the singles "Yearnin' For You", "Fast Asleep", "Tulsa", "Make It Count", and "Hillbilly Happy". They embarked on a tour to support the album.

== Background ==
49 Winchester teased a special announcement on April 8, 2024, posting a picture of a billboard on their Instagram that read "tomorrow is 4/9. Are you ready?". On April 9, 2024, Russell County, Virginia declared it "49 Winchester Day", and the band announced their fifth album, Leavin' This Holler, alongside the release of lead single "Yearnin' For You". Sharing the story behind the song, band member Isaac Gibson released a statement explaining “When I wrote this song, I felt like it really encapsulated what it’s like to be a musician, and more specifically that other side of the coin that fans don’t see as often. The people you miss so badly, the sacrifice that it takes to forge out a living. I think more importantly it’s a love song. It’s about reuniting with the one that holds you down, and how great it is to finally be back where you are loved. Absence makes the heart grow fonder,” these words of wisdom are evident throughout the entirety of 'Yearnin’ For You.”

"Fast Asleep", the album's second single", was released on May 22, 2024. Described by the band as an "emotional sledgehammer", it was reported to be one of the very first songs they had written when they formed in 2013 and was a staple of their early live sets but had fallen by the wayside in favor of newer songs until the group decided to rework and revive it for Leavin' This Holler. The track features the Czech National Symphony Orchestra, and the band stated “We’re very proud of how it turned out and can’t wait for you to hear!” In a statement about the track, Gibson praised the contributions of the orchestra and band member Noah Patrick's steel guitar and explained “we knew it was still a great song and wanted to breathe new life into it, and I think we achieved that”.

"Tulsa", the third single an ode to the state of Oklahoma and marijuana, was released on June 27, 2024. Describing the track, Gibson stated “This song is a rock and roller with an interesting backstory: I wrote it on a frigid night in 2022, leaving a show at the Mercury Lounge in Tulsa. It was in the middle of a blizzard on the way to a run of shows through Texas. The interstate was covered in snow. We jack-knifed the van and trailer sideways on the road and it was just a sketchy situation altogether. My anxiety wasn’t helped by the fact that Oklahoma had just recently legalized a plant we’ve been known to be fond of, and that’s ultimately where the song came from. It’s one of those snapshots of a moment in time in my life where I just put pen to paper to ease my mind.” The song also references the 1978 hit "Tulsa Time" and it's songwriter Don Williams.

The final two singles, "Make It Count" and "Hillbilly Happy" were jointly released on July 16, 2024. Of the latter, the Gibson stated “'Hillbilly Happy' is the rocker on the record. When I wrote it, I wanted something that felt like a summertime anthem—a fun song that also hits hard enough to kind of be a cut-lose-and-slam-it-home moment on stage. It’s definitely one of my favorite songs I’ve ever written to play live and I love how it turned out on the record.”

"Miles To Go" was originally planned to be included on the album, but had to be removed because the album was too long to fit onto vinyl. It was subsequently released as a standalone single on December 13, 2024, after being featured in an episode of Yellowstone.

== Track listing ==
Adapted from Discogs.

Leavin' This Holler track listing
No.	Title	Writer(s)	Length
1.	"Favor"	Isaac Gibson; Kendell Marvel	3:53
2.	"Hilbilly Happy"	Gibson	4:11
3.	"Yearnin' For You"	Gibson; Matt Koziol	3:35
4.	"Make It Count"	Gibson; Stewart Myers	4:00
5.	"Leavin' This Holler" (featuring Maggie Antone)	Gibson; Myers	5:50
6.	"Fast Asleep"	Gibson	4:32
7.	"Tulsa"	Gibson; Myers	4:14
8.	"Rest of My Days"	Gibson; Myers	3:30
9.	"Traveling Band"	Gibson	3:20
10.	"Anchor"	Gibson	5:39
Total length:			42:48

== Charts ==
Chart performance for Leavin' This Holler
Chart (2024)	Peak position
UK Album Breakers(OCC)	9
UK Americana (OCC)	24
UK Downloads (OCC)	50
UK Independent Albums (OCC)	39
