= On Time (disambiguation) =

On Time is a 1969 album by Grand Funk Railroad.

On Time may also refer to:

== Music ==
- On Time (Les McCann album) or the title song, 1962
- On Time, an album by Ilegales, 2001
- On Time, an album by Mingo Fishtrap, 2014
- "On Time" (song), by the Bee Gees, 1972
- "On Time", a song by Ufo361, 2019
- "On Time", a song by Metro Boomin featuring John Legend, 2022

== Other uses ==
- On Time (film), a 1924 American film
- OnTime, software by Axosoft
- On Time, a poem in Milton's 1645 Poems
