= Nothing Personal (Delbert McClinton album) =

Studio album by Delbert McClinton
- Released: March 6, 2001
- Studio: House of Blues (Los Angeles, California); Sound Emporium (Nashville, Tennessee); East Iris (Nashville, Tennessee); The Doghouse (Nashville, Tennessee); Station West (Nashville, Tennessee)
- Genre: Americana; blues rock; blues; roots rock; country
- Length: 49:42
- Label: New West
- Producer: Delbert McClinton; Gary Nicholson

Delbert McClinton chronology
One of the Fortunate Few (1997)	Nothing Personal (2001)	Room to Breathe (2002)

Professional ratings
Review scores
Source	Rating
AllMusic	4/5 stars
The Austin Chronicle	3.5/5 stars
Entertainment Weekly	B+

Nothing Personal is a solo studio album by American blues rock singer-songwriter Delbert McClinton. It was released on March 6, 2001, through New West Records, making it his first album for the label. Recording sessions took place at House of Blues Studio in Los Angeles, Sound Emporium and East Iris Studios in Nashville, Tennessee, with additional recording at The Doghouse and Station West in Nashville, TN. Production was handled by Gary Nicholson and McClinton himself.

The album peaked at number 103 on the Billboard 200, number 20 on the Top Country Albums, number 3 on the Independent Albums, and topped the Blues Albums chart in the United States.

In 2002, the album won a Grammy Award for Best Contemporary Blues Album at the 44th Annual Grammy Awards.

== Track listing ==
No.	Title	Writer(s)	Length
1.	"Livin' It Down"	Delbert McClinton; Gary Nicholson; Benmont Tench	2:41
2.	"Gotta Get It Worked On"	McClinton; Max D. Barnes	4:01
3.	"When Rita Leaves"	McClinton; Nicholson	4:37
4.	"Squeeze Me In"	McClinton; Nicholson	2:54
5.	"Birmingham Tonight"	McClinton; A.L. "Doodle" Owens	3:59
6.	"Baggage Claim"	McClinton	3:28
7.	"All Night Long"	McClinton; Mick Hany	4:05
8.	"Don't Leave Home Without It"	McClinton; Nicholson; Sharon Vaughn	3:39
9.	"Desperation"	McClinton	3:23
10.	"Nothin' Lasts Forever"	McClinton	3:04
11.	"Read Me My Rights"	McClinton; Johnny Neel	4:39
12.	"All There Is of Me"	McClinton; Nicholson	5:36
13.	"Watchin' the Rain"	McClinton	3:36
Total length:			49:42

== Personnel ==
- Delbert McClinton – lead vocals, electric guitar (tracks: 1, 9), harmonica (tracks: 2, 10), backing vocals (track 4), acoustic guitar (tracks: 6, 13), Wurlitzer electric piano (track 7), producer
- Gary Nicholson – slide guitar (track 1), classical guitar (track 3), acoustic guitar (track 5), electric guitar (track 11), producer
- Todd Sharp – electric guitar (tracks: 1, 4, 6, 7, 9), acoustic guitar (tracks: 11, 13)
- Kevin McKendree – keyboards (tracks: 1, 13), piano (tracks: 3, 4, 6, 7, 12), organ (track 8), Wurlitzer electric piano & Hammond B-3 organ (tracks: 9, 11)
- George Hawkins – bass (track: 1, 4, 6, 9, 11, 13)
- Lynn Williams – drums (tracks: 1, 4, 6, 9, 11, 13)
- Richard Dodd – tambourine (track 1), mixing
- Johnny Lee Schell – electric guitar (tracks: 2, 5, 7, 8, 10, 12), acoustic guitar (track 3)
- Rick Vito – electric guitar (tracks: 2, 8, 10, 12)
- Mark Jordan – Hammond B3 organ (track 2), organ (track 7), piano (track 11)
- "Hutch" Hutchinson – bass (tracks: 2, 3, 5, 7, 8, 12)
- Ricky Fataar – drums (tracks: 2, 3, 5, 7, 8, 10, 12)
- John Cowan – harmony vocals (track 3)
- Benmont Tench – Chamberlin (track 3), piano (tracks: 5, 8), organ (track 12)
- Iris DeMent – harmony vocals (track 5)
- Tommy Spurlock – steel guitar (track 5)
- Bekka Bramlett – backing vocals (track 7)
- Terry Townson – trumpet (track 13)
- Justin Niebank – recording, mixing (track 3)
- Don Smith – recording (tracks: 2, 3, 5, 7, 8, 10, 12), mixing (track 12)
- Neal Cappellino – additional recording
- Luke Wooten – additional recording
- Toby Seay – additional recording
- Kevin Szymanski – assistant recording (tracks: 1, 4, 6, 9, 13)
- Jim Danis – assistant recording (tracks: 2, 3, 5, 7, 8, 10, 12)
- Matt Andrews – assistant recording (track 11)
- Dan Leffler – assistant mixing (tracks: 1, 2, 4–11, 13)
- Erik Wolf – mastering
- Glenn Sweitzer – art direction, design
- Jim Herrington – photography

== Charts ==
=== Weekly charts ===
Chart (2001)	Peak position
US Billboard 200	103
US Top Country Albums (Billboard)	20
US Independent Albums (Billboard)	3
US Top Blues Albums (Billboard)	1

=== Year-end charts ===
Chart (2001)	Position
US Top Country Albums (Billboard)	74
