= Prick of the Litter =

Studio album by Delbert McClinton & Self-Made Men
- Released: January 27, 2017
- Studio: The Rock House (Franklin, Tennessee); Bedford (Brooklyn, New York City); Wire (Austin, Texas)
- Genre: Blues
- Length: 39:03
- Label: Hot Shot
- Producer: Bob Britt; Delbert McClinton; Kevin McKendree

Delbert McClinton chronology
Blind, Crippled and Crazy (2013)	Prick of the Litter (2017)	Tall, Dark, & Handsome (2019)

Prick of the Litter is the nineteenth studio album by American blues musician Delbert McClinton and his first album with Self-Made Men. It was released on January 27, 2017, through Hot Shot Records. The recording sessions took place at The Rock House in Franklin, Tennessee, and at Bedford Studio in Brooklyn, New York with additional recording at Wire Recording in Austin, Texas. It was produced by Bob Britt, Kevin McKendree, and McClinton.

The album peaked at number 77 on the Billboard Top Album Sales, number 14 on the Americana/Folk Albums, number 70 on the Top Current Album Sales, number 18 on both the Independent Albums and Tastemaker Albums, and number 2 the Blues Albums chart in the United States.

== Critical reception ==
Professional ratings
Aggregate scores
Source	Rating
Metacritic	80/100
Review scores
Source	Rating
All About Jazz	4/5 stars
AllMusic	4/5 stars
The Austin Chronicle	3.5/5 stars
PopMatters	8/10

Prick of the Litter was met with generally favorable reviews from music critics. At Metacritic, which assigns a normalized rating out of 100 to reviews from mainstream publications, the album received an average score of 80, based on five reviews.

AllMusic's Thom Jurek wrote: "McClinton doesn't try to reinvent the wheel on Prick of the Litter, but he doesn't have to; his voice, despite his age, was made for songs like these, while the charts and band performances are equally inspired. This is a memorable date in a catalog full of them". Steve Horowitz of PopMatters wrote: "the dozen new tracks here could have been created at any time in McClinton's 50 years of recording. Sure, there are production and other musical elements (for one thing, this disc is extremely clean with zero bleeding noise; when there is no performance, there is no sound) that show its recent heritage, but the music enjoys a broader time span". Doug Freeman of The Austin Chronicle felt like "Delbert McClinton tears up the blues circuit, but the easy saturation of Prick of the Litter serves up its own satisfaction". Uncut reviewer praised the album with: "somewhere, Hoagy Carmichael, Johnny Mercer and Mose Allison are tapping their feet and smiling". In a mixed review, Blurt magazine critic stated: "the songs vacillate between solid, classic McClinton and ho-hum and you can't help but miss the more raucous, wilder Delbert".

== Track listing ==
No.	Title	Writer(s)	Length
1.	"Don't Do It"	Delbert McClinton; Gary Nicholson	3:22
2.	"Doin' What You Do"	McClinton; Bob Britt; Michael G. Joyce	3:43
3.	"Middle of Nowhere"	McClinton; Britt; Kevin McKendree; Glen Clark	3:20
4.	"Skip Chaser"	McClinton; Britt; McKendree; Clark	2:46
5.	"San Miguel"	McClinton; Britt; McKendree; Clark	3:47
6.	"Pulling the Strings"	McClinton; Britt; Joyce	3:56
7.	"Neva"	McClinton	2:36
8.	"Like Lovin' Used to Be"	McClinton; Britt; Joyce	3:04
9.	"Jones for You"	Tim Ouimette	3:19
10.	"The Hunt Is On"	Percy Mayfield	2:41
11.	"Bad Haircut"	McClinton; McKendree	3:06
12.	"Rosy"	McClinton; Britt; Joyce	3:23
Total length:			39:03

== Personnel ==
- Delbert McClinton – vocals, harmonica (track 2), producer, photography
- Bob Britt – guitar (tracks: 1–8, 12), producer
- Kevin McKendree – piano (tracks: 1, 4–12), electric piano & Hammond organ (tracks: 2, 3), vibes (track 6), guitar (track 10), producer, recording, mixing
- Michael G. "Mike" Joyce – bass (tracks: 1–5, 7, 8, 12)
- Jack Bruno – drums (tracks: 1–8, 12)
- Vicki Hampton – backing vocals (tracks: 2, 3, 8)
- Wendy Moten – backing vocals (tracks: 2, 3, 8)
- Jim Hoke – saxophone (tracks: 1, 4, 10), tenor saxophone (track 8)
- Quentin Ware – trumpet (tracks: 1, 4, 6, 10)
- Roy Agee – trombone (tracks: 1, 4, 10, 12)
- Jimmie Vaughan – guitar (track 1)
- Lou Ann Barton – vocals (track 1)
- Glen Clark – harmony vocals (track 4)
- Al Anderson – guitar (track 4)
- Mike Clark – drums (tracks: 9, 10)
- Tim Ouimette – trumpet (track 9)
- Jerry Z – Hammond organ (tracks: 9, 10)
- Kenneth Blevins – drums (track 11)
- Jeff Sarli – upright bass (track 11)
- Joe McGlohon – tenor saxophone (track 11)
- Andy Tommasi – recording
- Yates McKendree – engineering assistant
- Mark Allison – engineering assistant
- Jim Demain – mastering
- Anthony Scarlati – photography
- Todd V. Wolfson – additional photography

== Charts ==
Chart (2017)	Peak position
US Top Album Sales (Billboard)	77
US Americana/Folk Albums (Billboard)	14
US Independent Albums (Billboard)	18
US Top Blues Albums (Billboard)	2
US Indie Store Album Sales (Billboard)	18
