= Never Been Rocked Enough =

Studio album by Delbert McClinton
- Released: 1992
- Genre: Roots rock
- Length: 40:17
- Label: Curb
- Producers: Delbert McClinton, Jim Horn, Don Was, Bonnie Raitt

Delbert McClinton chronology
Best of Delbert McClinton (1991)	Never Been Rocked Enough (1992)	Feelin' Alright (1993)

Never Been Rocked Enough is a studio album by the American musician Delbert McClinton. It was released in 1992 by Curb Records. The first single was "Every Time I Roll the Dice". McClinton supported the album with a North American tour.

== Production ==
The album was produced by McClinton, Jim Horn, Don Was, and Bonnie Raitt; the two recording sessions took about a week and a half. Tom Petty and Melissa Etheridge provided backing vocals. "Have a Little Faith in Me" is a cover of the John Hiatt song. McClinton considered Never Been Rocked Enough to be his most radio-friendly album.

== Critical reception ==
Professional ratings
Review scores
Source	Rating
AllMusic	3/5 stars
Calgary Herald	A−
Windsor Star	B

The Calgary Herald concluded that "this isn't so much a sentimentalization of McClinton's brand of bar music, as its apotheosis." The Boston Globe determined that the album "captures his rough-edged, yet somehow polished, roadhouse sound."

The Windsor Star panned "the slick session musicians like the World's Most Dangerous Band." The Ottawa Citizen stated that "the album doesn't blow you away with volume or flash, but wins you over with its roots rockin' integrity and deep-brewed flavors of the southern U.S."

In a review for AllMusic, Roch Parisien wrote: "The results cover the whole checkerboard while remaining vintage McClinton: his harp wails on 'Everytime I Roll the Dice'; 'Can I Change My Mind' flirts with Motown soul; 'Blues as Blues Can Get' defines the confessional blues ballad."

== Chart performance ==
Never Been Rocked Enough peaked at number 118 on the Billboard 200 in July 18, 1992.

== Track listing ==
No.	Title	Writer(s)	Length
1.	"Every Time I Roll the Dice"	Max D. Barnes; Troy Seals	4:28
2.	"I Used to Worry" (featuring Francine Reed)	Tony Arata	2:53
3.	"Miss You Fever"	Dennis Morgan; Feargal Sharkey	4:06
4.	"Why Me?"	Fred Knobloch; Delbert McClinton	3:17
5.	"Have a Little Faith in Me"	John Hiatt	4:12
6.	"Never Been Rocked Enough"	McClinton; Seals	3:33
7.	"Blues as Blues Can Get"	Knobloch; Tim Krekel	4:05
8.	"Can I Change My Mind"	Barry Despenza; Carl Wolfolk	3:30
9.	"Cease and Desist"	McClinton	2:56
10.	"Stir It Up"	Bob Marley	3:32
11.	"Good Man, Good Woman" (featuring Bonnie Raitt)	Cecil Womack; Linda Womack	3:34
Total length:			40:17

== Personnel ==
- Delbert McClinton – vocals, harmonica, percussion
- Randy Jacobs, Turner Stephen Bruton, Waddy Wachtel, Dann Huff, Sid McGinnis, Cornell Dupree, Fred Knobloch – guitar
- Tom Petty – harmony vocals on "Why Me?"
- Francine Reed – harmony vocals on "I Used to Worry"
- Bonnie Raitt – slide guitar, acoustic guitar, vocals
- James "Hutch" Hutchinson, Will Lee, Francisco Centeno – bass guitar
- Benmont Tench – Hammond B3 organ, piano
- Ivan Neville – Hammond B3 organ
- Paul Shaffer – piano, DX7, Wurlitzer, organ
- Mike Duke – piano, backing vocals
- Kenny Aronoff, Anton Fig, Curt Bisquera – drums
- Styhak Levy, Tom Roady, Debra Dobkin – percussion
- Bill Bergman – tenor saxophone
- Greg Smith – baritone saxophone
- Uptown Horns – horns
- Jim Horn – soprano saxophone, horn arrangements
- John Berry – trumpet
- Melissa Etheridge, Donna McElroy, Vicki Hampton – backing vocals

== Charts ==
Chart (1992)	Peak position
Norwegian Albums (VG-lista)	2
US Billboard 200	118
