= I'm with You (Delbert McClinton album) =

Studio album by Delbert McClinton
- Released: 1990
- Genres: Blues rock, country rock
- Label: Curb
- Producers: Barry Beckett, Delbert McClinton

Delbert McClinton chronology
Live from Austin (1989)	I'm with You (1990)	Best of Delbert McClinton (1991)

I'm with You is an album by the American musician Delbert McClinton, released in 1990. It was his first studio album in nine years.

The album's first single was the title track, which peaked at No. 78 on the Billboard Country Airplay chart.

== Production ==
Recorded live in the studio over two days in Nashville, I'm with You was produced by Barry Beckett and McClinton. It marked the first time that McClinton had helped to produce one of his albums; it was also the first time that he recorded an album while sober.

McClinton cowrote or wrote five of its songs. "Got You on My Mind" is a cover of the Cookie and his Cupcakes song. Anson Funderburgh played guitar on the album; Jim Horn played saxophone.

== Critical reception ==
Professional ratings
Review scores
Source	Rating
AllMusic	2.5/5 stars
Chicago Tribune	3.5/4 stars
The Encyclopedia of Popular Music	3/5 stars
MusicHound Rock: The Essential Album Guide	2.5/5 stars
The Rolling Stone Album Guide	3/5 stars

The Washington Post wrote that "McClinton has always been an exciting singer, but there's a hard-won, undefeated wisdom in his voice now that allows him to sing with the knowingness of his childhood blues heroes." The Los Angeles Times called the album "a fiery, up-tempo collection driven by snappy horn lines and soulful vocals."

The Chicago Tribune thought that McClinton's "soulful, raspy voice is equally at home on flat-out rockers such as 'The Real Thing' and 'That's the Way I Feel' and on his own bluesy ballad, 'I Want to Love You'." Newsday concluded that the album confirms that McClinton "can still do roadhouse rock with the best of them." The Oregonian praised the singer's "gravelly voice," and deemed the album "gutsy, brawling blues and R&B."

AllMusic wrote that "rather than trying to replicate McClinton's late-'70s sound, I'm With You has subtle touches of the newer commercial and polished country of the time mixed with the soul McClinton is known for."

== Track listing ==
1. "That's the Way I Feel"
2. "My Baby's Lovin'"
3. "Go On"
4. "Got You on My Mind"
5. "Crazy 'Bout You"
6. "I'm with You"
7. "I Want to Love You"
8. "Who's Foolin' Who"
9. "The Real Thing"
10. "My Love Is Burnin'"
