= Room to Breathe (Delbert McClinton album) =

Studio album by Delbert McClinton
- Released: August 24, 2002
- Studio: Sound Emporium (Nashville, Tennessee); Bismeaux (Austin, Texas)
- Genre: Americana; blues; blues rock; country; rock
- Length: 42:14
- Label: New West
- Producer: Delbert McClinton; Gary Nicholson

Delbert McClinton chronology
Nothing Personal (2001)	Room to Breathe (2002)	Live (2003)

Professional ratings
Review scores
Source	Rating
AllMusic	2/5 stars
The Austin Chronicle	3/5 stars
Uncut	1.5/5 stars

Room to Breathe is a solo studio album by American blues rock singer-songwriter Delbert McClinton. It was released on August 24, 2002, via New West Records. It was recorded at Sound Emporium at Nashville, Tennessee with additional recording at Bismeaux Studio in Austin, Texas. Production was handled by Gary Nicholson and McClinton himself.

The album peaked at number 84 on the Billboard 200, number 12 on the Top Country Albums, number 3 on the Independent Albums, and topped the Blues Albums chart in the United States.

In 2003, the album was nominated for the Grammy Award for Best Contemporary Blues Album at the 45th Annual Grammy Awards.

== Track listing ==
No.	Title	Writer(s)	Length
1.	"Same Kind of Crazy"	Delbert McClinton; Gary Nicholson	4:04
2.	"Smooth Talk"	McClinton; Nicholson	3:49
3.	"Jungle Room"	McClinton; J. Fred Knobloch	3:41
4.	"Everything I Know About the Blues"	McClinton; Nicholson; Benmont Tench	3:31
5.	"Blues About You Baby"	McClinton; Al Anderson	3:00
6.	"Lone Star Blues"	McClinton; Nicholson	3:57
7.	"The Rub"	McClinton	3:15
8.	"Won't Be Me"	McClinton; Nicholson; Anderson	4:04
9.	"Don't Want to Love You"	McClinton; Billy Lawson	3:00
10.	"Ain't Lost Nothin'"	McClinton; Nicholson; Kim Wilson	2:45
11.	"Money Honey"	McClinton; Nicholson	3:35
12.	"New York City"	McClinton; Tom Faulkner	3:33
Total length:			42:14

== Personnel ==
- Delbert McClinton – vocals, blues harp harmonica (tracks: 1, 7, 10), lead electric guitar (track 3), horn arrangement (tracks: 3, 7, 12), acoustic guitar (track 7), producer
- Todd Sharp – lead electric guitar (tracks: 1, 2, 10), rhythm electric guitar (tracks: 3, 11, 12), acoustic guitar (track 4), backing vocals & electric baritone guitar (track 6), lead acoustic guitar (track 8), nylon-string guitar (track 9)
- Bill Campbell – rhythm electric guitar (tracks: 1, 2, 6, 10), lead electric guitar (tracks: 5, 11, 12)
- Bekka Bramlett – backing vocals (tracks: 2, 3)
- Carl Marsh – strings arrangement & conductor (track 4)
- Glenn Worf – upright bass (track 4)
- Mark Jordan – B-3 electric organ (tracks: 2, 11), piano (tracks: 4, 9)
- The Nashville String Machine – strings (track 4)
- George Hawkins – bass (tracks: 1–3, 5–12), rhythm electric guitar (tracks: 5, 8), backing vocals (track 8)
- Kevin McKendree – B-3 electric organ (tracks: 1, 3, 4, 7, 9, 12), Wurlitzer electric piano (tracks: 1, 2), piano (tracks: 6, 8, 10, 11)
- James Pennebaker – rhythm electric guitar, steel guitar, fiddle & backing vocals (track 6)
- Lynn Williams – drums, backing vocals (track 6), percussion (track 7)
- Gary Nicholson – acoustic guitar & backing vocals (track 6), producer
- John Catchings – cello (track 9)
- Carl Gorodetzky – violin (track 9)
- Pam Sixfin – violin (track 9)
- Jim Grosjean – viola (track 9)
- Jim Horn – baritone saxophone (tracks: 3, 7, 12)
- Jimmy Bowland – tenor saxophone (tracks: 3, 7, 12)
- Don Wise – tenor saxophone (tracks: 7, 12)
- Terry Townson – trumpet & horn arrangement (tracks: 3, 7, 12)
- Bill Huber – trombone (tracks: 3, 7, 12)
- Jimmie Dale Gilmore – backing vocals (track 6)
- Billy Joe Shaver – backing vocals (track 6)
- Jessi Alexander – backing vocals (track 6)
- Emmylou Harris – backing vocals (track 6)
- Rodney Crowell – backing vocals (track 6)
- Butch Hancock – backing vocals (track 6)
- Kimmie Rhodes – backing vocals (track 6)
- Marcia Ball – backing vocals (track 6)
- Steve Earle – backing vocals (track 6)
- Heather Waters – backing vocals (track 6)
- Ray Benson – backing vocals (track 6)
- Guy Clark – backing vocals (track 6)
- Dee Dee Day – backing vocals (track 6)
- Joe Ely – backing vocals (track 6)
- Matt Andrews – recording
- Cris Burns – recording
- Dave Sinko – recording
- Richard Dodd – mixing, mastering
- Wendy Goldstein – executive producer
- Chuck Hermes – design
- Dennis Wile – cover photo
- Katherine Bomboy – photography

== Charts ==
Chart (2002)	Peak position
US Billboard 200	84
US Top Country Albums (Billboard)	12
US Independent Albums (Billboard)	3
US Top Blues Albums (Billboard)	1
