= Rocking the Boat: A Musical Conversation and Journey =

- Directed by: Jay Curlee
- Written by: Jay Curlee
- Cinematography: Kenneth Libby
- Edited by: Keoni Alvarez; Jay Curlee
- Production company: JC Communications
- Distributed by: JC Communications
- Release date: 2007
- Running time: 115 minutes
- Country: United States
- Language: English

Rocking the Boat: A Musical Conversation and Journey is a musical documentary by Hawaii-based film maker Jay Curlee. The feature includes interviews and performances by Delbert McClinton, Marcia Ball, Rodney Crowell, Stephen Bruton, Wayne Toups, Jimmy Hall, Paul Thorn, Jeffrey Steele and Teresa James. Sometime author, musician, sheriff and Texas gubernatorial candidate Kinky Friedman also stars.

The film was the opening night feature of 37th Annual USA Film Festival, April 19, 2007 in Dallas, Texas. It won Best Documentary Feature at the 2007 Woods Hole Film Festival and Best Music Documentary at the 2007 Lone Star International Film Festival. Rocking the Boat also played the 26th Breckenridge Festival of Film and the 2007 Dixie Film Festival.
