= The Secret Sisters (album) =

Studio album by the Secret Sisters
- Released: October 12, 2010
- Recorded: Blackbird Studios
- Genre: Country music Traditional country music
- Length: 30:16
- Label: Beladroit/Universal Republic
- Producer: Dave Cobb; T Bone Burnett

The Secret Sisters chronology
The Secret Sisters (2010)	Put Your Needle Down (2014)

The Secret Sisters is a 2010 album by American country music duo the Secret Sisters. Produced by Dave Cobb and T Bone Burnett, the album consists of ballads, originals, and cover songs such as "Why Don't You Love Me", "Why Baby Why", and the Frank Sinatra song "Somethin' Stupid". The album also includes two originals written by Laura Rogers: "Tennessee Me" and "Waste the Day". Also included is a cover of the 1960s rock song by then-teenage singer Nancy Baron, "I've Got a Feeling", written by Wally Zober and C. Laverne.

== Production ==
The album was recorded in two weeks at Blackbird Studios. Steel guitar player Robbie Turner and pianist Pig Robbins also performed on the album. The album was recorded on analog equipment without computers or digital equipment, the way it would have been done in the 1950s. The production team and the Sisters utilized vintage microphones and classic recording techniques, down to the same type of tape they would have used fifty years ago. Laura Rogers tried to describe the experience by expressing:

"In so many ways we are still the same kids who would perform songs in our parents' room, when we sang about silver threads and golden needles and cold-hearted snakes, and all that. Even with everything that's happened -- getting that dream chance to make our own album, I really believe we've just found where we're supposed to be."

The album was released on October 10, 2010. It peaked at 27 on the Billboard US Country Charts.

== Track listing ==
No.	Title	Writer(s)	Length
1.	"Tennessee Me"	Laura Rogers, Lydia Rogers	2:28
2.	"Why Baby Why"	Darrell Edwards, George Jones	2:29
3.	"The One I Love Is Gone"	Bill Monroe	3:25
4.	"My Heart Skips a Beat"	Buck Owens	2:22
5.	"Somethin' Stupid"	Carson Parks	2:42
6.	"I've Got a Feeling"	Charles LaVerne, Wally Zober	2:25
7.	"Do You Love an Apple"	Traditional	2:44
8.	"All About You"	Traditional	2:58
9.	"Waste the Day"	Laura Rogers, Lydia Rogers	2:35
10.	"Why Don't You Love Me"	Hank Williams	2:19
11.	"House of Gold"	Hank Williams	2:57

== Personnel ==
=== The Secret Sisters ===
- Laura Rogers- vocals
- Lydia Rogers- vocals

=== Additional Musicians ===
- Brian Allen- bass guitar
- Rob Arthur- piano
- Dave Cobb- percussion
- Jason "Rowdy" Cope- acoustic guitar, electric guitar
- Russ Pahl- pedal steel guitar
- Dean Parks- electric guitar
- Chris Powell- drums
- Hargus "Pig" Robbins- piano
- Jackson Smith- acoustic guitar, electric guitar
- Robby Turner- pedal steel guitar

== Reception ==
The album received mostly positive reviews from critics. James Allen called the album "timeless-sounding", while Stephen Rowland of PopMatters gave the album 8 out of 10 stars. Rolling Stone gave the album 4 out of 5 stars and called it "boundless fun". On the other hand, Alexis Petridis of The Guardian criticized some songs on the album for being "unbearably twee".

== Charts ==
Chart (2010)	Peak position
UK Albums Chart	29
US Billboard 200	200
US Top Country Albums (Billboard)	27
US Americana/Folk Albums (Billboard)	8
US Heatseekers Albums (Billboard)	3
