= Saturn Return (The Secret Sisters album) =

Studio album by the Secret Sisters
- Released: February 28, 2020
- Length: 40:27
- Label: New West
- Producer: Brandi Carlile

The Secret Sisters chronology
You Don't Own Me Anymore (2017)	Saturn Return (2020)	Mind, Man, Medicine (2024)

Singles from Saturn Return
- 1. "Cabin" Released: November 15, 2019

Professional ratings
Aggregate scores
Source	Rating
Metacritic	87/100
Review scores
Source	Rating
AllMusic	4.5/5 stars
American Songwriter	4/5 stars
Rolling Stone	4/5 stars

Saturn Return is the fourth studio album by American duo the Secret Sisters. It was released on February 28, 2020, under New West Records. It received a nomination for the Grammy Award for Best Folk Album.

== Commercial performance ==
As of March 9, 2020, the album has sold 2,200 copies in the United States.

== Critical reception ==
Saturn Return was met with universal acclaim reviews from critics. At Metacritic, which assigns a weighted average rating out of 100 to reviews from mainstream publications, this release received an average score of 87, based on 5 reviews.

== Track listing ==
All tracks are written by Laura Rogers and Lydia Rogers.

No.	Title	Length
1.	"Silver"	3:53
2.	"Late Bloomer"	4:20
3.	"Cabin"	3:46
4.	"Hand Over My Heart"	4:17
5.	"Fair"	3:24
6.	"Tin Can Angel"	4:26
7.	"Nowhere, Baby"	4:39
8.	"Hold You Dear"	3:51
9.	"Water Witch" (featuring Brandi Carlile)	3:27
10.	"Healer in the Sky"	4:24

== Charts ==
Chart performance for Saturn Return
Chart	Peak position
US Heatseekers Albums (Billboard)	25
