= Put Your Needle Down =

Studio album by the Secret Sisters
- Released: April 14, 2014
- Genre: Country music Traditional country music
- Length: 43:42
- Label: Republic
- Producer: T-Bone Burnett

The Secret Sisters chronology
The Secret Sisters (2010)	Put Your Needle Down (2014)	You Don't Own Me Anymore (2017)

Professional ratings
Aggregate scores
Source	Rating
Metacritic	81/100
Review scores
Source	Rating
AllMusic	4/5 stars
PopMatters	7/10 stars
American Songwriter	3.5/5 stars
The Observer	3/5 stars

Put Your Needle Down is the second studio album by American duo the Secret Sisters. It was released on April 14, 2014 under Universal Republic Records.

== Critical reception ==
Steve Leggett of AllMusic writes, "This set might not be as insularly perfect as the Secret Sisters' first album, but it's ultimately just as impressive, if not more so"

Jim Beviglia of American Songwriter gives the album 3½ out of a possible 5 stars and writes, "Their second full-length, Put Your Needle Down, keeps the focus on their mesmerizing harmonies but still demonstrates intriguing artistic progression."

Scott Recker reviews the album for PopMatters and gives it 7 out of a possible 10 stars. He begins his review by saying, "If the 2010 self-titled debut from the Secret Sisters proved that siblings Laura and Lydia Rogers could find success with something traditional, its follow-up, Put Your Needle Down, shows that they aren't going to stay in anyone else’s shadow."

Beville Dunkerley announces the release of the Deluxe edition through Cracker Barrel stores at Rolling Stone magazine and writes, "Produced by T Bone Burnett, the album has those same throwback harmonies that put the Secret Sisters on the music map with their 2010 debut, but with more contemporary melodies on several of the tracks this time around."

== Track listing ==
No.	Title	Writer(s)	Length
1.	"Rattle My Bones"	Brandi Carlile, Phil Hanseroth, Tim Hanseroth	3:40
2.	"Iuka"	Laura Rogers, Lydia Rogers, Dan Wilson	4:42
3.	"Dirty Lie"	Bob Dylan (additional lyrics by Laura Rogers and Lydia Rogers)	2:54
4.	"The Pocket Knife"	Polly Jean Harvey	4:34
5.	"Let There Be Lonely"	Laura Rogers, Lydia Rogers, Gordie Sampson	3:10
6.	"Black And Blue"	Brandi Carlile, Laura Rogers, Lydia Rogers	3:30
7.	"Lonely Island"	Boudleaux Bryant	2:32
8.	"I Cannot Find A Way"	Laura Rogers, Lydia Rogers	3:12
9.	"If I Don't"	Laura Rogers, Lydia Rogers	3:53
10.	"Good Luck, Good Night, Goodbye"	Angelo Petraglia, Laura Rogers, Lydia Rogers	3:34
11.	"Bad Habit"	Brandi Carlile, Laura Rogers, Lydia Rogers	4:44
12.	"River Jordan"	Laura Rogers, Lydia Rogers	3:17
Total length:			43:42

Deluxe edition
No.	Title	Writer(s)	Length
13.	"You’ve Got It Wrong"	Laura Rogers, Lydia Rogers	4:02
14.	"Next Sunday"	Laura Rogers, Lydia Rogers	3:30
Total length:			51:14

== Personnel ==
=== The Secret Sisters ===
- Laura Rogers- vocals
- Lydia Rogers- vocals, acoustic guitar

=== Additional musicians ===
- Jack Ashford - tambourine, wood block
- Jay Bellerose - drums
- T Bone Burnett - acoustic guitar, electric guitar
- Keefus Ciancia - keyboards, piano
- Zach Dawes - bass guitar
- Woody Jackson - electric guitar
- Gurf Morlix - electric guitar
- Marc Ribot - banjo, resonator guitar, slide guitar
- Martin Tillmann- cello
- Casey Waits- drums
- Darren Weiss- drums
- Gabe Witcher- upright bass, fiddle, string arrangements, strings

== Chart positions ==
Chart (2014)	Peak position
UK Country Albums (OCC)	13
US Billboard 200	110
US Top Country Albums (Billboard)	18
US Folk Albums (Billboard)	3
US Heatseekers Albums (Billboard)	1
