= The Ben Miller Band =

US musical group

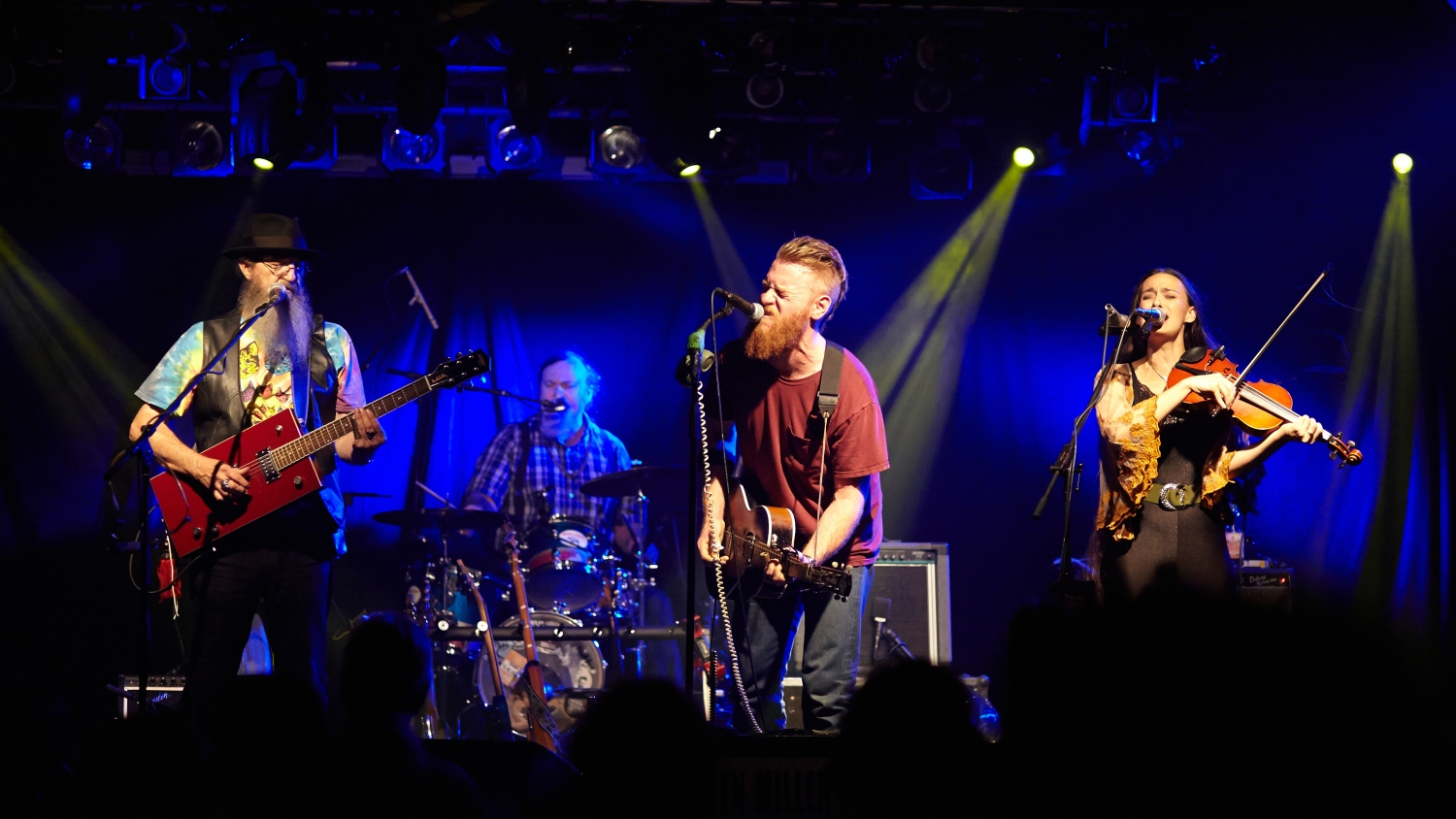
- The Ben Miller Band live in Germany 2016

Background information
- Origin: Joplin, Missouri, United States
- Genres: Folk; Blues; Bluegrass
- Years active: 2005–present
- Label: New West
- Members: Ben Miller; Scott Leeper; Smilin Bob Lewis; Rachel Ammons
- Past members: Doug Dicharry (2005–2016)
- Website: benmillerband.com

The Ben Miller Band is an American band that was formed in 2005 in Joplin, Missouri. The band's lineup currently consists of lead vocalist and guitarist Ben Miller; bassist (playing a homemade one-string washtub bass), drummer, and back-up vocalist Scott Leeper; lead/back-up vocalist, violinist/cellist, guitarist, and electric-cactus player Rachel Ammons; and guitarist/bassist/percussionist Bob Lewis. The Ben Miller Band combines elements of folk, blues, bluegrass and country into their music. Originally, The Ben Miller Band's sound had been self-described by the band as "Ozark Stomp" but in reference to their label, is now referred to as "Mudstomp".

== History ==
In 2010, The Ben Miller Band released a pair of albums. 1 Ton was released on June 10, 2010, with 2 Ton released shortly after on August 5, 2010. On May 22, 2011, their home town of Joplin, Missouri was devastated by a tornado. In response to the tragedy, the band established a charity to help restore the community. They also released a benefit album titled Record for Joplin. The release of this charity album was followed shortly after by another release titled Heavy Load in 2012.

The Ben Miller band won a slot as the opener for ZZ Top in 2013. Their performances with ZZ Top garnered praise and attention from reviewers. They were signed to New West Records later in that year. In 2014 the band found themselves in the studio recording with Vance Powell and subsequently released the album Any Way, Shape or Form.

Original member Doug Dicharry (percussionist/trombone) left the band at the end of 2015. Soon after, Rachel Ammons and Bob Lewis were asked to join the band. Since then, the band has continued touring North America and Europe. Their latest album, titled Choke Cherry Tree, was released on January 26, 2018, on New West Records.

In 2017 the band created a new album and played on the TV series Outsiders.

== Discography ==
=== Albums ===
- 1 Ton (2010)
- 2 Ton (2010)
- Heavy Load (2012)
- Any Way, Shape or Form (2014)
- Outsiders (Music from the Television Series) (2017)
- Choke Cherry Tree (2018)

=== EPs ===
- Record for Joplin (2011)
