= 49 Winchester =

American country music band

- Origin: Castlewood, Virginia
- Genres: Country rock, Alternative country, Americana, Southern rock
- Years active: 2013–present
- Label: New West Records
- Members: Isaac Gibson; Bus Shelton; Chase Chafin; Noah Patrick; Tim Hall; Justin Louthian
- Website: 49winchester.com

49 Winchester are an American country rock band consisting of Isaac Gibson, Bus Shelton, Chase Chafin, Noah Patrick, Tim Hall, and Justin Louthian. Formed in Castlewood, Virginia in 2013, the band has released five studio albums, toured internationally, and supported artists including Turnpike Troubadours, Whiskey Myers, Corb Lund, Tyler Childers, and Luke Combs. They are signed to New West Records.

== Career ==
The band's name comes from a street in Castlewood, Virginia just north of the TRI Cities and Bristol, TN/VA just up the road from Dungannon, VA. The band first met in Castlewood and began playing music. They were formed by Gibson, Chafin, and Shelton who were high school best friends, and began touring the local area in Virginia not long after they graduated alongside additional members Patrick, Hall, and Louthian. From 2014 to 2020, they recorded and self-released three studio albums, 49 Winchester (2014), The Wind (2018), and III (2020) while continuing to build a fanbase through performing live.

The band signed to New West Records some time after the release of III and, on February 18, 2022, they announced their fourth album and their first with the label, Fortune Favors the Bold, paired with the release of lead single "Annabel". In a statement about the project, Gibson said, “Signing with New West Records is something we’re really proud of. They're an artist-centered label who gave us total creative freedom to make a record that is authentically us, and I speak for all the guys in the band when I say we are super excited about this being a New West release. I don't think any other label could fit us so perfectly. We are looking forward to getting this record out and playing it on the road this summer!” Fortune Favors the Bold was released on May 13, 2022.

On April 9, 2024, the band announced their fifth album, Leavin' This Holler, alongside the release of a lead single, "Yearnin' For You". The project was produced by the band and Stewart Myers and was released on August 2, 2024. They embarked on a tour to support the album. They released "Miles To Go" on December 13, 2024 after it was featured in the series Yellowstone on Paramount Network.

== Members ==
- Isaac Gibson - vocals/guitar
- Bus Shelton - guitar
- Chase Chafin - bass
- Noah Patrick - pedal steel
- Tim Hall - piano/organ/keys
- Justin Louthian - drums

== Influences ==
Sonically, the band draws inspiration from country music performers Hank Williams, Johnny Cash, Merle Haggard, Waylon Jennings, and George Jones. Gibson has cited rock, punk, and metal artists as being a core influence on their music and live shows, specifically citing Zakk Wylde, Jim Root, Willie Adler from Lamb of God, and Pantera. Rolling Stone likened their music to that of Chris Stapleton and Drive-By Truckers.

Regarding their sound, frontman Isaac Gibson explained that he doesn't believe that the band needs to be attached to any particular genre, stating, "we're really not a country band, we're really not a rock band, and we're really not a Southern rock band. I think that that is the one defining factor, the fact that we are from where we're from". Additionally, he expressed his hope that the band could be considered "torchbearers" for Appalachian music and that he wants bands to think of 49 Winchester as an Appalachian band primarily.

== Discography ==
=== Studio albums ===
Title	Album details
49 Winchester	Released: April 25, 2014; Label: Self-released; Format: CD, streaming, digital download
The Wind	Released: May 26, 2018; Label: Self-released; Format: CD, streaming, digital download
III	Released: October 2, 2020; Label: Self-released; Format: CD, streaming, digital download
Fortune Favors the Bold	Released: May 13, 2022; Label: New West; Format: CD, streaming, digital download, vinyl
Leavin' This Holler	Released: August 2, 2024; Label: New West; Format: CD, streaming, digital download, vinyl
Change of Plans	Released: May 15, 2026; Label: New West; Format: CD, streaming, digital download, vinyl, cassette

=== Singles ===
Year	Song	Album
2022	"Annabel"	Fortune Favors the Bold
2022	"Russell County Line"	Fortune Favors the Bold
2022	"Damn Darlin'"	Fortune Favors the Bold
2022	"All I Need"	Fortune Favors the Bold
2024	"Yearnin' For You"	Leavin' This Holler
2024	"Fast Asleep"	Leavin' This Holler
2024	"Tulsa"	Leavin' This Holler
2024	"Make It Count" / "Hillbilly Happy"	Leavin' This Holler
2024	"Miles To Go"	Non-album single
2025	"Changes"	Change Of Plans

== Awards and nominations ==
Year	Association	Category	Nominated work	Result	Ref.
2023	Americana Music Honors & Awards	Duo/Group of the Year	Themselves	Nominated	
2026	Academy of Country Music Awards	Group of the Year	Themselves	Pending	
