= Tall, Dark, and Handsome (album) =

Tall, Dark, & Handsome

Studio album by Delbert McClinton and Self-Made Men + Dana
- Released: July 26, 2019
- Studio: The Rock House (Franklin, TN)
- Genre: Blues
- Length: 40:00
- Label: Hot Shot
- Producer: Bob Britt; Delbert McClinton; Kevin McKendree

Delbert McClinton chronology
Prick of the Litter (2017)	Tall, Dark, & Handsome (2019)	Outdated Emotion (2022)

Tall, Dark, & Handsome is a studio album by American blues musician Delbert McClinton and his second album with Self-Made Men. It was released on July 26, 2019, through Hot Shot Records with distribution via Thirty Tigers/The Orchard. The recording sessions took place at The Rock House in Franklin, Tennessee. It was produced by Bob Britt, Kevin McKendree, and McClinton. It features saxophone player Dana Robbins, who contributed to three of the fourteen tracks on the album and also credited on the album's cover.

The album peaked at number 62 on the Billboard Top Album Sales, number 51 on the Top Current Album Sales, number 15 on the Independent Albums, and topped the Blues Albums chart in the United States.

At the 62nd Annual Grammy Awards, the album won a Grammy Award for Best Traditional Blues Album.

== Critical reception ==
Professional ratings
Aggregate scores
Source	Rating
Metacritic	79/100
Review scores
Source	Rating
All About Jazz	4/5 stars
AllMusic	3.5/5 stars
American Songwriter	3.5/5 stars
The Austin Chronicle	4/5 stars

Tall, Dark, & Handsome was met with generally favorable reviews from music critics. At Metacritic, which assigns a normalized rating out of 100 to reviews from mainstream publications, the album received an average score of 79, based on five reviews.

Reid Jowers of The Austin Chronicle wrote: "picking up both pace and vigor after Prick of the Litter, McClinton finds a Second Wind going all the way back to 1978, his voice still ragged but right and, here, full of piss and vinegar". AllMusic's Stephen Thomas Erlewine stated: "where Prick of the Litter settled into a mellow vibe, Tall, Dark, And Handsome is bold and restless, finding McClinton trying on all manner of blues for size". Hal Horowitz of American Songwriter wrote: "in other words, it's McClinton as we've come to know and love him, cranking out another solid disc of Americana, Delbert-style. It sounds inspired and freewheeling, like he's just getting started. And considering his age and extensive resume, that's quite a compliment".

== Track listing ==
No.	Title	Writer(s)	Length
1.	"Mr. Smith"	Delbert McClinton; Bob Britt; Kevin McKendree	4:03
2.	"If I Hock My Guitar"	McClinton; Britt; Michael G. Joyce	2:07
3.	"No Chicken on the Bone"	McClinton; Britt; Dennis Wage	3:07
4.	"Let's Get Down Like We Used To"	McClinton; Pat McLaughlin; Al Anderson	3:03
5.	"Gone to Mexico"	McClinton	2:16
6.	"Lulu"	McClinton; Britt; McKendree	3:04
7.	"Loud Mouth"	McClinton; Britt; Joyce	3:06
8.	"Down in the Mouth"	McClinton	2:07
9.	"Ruby & Jules"	McClinton; Britt; Wage	3:00
10.	"Any Other Way"	McClinton; Britt; McKendree	3:22
11.	"A Fool Like Me"	McClinton	3:06
12.	"Can't Get Up"	McClinton; Britt; Joyce	2:35
13.	"Temporarily Insane"	McClinton; Britt; Joyce	4:04
14.	"A Poem"	McClinton; Britt; McKendree	1:00
Total length:			40:00

== Personnel ==
Delbert McClinton and Self-Made Men + Dana

- Delbert McClinton – vocals, producer
- Bob Britt – guitar (tracks: 1, 2, 5–14), acoustic guitar & mandolin (track 3), slide guitar (track 4), backing vocals (track 6), producer, engineering, mixing
- Kevin McKendree – piano (tracks: 1–3, 5–8, 10–12, 14), Hammond B-3 organ (tracks: 1, 4, 7, 11, 12), backing vocals (track 6), guitar (track 7), mellotron (track 13), producer, engineering, mixing
- Quentin Ware – trumpet (tracks: 1, 11)
- Dennis Wage – Wurlitzer electric organ (track 4), piano (track 9)
- Michael G. "Mike" Joyce – bass (tracks: 4, 9)
- Jack Bruno – drums (tracks: 4, 9)
- James Pennebaker – guitar (track 8)
- Dana Robbins – tenor saxophone (track 1), saxophone (tracks: 5, 10)

Additional musicians

- Wendy Moten – backing vocals (tracks: 1, 3, 4, 6, 8, 9)
- Vicki Hampton – backing vocals (tracks: 1, 3, 4, 6, 8, 9)
- Robert Bailey – backing vocals (tracks: 1, 3, 4, 6, 8)
- Delaney McClinton – backing vocals (tracks: 2, 11)
- Glenn Worf – bass (tracks: 1–3, 5–8, 10–13)
- Joe Maher – drums (tracks: 1–3, 5–8, 10–13), percussion (track 5)
- Jim Hoke – baritone saxophone (tracks: 1, 2, 11), tenor saxophone (track 2), clarinet (tracks: 4, 11), accordion & saxophone (track 5)
- Roy Agee – trombone (track 1), tromba marina (track 11)
- Stuart Duncan – violin (track 3)
- Patrick James "Pat" Mclaughlin – backing vocals (tracks: 4, 13), guitar (track 4)
- Yates McKendree – guitar (track 7), engineering
- Jim DeMain – mastering
- Fetzer Design – art direction, design, photography

== Charts ==
Chart (2019)	Peak position
US Top Album Sales (Billboard)	62
US Independent Albums (Billboard)	15
US Top Blues Albums (Billboard)	1
