= Don Wise =

American songwriter (1942–2024)

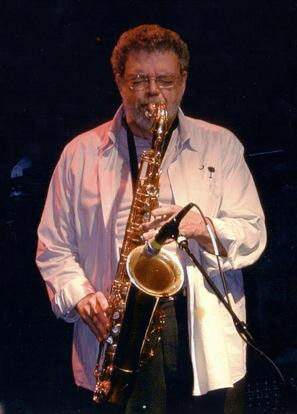
- Wise performing in 2005

Background information
- Born: Donald Grover Wise; March 24, 1942; Westerly, Rhode Island, U.S.
- Died: March 1, 2024 (aged 81) Knoxville, Tennessee, U.S.
- Genres: Rhythm and blues, swing, country, rock 'n' roll
- Occupations: Musician, music producer, songwriter
- Instruments: Tenor saxophone, alto saxophone, vocals
- Years active: 1957–2008
- Label: Horn O' Copia Recordings
- Website: donwise.com

Donald Grover Wise (March 24, 1942 – March 1, 2024) was an American tenor saxophonist, songwriter, and music producer. He gained attention as reliable sideman of the singer-songwriter Delbert McClinton from Lubbock, Texas, for 23 years. Wise played with many artists and in venues all over the globe in his more than 50-year musical career. He released four CDs under his own name before retiring from the music business in 2008.

Wise was married and lived with his family in Knoxville, Tennessee. He died on March 1, 2024, at the age of 81.

== Development and musical career ==
Wise began playing music on a clarinet. At age 12 he moved to the saxophone, initially alto sax and a year later settled on the tenor sax. He was inspired by the rhythm and blues of the 1950s; however, he also played country, swing, and big band music. He joined his first band in 1957. Riding the tide of rock 'n' roll, they called themselves the Rhythm Rockers. Early saxophone influences were Red Prysock, Sam "The Man" Taylor, Earl Bostic, David "Fathead" Newman, and a little later, King Curtis, Sam Butera, and Junior Walker. With these musical inspirations, over the years he developed his versatility and his own signature sound and became a sought-after session musician.

Wise toured with various bands across the U.S. in the 1970s and 1980s and has performed with Jeffrey Osborne, Ruben Ramos, Chuck Jackson, Maxine Brown, Taj Mahal, Willie Nelson, Marcia Ball, Rickey Godfrey, Jimmie Dale Gilmore, Tower of Power, Huey Lewis, Hal Ketchum, Teresa James and Joe Ely. A milestone was the invitation from Ray Charles to back him on a nationally broadcast TV appearance for the ESPYs in New York City in 1997. Wise was also member of the "Allstar Band" performing the Inaugural-Concert for George H. W. Bush in 1989.

While recording in 1985 with Radio Zebra, a Texas rock group with whom he had toured Germany a month prior, he received a call from Delbert McClinton to fill the position as saxophonist in his band. Wise took the opportunity and remained a pillar of the group for 23 years. He served as instrumentalist and co-producer of McClinton's Grammy-nominated album Live from Austin in 1989 and as musician of Grammy winner Cost of Living in 2005. After more tours in Central Europe and Scandinavia, a large fan base grew outside the U.S. and led to Wise's increased recognition and the popularity of his music.

His eclectic skills brought various honors, from Country Sax Player of the Year at the Oklahoma Country Music Awards in 1980, to 2002 when he earned the Best Instrumentalist Cammy Award from the Beach Music Association. His playing style is written about in John Laughter's Contemporary Saxophone, with four of his solos from the Live from Austin CD featured on the book's companion disc. Reviewers in a variety of journals, magazines, and e-zines describe his soulful solos and just-right backup playing.

In 1997 he produced the first CD of his own, which garnered excellent reviews and led to three more discs over the next eight years. Colleagues including Delbert McClinton, Marcia Ball, Gary Bunton, Britt Johansen, Robin Griffin, Bugs Henderson, Big Joe Maher, Teresa James and Steve Williams helped get his ideas heard and appreciated. Friend and co-producer, Wally Moyers, owner of Studio 84 in Lubbock, was invaluable in achieving the sound Wise wanted. Besides featuring his friends' and colleagues' talents, Wise complemented these projects with his own musicianship as a sax pro, as well as his gifts as a composer, lyricist, producer, and singer.

In 2008, after an acclaimed tour of Finland and Norway, Wise exited the Delbert McClinton band to devote his time to his family and hobbies. Sometimes he still played as a guest with various artists, such as Mingo Fishtrap from Austin, Texas, or on Delbert McClinton's annual Sandy Beaches Cruise. In 2021 Wise was inducted into the Westerly High Music Hall of Fame.

== Instruments ==
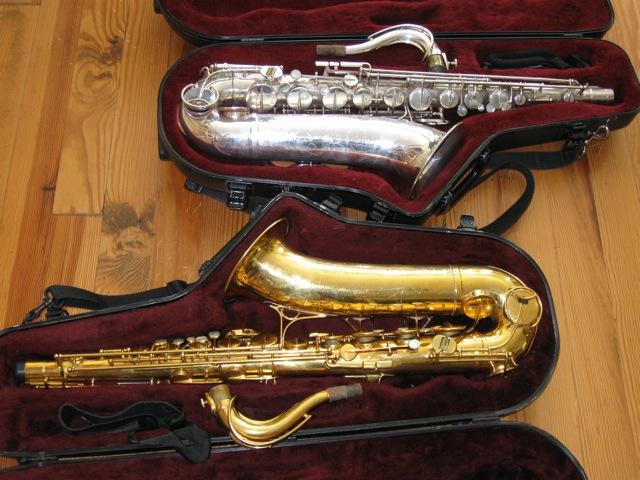
Wise's "The Martin Tenor" saxophones

Wise played "The Martin Tenor" built in 1951 with the Otto Link 7S, metal mouthpiece (adapted By "Doc" Tenney in Cedar Falls, Iowa). In addition, he had a Martin silver tenor saxophone (which he acquired in trade for a black Keilwerth tenor with golden flaps), a Martin alto, and a Conn soprano sax.

== Awards ==
- Country Saxophonist of the Year, 1980, Oklahoma Country Music Association
- Cammy Award – Best Instrumentalist, 2002, Beach Music Association
- Induction into the Westerly High Music Hall of Fame, 2021

== Discography ==
Excerpt of productions, Wise has contributed as a saxophonist, producer, composer and/or songwriter:

=== Solo-CDs ===
All released by Horn O' Copia Recordings.

- 1997 In Wise Hands
- 2000 In the Verge of Survival
- 2002 Genuine Snake
- 2005 Swingin' Up a Storm

=== As sideman, session or guest musician ===
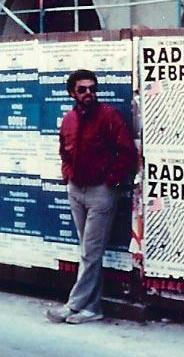
Don Wise, Germany 1984

- 1981 Warhorse Band: Live in Lubbock
- 1985 Radio Zebra: Different stripes for different types
- 1988 Bugs Henderson & The Shuffle Kings: American Music
- 1989 Delbert McClinton: Live from Austin
- 1990 Genuine Houserockin' Music, Vol. 4
- 1991 The Best of Mountain Stage Live, Vol. 2
- 1992 Hot Rhythm & Cool Blues – Texas Style
- 1993 Bugs Henderson: Years in the jungle
- 1997 Delbert McClinton: One of the Fortunate Few
- 1998 Big Blues Extravaganza!: The Best of Austin City Limits
- 1998 Bugs Henderson & The Shuffle Kings: Have Blues...Must Rock
- 2000 Kevin McKendree: Miss Laura's Kitchen
- 2001 All Aboard: The Beach Boogie Train, Vol. 3
- 2001 The Delta Riders: Kickin' up Dust
- 2002 Delbert McClinton: Room to Breathe
- 2002 Todd Sharp: Walking All the Way
- 2003 Johnny Flash & The Rockets: I Hear My Baby Knocking
- 2003 Paul Craver: Let the Music Play
- 2003 Delbert McClinton: Live
- 2003 Bugs Henderson & The Shuffle Kings: We're a Texas Band – Live in Germany
- 2005 Delbert McClinton: Cost of living
- 2005 Teresa James: Rhythm Method
- 2008 Rob Roy Parnell: Let's Start Something
- 2010 Rickey Godfrey: Nasty Man
- 2012 Topcat Records 20th Anniversary Extravaganza
