= Delbert McClinton =

American singer-songwriter (born 1940)

- Born: November 4, 1940 (age 85); Lubbock, Texas, U.S.
- Origin: Fort Worth, Texas, U.S.
- Genres: Blues rock, electric blues, country
- Occupations: Singer-songwriter, musician
- Instruments: Vocals, guitar, piano, harmonica
- Years active: 1962–present
- Labels: LeCam, Soft, Bobill, Brownfield, Smash, Clean, Paramount, ABC, Mercury, Capitol, MCA, Alligator, Curb, Intermedia, Polygram, Rising Tide, New West, Direct Source
- Website: delbert.com

Delbert McClinton (born November 4, 1940) is an American singer-songwriter, guitarist, harmonica player, and pianist.

From his first professional stage appearance in 1957 to his most recent national tour in 2018, he has recorded albums for several major record labels and singles that have reached the U.S. Billboard Hot 100, Mainstream Rock Tracks, and Hot Country Songs charts. His highest-charting single was "Tell Me About It", a 1992 duet with Tanya Tucker, which reached number four on the country chart. Four of his albums have been number one on the blues chart, and another reached number two. His highest-charting pop hit was 1980's "Giving It Up for Your Love", which peaked at number eight on the Hot 100.

McClinton has earned four Grammy Awards - 1992 Rock Performance by a Duo with Bonnie Raitt for "Good Man, Good Woman", 2002 Contemporary Blues Album for Nothing Personal, 2006 Best Contemporary Blues Album for Cost of Living, and 2020 Best Traditional Blues Album for Tall, Dark, & Handsome. He has been nominated for eight Grammy Awards as of 2020.

He was inducted into the Texas Heritage Songwriters Hall of Fame in March 2011, along with Lee Roy Parnell, Bruce Channel, Gary Nicholson, and Cindy Walker. In 2019, Delbert McClinton was honored by the historic Paramount Theatre in Austin, Texas, with the fifth star in their Walk of Fame. (Others are actors Jaston Williams and Joe Sears, and musical artists Jerry Jeff Walker and Lyle Lovett).

== Career ==
=== Early years ===
McClinton was born in Lubbock, Texas, and moved with his family to Fort Worth when he was 11 years old. He worked in a bar band, the Straitjackets, who backed Sonny Boy Williamson II, Howlin' Wolf, Lightnin' Hopkins, and Jimmy Reed. McClinton recorded several regional singles before hitting the national chart in 1962, playing harmonica on Bruce Channel's "Hey! Baby". On a tour with Channel in the United Kingdom, McClinton instructed John Lennon on the finer points of blues harmonica playing.

McClinton formed the Ron-Dels, sometimes called the Rondells, with Ronnie Kelly and Billy Wade Sanders. The band had a chart single in 1965 with "If You Really Want Me to I'll Go".

=== 1970s ===
Relocating to Los Angeles in 1972, McClinton partnered with fellow Texan Glen Clark to perform a combination of country and soul music. They released two albums before splitting, and McClinton embarked on a solo career.

Emmylou Harris had a number-one hit in 1978 with her recording of McClinton's composition "Two More Bottles of Wine", and a cover version of his "B Movie Boxcar Blues" was on the first album by the Blues Brothers, Briefcase Full of Blues.

=== 1980s and 1990s ===
McClinton's 1980 album, The Jealous Kind, contained his only Top 40 hit single, "Giving It Up for Your Love", which peaked at number eight on the Billboard Hot 100 and number 35 on Adult Contemporary. He was inactive in the studio during much of the 1980s, though he toured heavily. McClinton closed the decade with the Grammy-nominated 1989 album Live from Austin, recorded during an appearance on the television program Austin City Limits and co-produced by saxophonist sideman Don Wise, who went on to become a longtime fixture in the band.

In 1991, McClinton won a Grammy Award for a duet with Bonnie Raitt, "Good Man, Good Woman", and reached the Top 5 of the country chart with "Tell Me About It", a duet with Tanya Tucker. He re-entered the Billboard charts in 1992 with the album Never Been Rocked Enough, which included the charting single "Every Time I Roll the Dice" and a cover of John Hiatt's "Have a Little Faith in Me".

McClinton recorded the song "Weatherman", which was played with the opening titles and closing credits of the 1993 film Groundhog Day, starring Bill Murray. The fledgling label Rising Tide Records released One of the Fortunate Few in 1997, before the label went out of business.

=== 2000–present ===
McClinton released two studio albums in the early 2000s for New West Records, which also issued Delbert McClinton Live in 2003, a compilation album of songs from his career. In 2006, he won a Grammy Award for his album Cost of Living in the category Best Contemporary Blues Album.

Etta James included two McClinton songs on her 2003 album, Let's Roll.

McClinton was a judge for the fourth annual Independent Music Awards, presented to independent artists to support their careers. He is featured in the documentary film Rocking the Boat: A Musical Conversation and Journey, by the filmmaker Jay Curlee.

McClinton performed on the Frankie Miller album Double Take, released in 2016; his voice is merged with Miller's in the song "Beginner at the Blues". His 2019 recording, Tall, Dark and Handsome, was chosen as a Favorite Blues Album by AllMusic. It was awarded the 2020 Grammy Award for Best Traditional Blues Album.

== Discography ==
=== Studio albums ===
Year	Album	Chart Positions				Label
Year	Album	US Blues	US Country	US	US Indie	Label
1972	Delbert & Glen					Clean/Atlantic
1973	Subject to Change (Delbert & Glen)					Clean/Atlantic
1975	Victim of Life's Circumstances					ABC
1976	Genuine Cowhide					ABC
1977	Love Rustler		49			ABC
1978	Second Wind					Capricorn
1979	Keeper of the Flame			146		Capricorn
1980	The Jealous Kind			34		Capitol
1981	Plain' from the Heart			181		Capitol
1987	Honky Tonkin'					MCA
1989	Honky Tonkin' (I Guess I Done Me Some)					Alligator
1989	Live from Austin					Alligator
1990	I'm with You					Curb
1992	Never Been Rocked Enough			118		Curb
1993	Feelin' Alright					Intermedia
1993	Delbert McClinton					Curb
1994	Shot from the Saddle					Mercury
1994	Honky Tonk 'n' Blues					MCA
1995	Let the Good Times Roll					MCA
1997	One of the Fortunate Few	2	15	116		Rising Tide
2001	Nothing Personal	1	20	103	3	New West
2002	Room to Breathe	1	12	84	3	New West
2003	Live (at the Bergen Musicfest)		44		31	New West
2005	Cost of Living	1	14	105	16	New West
2006	Live from Austin, TX					New West
2007	Rockin' Blues					Direct Source
2009	Acquired Taste	1		131	23	New West
2013	Blind, Crippled and Crazy (Delbert & Glen)	1		172	36	New West
2017	Prick of the Litter	2			18	Hot Shot
2019	Tall, Dark & Handsome	1			15	Hot Shot
2022	Outdated Emotion					Hot Shot

=== Compilation albums ===
Year	Album	Label
1978	Very Early Delbert McClinton, Vol. 1	LeCam
1978	Very Early Delbert McClinton, Vol. 2	LeCam
1989	Best of Delbert McClinton	Curb
1994	Classics Volume One (The Jealous Kind) reissue of 1980 album	Curb
1994	Classics Volume Two (Plain' from the Heart) reissue of 1981 album	Curb
1995	The Great Songs – Come Together	Curb
1999	The Crazy Cajun Recordings	Edsel
1999	Ultimate Collection	Hip-O
2000	Don't Let Go: The Collection	Music Club
2000	Genuine Rhythm & the Blues	Hip-O
2003	The Best of Delbert McClinton: 20th Century Masters/The Millennium Collection	MCA Nashville
2006	The Definitive Collection	Hip-O

=== Singles ===
Year	Single	Chart Positions						Album
Year	Single	US	US AC	US Country	US MSR	CAN	CAN Country	Album
1965	"If You Really Want Me To, I'll Go" (the Ron-Dels)	97	—	—	—	—		Very Early Delbert McClinton, Vol. 1
1972	"I Received a Letter" (Delbert & Glen)	90	—	—	—	—	—	Delbert & Glen
1980	"Giving It Up for Your Love"	8	35	—	—	10	—	The Jealous Kind
1981	"Shotgun Rider"	70	—	—	—	—	—	The Jealous Kind
1981	"Sandy Beaches"	101	—	—	—	—	—	Plain' from the Heart
1990	"I'm with You"	—	—	78	—	—	—	I'm with You
1992	"Every Time I Roll the Dice"	—	—	—	13	40	—	Never Been Rocked Enough
1995	"Come Together"	—	—	—	—	—	—	Come Together: America Salutes the Beatles
1997	"Sending Me Angels"	—	—	65	—	—	92	One of the Fortunate Few
2001	"When Rita Leaves"	—	—	—	—	—	—	Nothing Personal
2002	"Same Kind of Crazy"	—	—	—	—	—	—	Room to Breathe
2002	"Lone Star Blues"	—	—	—	—	—	—	Room to Breathe
2005	"One of the Fortunate Few"	—	—	—	—	—	—	Cost of Living
2005	"I Had a Real Good Time"	—	—	—	—	—	—	Cost of Living
2006	"Midnight Communion"	—	—	—	—	—	—	Cost of Living
2009	"Mama's Little Baby"	—	—	—	—	—	—	Acquired Taste
2009	"Starting a Rumor"	—	—	—	—	—	—	Acquired Taste

=== Guest singles ===
Year	Single	Artist	Chart Positions		Album
Year	Single	Artist	US Country	CAN Country	Album
1993	"Tell Me About It"	Tanya Tucker	4	3	Can't Run from Yourself

=== Music videos ===
Year	Video
1990	"I'm with You"
1990	"Who's Foolin' Who"
1992	"Everytime I Roll The Dice"
1995	"Come Together"
1997	"Sending Me Angels"
2002	"Lone Star Blues"

== Grammy awards and nominations ==
Year	Nominee / work	Award	Result	Ref.
2020	Tall, Dark, & Handsome	Grammy Award for Best Traditional Blues Album	Won	
2006	"Midnight Communion"	Grammy Award for Best Male Country Vocal Performance	Nominated	
2006	Cost Of Living	Grammy Award for Best Contemporary Blues Album	Won	
2003	Room To Breathe	Grammy Award for Best Contemporary Blues Album	Nominated	
2002	Nothing Personal	Grammy Award for Best Contemporary Blues Album	Won	
1993	"Tell Me About It"	Grammy Award for Best Country Vocal Collaboration	Nominated	
1992	"Good Man, Good Woman"	Grammy Award for Best Rock Performance by a Duo or Group with Vocal	Won	
1990	Live From Austin	Grammy Award for Best Contemporary Blues Recording	Nominated	
