= The Secret Sisters =

American singing duo

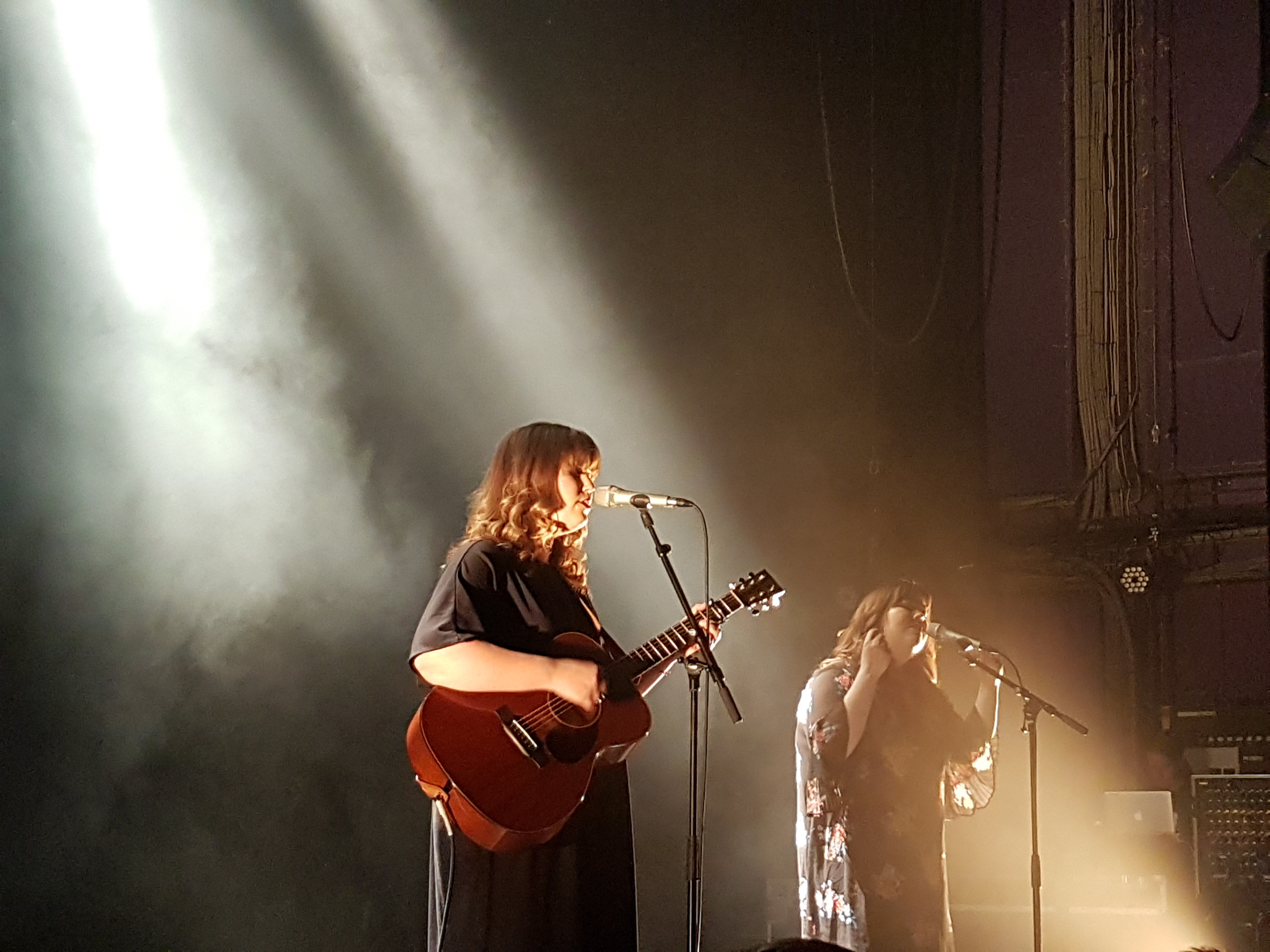
- The Secret Sisters performing at the Heartland Festival in the Netherlands in 2018

Background information
- Origin: Muscle Shoals, Alabama, U.S.
- Genres: Americana; folk; country
- Years active: 2009–present
- Labels: Republic, New West
- Members: Laura Rogers; Lydia Slagle
- Website: www.secretsisterband.com

The Secret Sisters is an Americana singing and songwriting duo consisting of vocalists Laura Rogers and Lydia Slagle (née Rogers). The duo's music has been compared to artists like the Everly Brothers.

== History ==
=== Beginnings ===
Laura and Lydia Rogers are sisters from Muscle Shoals, Alabama. With a love for music coming from both sides of their family (their grandfather and his brothers forged a group called the Happy Valley Boys), they grew up with a zeal for country music and sang songs with their family by country music artists such as Don Williams. The girls first learned to harmonize through singing a cappella at their hometown church. Laura and Lydia never considered a singing career as a duo. Laura went to Middle Tennessee State University to pursue a career in business, while Lydia was considered the "real" singer of the family.

=== 2010: Discovery and debut album ===
Laura traveled to Nashville, Tennessee for an impromptu audition at Hotel Indigo where music business record executive Andrew Brightman and producer Dave Cobb were present, looking to create a new singing group. Lydia could not attend the audition, so Laura traveled by herself, where she auditioned with "Same Old You" by Miranda Lambert. Representatives from the audition soon asked her to come back to Nashville, to which she asked if she could bring her sister Lydia along. Lydia showed up later and they were asked to sing together, resulting in the formation of the Secret Sisters. The girls were soon flown to Los Angeles for their first time in the studio to record a couple of demos. For Laura, it was her first time in an airplane. The demos were produced and record companies began responding accordingly. Within weeks, they were assigned to Universal Republic Records and the song selection process for their debut album began.

Their self-titled debut album consists of cover songs such as "Why Don't Ya Love Me?", "Why Baby Why", the Frank Sinatra song "Somethin' Stupid", and Nancy Baron's "I've Got a Feeling". The album also includes two originals written by Laura Rogers: "Tennessee Me" and "Waste the Day". It was recorded in two weeks at Blackbird Studios and produced by Dave Cobb, who had worked with artists such as Waylon Jennings and Jamey Johnson. T Bone Burnett served as the executive producer.

The Secret Sisters brought in studio musicians such as steel guitar player Robbie Turner and pianist Pig Robbins. The album was recorded with classic analog equipment. The production team and the sisters used vintage microphones and classic recording techniques, down to the same type of tape they would have used fifty years earlier. The album was released October 12, 2010. Laura tried to describe the experience: "In so many ways we are still the same kids who would perform songs in our parents' room, when we sang about silver threads and golden needles and cold-hearted snakes, and all that. Even with everything that's happened – getting that dream chance to make our own album, I really believe we've just found where we're supposed to be."

In addition to their debut album, they recorded covers of Johnny Cash's "Big River" and the traditional folk song "Wabash Cannonball" at Jack White's studio, with White accompanying them on guitar. It was released as a 7-inch single via Third Man Records.

Their song "Tomorrow Will Be Kinder", inspired by the tornadoes that swept through Alabama in 2011, was featured on the album The Hunger Games: Songs From District 12 and Beyond, although the song was not featured in the film.

=== 2014: Put Your Needle Down ===
The duo recorded their second album in December 2012 and January 2013 at the Village Recording Studios, Los Angeles, with T Bone Burnett as producer.

The album, Put Your Needle Down, was released on April 15, 2014. It debuted at No. 110 on the Billboard 200, and at No. 18 on the Top Country Albums chart with 3,700 copies sold in its debut week. Reviews were mixed. Several critics expressed disappointment with the album's production and songwriting.

=== 2015: Dropped by Republic Universal Records ===
The Secret Sisters were dropped from Republic Universal Records in 2015. At that point, the duo couldn't afford to pay a band to go on tour and soon faced bankruptcy. As reported in Rolling Stone, "There was a lawsuit with a former manager to overcome, the shadow of impending bankruptcy and the loss of their record deal following the commercial failure of their second album, 2014's Put Your Needle Down. It all resulted in an overbearing feeling of despair for both Laura and Lydia." All of these challenges caused a major songwriting block for the duo. Because of these financial and artistic setbacks, they returned to their home in Alabama and considered giving up music altogether.

During the fall of 2015, singer-songwriter Brandi Carlile invited the Rogers sisters to open shows for her, including two notable hometown Seattle concerts. During soundcheck, Laura and Lydia tried out "Tennessee River Runs Low," a new song that would eventually end up as the lead single from You Don't Own Me Anymore. Carlile had been listening from the auditorium seats and shouted her enthusiasm, encouraging the duo to share the rest of the songs they had recently written. Soon, Carlile was producing their next album.

=== 2017: You Don't Own Me Anymore ===
The sisters' third album, You Don't Own Me Anymore, was produced by Brandi Carlile and Tim and Phil Hanseroth, mixed by Grammy-winner Trina Shoemaker, and recorded by Jerry Streeter at Bear Creek Studio in Woodinville, WA (except the track “The Damage” which was recorded by Josh Evans at HockeyTalkter Studio in Seattle, WA.) In order to fund the new album, the sisters launched a successful PledgeMusic campaign that raised 50% of their goal in just 48 hours (and exceeded it in just over a month) with nearly 1,500 fans coming forward to personally help them rebuild. The album was released on New West Records on June 9, 2017. It peaked at number 40 on Billboard's Top Album Sales chart in July 2017.

The album consists of songs such as "He's Fine", "To All the Girls Who Cry", "Mississippi", "The Tennessee River Runs Low", and "You Don't Own Me Anymore".

The Secret Sisters went on tour in 2017 in support of their new record. The tour launched on May 13 in their hometown of Florence, Alabama and continued touring through the end of 2017.

The album also garnered the duo's first Grammy nomination, in the category of Grammy Award for Best Folk Album, though they lost to Aimee Mann for her album Mental Illness.

=== 2020: Saturn Return ===
Carlile and the Hanseroth twins again produced the sisters' fourth album, Saturn Return, which was released on February 28, 2020. As with their previous record, You Don't Own Me Anymore, the tracks for Saturn Return were recorded at Brandi Carlile's home studio near Seattle. Between the completion of the album's recording in early 2019 and its release in February 2020, both Laura and Lydia gave birth to children; as Lydia stated in an interview with Rolling Stone, "The songs on this record will always feel like that lucky photo you accidentally capture, at just the right moment, in just the right light... because it forever documented us as the women we were before the page turned into a new chapter — motherhood, adulthood, grown-up grief, career identity, cultural identity, lifelong love." Rolling Stone praised Saturn Return as a "stunning country-soul opus" and gave the album a four-star review. American Songwriter also gave the album 4/5 stars, describing Saturn Return as "simply stellar" and "beautifully conceived, often introspective but never insular rootsy folk and pop."

=== 2024: Mind, Man, Medicine ===
The Secret Sisters' fifth studio album, Mind, Man, Medicine was released on March 29, 2024. It was co-produced by the Secret Sisters, John Paul White, and Ben Tanner, and was primarily recorded at FAME Studios in Muscle Shoals, Alabama.

== Discography ==
=== Albums ===
Title	Details	Peak chart positions					Sales
Title	Details	US Country	US	US Heat	US Folk	UK	Sales
The Secret Sisters	Release date: October 12, 2010; Label: Universal Republic Records	27	200	3	8	29	
Put Your Needle Down	Release date: April 15, 2014; Label: Republic Records	18	110	1	3	—	
You Don't Own Me Anymore	Release date: June 9, 2017; Label: New West Records	30	167	3	7	—	US: 6,200
Saturn Return	Release date: February 28, 2020; Label: New West Records	—	—	25	—	—	US: 2,200
Mind, Man, Medicine	Release date: March 29, 2024; Label: New West Records	—	—	—	—	—	
"—" denotes releases that did not chart

=== Singles ===
Year	Single	Album
2010	"I've Got a Feeling"	The Secret Sisters
2013	"Let There Be Lonely"	Put Your Needle Down
2014	"Rattle My Bones"	Put Your Needle Down
2014	"Iuka"	Put Your Needle Down
2014	"Dirty Lie"	Put Your Needle Down
2014	"Black And Blue"	Put Your Needle Down
2014	"The Pocket Knife"	Put Your Needle Down
2017	"Tennessee River Runs Low"	You Don't Own Me Anymore
2017	"He's Fine"	You Don't Own Me Anymore
2017	"You Don't Own Me Anymore"	You Don't Own Me Anymore
2018	"I Have Met My Love Today"	Spotify Singles–with John Prine
2018	"I Just Called to Say I Love You"	Spotify Singles–with John Prine
2019	"Cabin"	Saturn Return
2019	"Hold You Dear"	Saturn Return
2020	"Hand Over My Heart"	Saturn Return
2020	"Late Bloomer"	Saturn Return
2024	"Same Water"	Mind, Man, Medicine
2024	"All the Ways"	Mind, Man, Medicine
2024	"Paperweight"	Mind, Man, Medicine
2024	"Mama Now"	Non-album single

=== Album appearances ===
Year	Song	Album
2011	"One Way Ticket to the Moon"	The Blackbird Diaries (Dave Stewart album)
2011	"Country Wine"	The Blackbird Diaries (Dave Stewart album)
2011	"The One I Love Is Gone (Live)"	T-Bone Burnett Presents The Speaking Clock Revue: Live From The Beacon Theatre (T-Bone Burnett album)
2012	"Tomorrow Will Be Kinder"	The Hunger Games: Songs from District 12 and Beyond
2012	"Peggy Gordon"	Voice of Ages (The Chieftains album)
2013	"It Won't Be Very Long"	To All the Girls... (Willie Nelson album)
2016	"I've Been Over This Before"	Beulah (John Paul White album)
2016	"Dangerous Things"	Dangerous Things (Dan Layus album)
2016	"Four Rings"	Dangerous Things (Dan Layus album)
2016	"You Can Have Mine"	Dangerous Things (Dan Layus album)
2016	"Only Gets Darker"	Dangerous Things (Dan Layus album)
2016	"The Nightbird"	Dangerous Things (Dan Layus album)
2017	"Losing Heart"	Cover Stories (Brandi Carlile album)
2026	"Coffee and Cigarettes (20th Anniversary"	Coffee and Cigarettes (20th Anniversary) (Augustana single)

=== Music videos ===
Year	Video	Director
2011	"Tennessee Me"	David McClister
2013	"Lonely Island"	
2014	"Rattle My Bones"	
2017	"Tennessee River Runs Low"	Tyler Jones
2017	"You Don't Own Me Anymore"	Tyler Jones
2024	"All the Ways"	Brandon Ward

== Television appearances ==
- Late Show with David Letterman, November 2010
- Hootenanny, BBC Television, New Year's Eve 2010
- The Tonight Show with Jay Leno, March 2012
- The Tonight Show Starring Jimmy Fallon, August 2014
