= Sunny War =

American folk-punk singer and songwriter

- Born: Sydney Lyndella Ward; November 30, 1990 (age 35) (Note: Per Paste, Ward was born in 1990. Ward posted to Instagram about her birthday on November 30 in both 2021 and 2024.); Nashville, Tennessee, U.S.
- Genres: Folk punk; rock; folk; Americana
- Occupations: Singer; songwriter; producer
- Instruments: Vocals; guitar
- Years active: 2014–present
- Website: sunnywar.com

Sydney Lyndella Ward (born November 30, 1990), known professionally as Sunny War, is an American singer and songwriter from Nashville, Tennessee. Her sound is frequently categorized as folk punk, while her songwriting is often described as introspective. Her songs blend rock, gospel, and country music. She began her music career in 2014 with the release of her extended play Worthless, but garnered mainstream attention and critical praise after the release of her 2020s albums.

== Early life ==
Sydney Lyndella Ward was born in Nashville, Tennessee, to a single mother on November 30, 1990. At age 7, her mother bought her a guitar, and she took classes on the piano and the harmonica. When she was in middle school, she moved from Tennessee to California. She taught herself to play the guitar from watching and mimicking how her friend's father played the banjo, which resulted in her distinctive finger picking style.

== Career ==
=== Career beginnings ===
In her early twenties, Ward quit her job in a mall to pursue music full time. Her first EP as a solo artist was Worthless. She sold Worthless CDs on the Venice, California boardwalk.

=== Mainstream success ===
Her 2021 album, Simple Syrup, saw her receive broader mainstream recognition. Her follow-up, Anarchist Gospel, was lauded by critics, with Jonathan Bernstein of Rolling Stone calling it a "powerful statement" and Pitchfork's Stephen Erlewine calling the record "emotionally resonant and curiously hopeful." 2025's Armageddon in a Summer Dress was also critically acclaimed.

== Discography ==
EPs

- Worthless (2014)
- Red, White and Blue (2016)
- With the Sun (2018)
- Can I Sit with You? (2020)

Studio albums

- Particle War (2018) — collaborative album with Particle Kid
- Shell of a Girl (2019)
- Simple Syrup (2021)
- Anarchist Gospel (2023)
- Armageddon in a Summer Dress (2025)
