= Mingo Fishtrap =

American soul and funk band

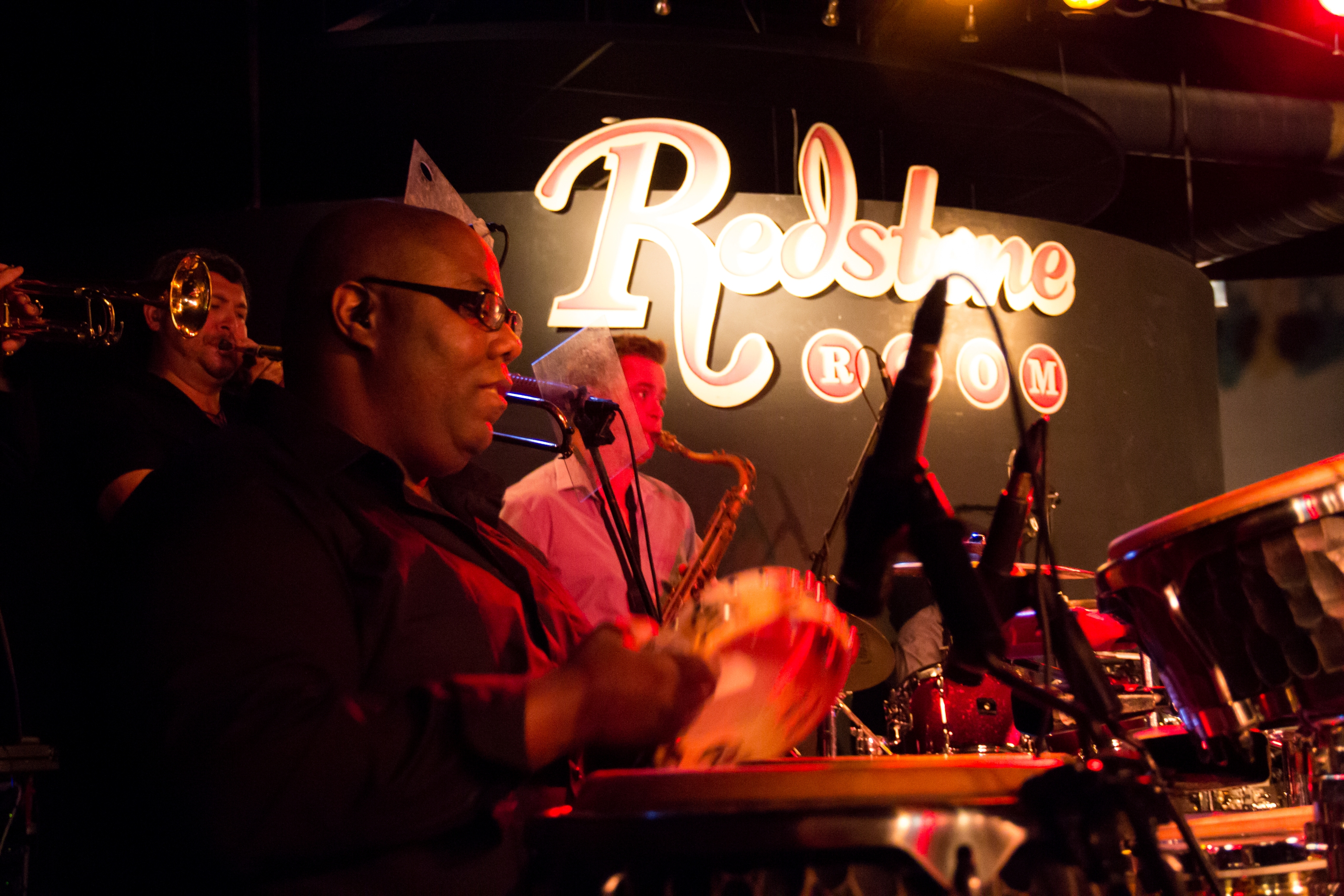

Background information
- Genres: Soul, funk
- Years active: 1996 – present
- Labels: Blue Corn Music
- Members: Roger Blevins Jr.; Chip Vayenas; Dane Farnsworth; Aaron Hatmaker; Steve Butts; Dan Bechdolt; Brian Busch
- Past members: Scott Davis; Mark Gonzales; Aeron Riordon; Tim Young; Paul Elder; Michael Duffy; Greg Wilson; Mikel Urdy; Zol Waterhouse; Deb Agena (Coldiron); Roger Blevins Sr.
- Website: mingofishtrap.com

Mingo Fishtrap is a soul and funk band based in Austin, Texas. They were formed in the mid-1990s in Denton, Texas. The band consists of Roger Blevins, Jr. (guitar/lead vocals), Chip Vayenas (drums/vocals), Dane Farnsworth (organ/keyboards), Roger Blevins Sr. (bass), Steve Butts (trumpet/flugelhorn), and Dan Bechdolt (tenor saxophone). They have, with a few personnel changes over the years, released six albums and one concert video.

== Reception ==
Before a performance in Raleigh, North Carolina, in July 2016, Indy Week's Timothy Bracy wrote, "Long-running Austin soul and funk outfit Mingo Fishtrap features an agreeably accomplished horn-driven sound evocative of everything from Curtis Mayfield to early Chicago. Infectious tunes and plentiful chops figure to make for a crowd-pleasing evening."

== Discography ==
- 1997: Succotash
- 2000: From the Private Bag
- 2004: EP2
- 2005: Yesterday
- 2006: Live at the Granada
- 2008: EP3
- 2010: In the Meantime
- 2014: On Time
