= Teresa James =

American aviator

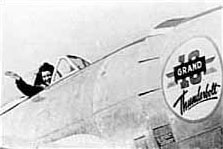
- Teresa James in a P-47 Thunderbolt
- Born: January 27, 1914; Pittsburgh, Pennsylvania, U.S.
- Died: July 26, 2008 (aged 94)
- Occupations: Aviator; Stunt Pilot
- Spouse: George "Dink" Martin

Teresa D. "Jamesy" James (January 27, 1914 – July 26, 2008) was an American aviator. James was one of the first Women Airforce Service Pilots (WASP) pilots, starting out as part of the Women's Auxiliary Ferrying Squadron (WAFS) in 1942. James was also known as a stunt pilot and later became a Major in the Air Force Reserves. James flew most of her life and fought for military recognition for the WASP.

== Biography ==
James was born on January 27, 1914, in Pittsburgh. Initially afraid of flying, she went on to earn her pilot's license in order to attract the attention of a pilot named Bill, on whom she had a crush. James had seen a plane wreck the year before she started flying and shortly after, her brother had also nearly died in a plane crash. Bill invited her to fly and she went with him and later learned to fly to impress him. Her first flight took place from the Wilkinsburg Airport on September 30, 1933. James learned to fly with a friend, Harry Fogle, in an OX-5 powered Travel Air 2000 and began working as a stunt pilot with Fogle and his friends. In her stunt debut, she made $50 and performed an aerial spin of 12 1/2 rotations as she dove. She and Fogle were billed as the "Girl Stunt Pilot" and "The Flying Iceman." Her signature stunt move was a 26-turn spin. James also started ice skating after pilots she worked with "practically dared" her to skate. James became a speed skater. In 1939, she competed in the Pennsylvania Skating Association's championship meet.

James went on to earn a commercial license in 1941 and became a flight instructor. James was the first woman flight instructor to graduate from the Buffalo Aeronautical Institute. She married one of her students, George "Dink" Martin in 1942. Three months after she was married, she was invited to join the Women's Auxiliary Ferrying Squadron (WAFS). James received a telegram on September 9, 1942, requesting that she report to the New Castle Army Air Base. James' husband was also called to the war effort and was sent overseas to work as a bomber pilot. He would eventually be listed as missing in action and declared dead by the Army. James wouldn't learn the full story of Martin's death until 1984, when she met the twin sons of the man who pulled his body out of the plane wreckage. Martin was killed on June 22, 1944, during a mission flying near Paris.

James passed her flying and physical tests for the WAFS and was sworn in on October 6, 1942. James was one of the first women in the WAFS and was assigned the first long-distance solo mission. The mission was to ferry a PT-19 from Maryland to California. James stayed with the WAFS as they were merged to form the Women Airforce Service Pilots (WASP) and until the organization was disbanded on December 20, 1944.

After WASP was discontinued, James returned to Pittsburgh and found that there were not very many opportunities for women pilots any longer. James wrote to Congress, requesting veterans' status for the WASP. She even wrote to the Chinese Air Force, requesting to fly for them, but was rejected. James would continue to fight for the WASP to be recognized with veterans status.

In 1950, she became a commissioned major in the United States Air Force Reserves. Like other WASPs, she didn't get credit for her service as a pilot between 1942 and 1944. Between 1961 and 1965, she was stationed at Elmendorf Air Force Base as part of the 5040th Air Base Group. In 1976, she retired from the Air Force. She moved to Lake Worth Beach in 1979 to be closer to her parents. James stayed active with flying groups during her retirement. She was a member of the Ninety Nines, and the P-47 Thunderbolt Pilots Association. When the Grumman corporation heard her say in a CBS documentary about the Air Force, Top Flight, that the only thing she hadn't flown was a jet, the company arranged for her to fly an F-14. She was still flying at age 86 in 1997.

On July 26, 2008, James died in hospice. Her remains were cremated and interred in Pittsburgh. In 1992, a biography about James, called On Wings to War: Teresa James, Aviator and written by Jan Churchill was published. The book gives a "personal 'view from the cockpit' account of James' time as a WASP. James' WAFS uniform is in the collection of the Smithsonian Air and Space Museum.
