= New West Records =

- Founded: 1998
- Founder: Cameron Strang
- Distributors: Redeye Distribution (US); PIAS Group (EU)
- Genre: Indie rock, alternative country, Americana
- Country of origin: United States
- Location: Nashville, Tennessee; Athens, Georgia
- Official website: newwestrecords.com

New West Records is a record label based in Nashville and Athens, Georgia. It previously had offices in Burbank, California and Beverly Hills, California. From 2013 to 2018, New West's records in the U.S. were distributed by Alternative Distribution Alliance, and since September 2018, Redeye Distribution has taken over American distribution. New West Records exclusively releases CDs and DVDs for the award-winning television program Austin City Limits.

== History ==
New West Records was founded in 1998 by Cameron Strang with the mission of promoting “real music for real people.” Over the years, the label became a key player in the Americana, indie rock, and alternative country scenes, releasing albums that topped the Billboard Top 200 and earned Grammy recognition.

In 2007 and 2008 New West was recognized by NARM as the entertainment software supplier of the year.

In 2010, New West Records acquired Antone’s Records and Watermelon Records, two labels with a focus on Texas blues, soul, and rock. This acquisition expanded New West's catalog and contributed to its presence in the roots and Americana music scenes.

In 2011, Cameron Strang left New West to take on the role of CEO of Warner Chappell Music, marking a significant transition in the label's leadership.

In 2014, John Allen was named President of New West Records and its various imprints. Under his leadership, the label's operations were consolidated, and the main office was moved to Nashville, further establishing New West's presence in the heart of the Americana and country music scenes.

New West executive George Fontaine Sr received a Lifetime Achievement Award at the 2023 Americana Music Honors & Awards for his work with the label.

== Artists ==
New West Records is home to a number of Grammy Award-winning artists including Dwight Yoakam, Steve Earle, Rickie Lee Jones, Kris Kristofferson, and Delbert McClinton. The label roster features Sara Watkins, 49 Winchester, Los Lobos, Ben Folds, The Devil Makes Three, JD McPherson, Buddy Miller, Corb Lund, Nikki Lane, Rodney Crowell, John Hiatt, James McMurtry, Caroline Rose, Richard Thompson, Nada Surf, Sunny War, The Wallflowers, Jaime Wyatt, Josh Rouse and more. The catalogue includes releases from Drive-By Truckers, Jason Isbell, All Them Witches, Shovels & Rope, Justin Townes Earle, Patty Griffin, Old 97's, Ron Gallo, Vic Chesnutt, Pylon (band), Aaron Lee Tasjan, American Aquarium, and Tony Joe White.

== Awards ==
New West Records has received numerous award nominations and wins, including recognition at the Grammy Awards and Americana Music Awards.

=== Grammy Awards ===
Year	Category	Nominee(s)	Work	Result
2024	Best Americana Album	Rodney Crowell	The Chicago Sessions	Nominated
2023	Best Country Solo Performance	Willie Nelson	"Live Forever"	Won
2023	Best Contemporary Blues Album	North Mississippi Allstars	Set Sail	Nominated
2022	Best Americana Album	Los Lobos	Native Sons	Won
2022	Best Americana Album	John Hiatt & the Jerry Douglas Band	Leftover Feelings	Nominated
2021	Best Folk Album	The Secret Sisters	Saturn Return	Nominated
2021	Best Contemporary Blues Album	North Mississippi Allstars	Up And Rolling	Nominated
2021	Best Folk Album	The Secret Sisters	You Don't Own Me Anymore	Nominated
2018	Best American Roots Song	Rodney Crowell (featuring Rosanne Cash, John Paul White)	"It Ain’t Over Yet"	Nominated
2017	Best Traditional Blues Album	Luther Dickinson	Blues & Ballads	Nominated
2015	Best Americana Album	John Hiatt	Terms of My Surrender	Nominated
2015	Best American Roots Song	John Hiatt	"Terms of My Surrender"	Nominated
2014	Best Americana Album	Buddy Miller & Jim Lauderdale	Buddy & Jim	Nominated
2012	Best Folk Album	Steve Earle	I'll Never Get Out Of This World Alive	Nominated
2011	Best Compilation Soundtrack Album for Motion Picture, Television or other Visual Media	Various Artists	Crazy Heart	Won
2011	Best Song Written for Motion Picture, Television, or other Visual Media	Ryan Bingham & T Bone Burnett	"The Weary Kind" (from Crazy Heart)	Won
2010	Best Contemporary Folk Album	Steve Earle	Townes	Won
2008	Best Contemporary Folk Album	Steve Earle	Washington Square Serenade	Won
2008	Best Country Collaboration with Vocals	Steve Earle	"Days Aren't Long Enough"	Nominated
2006	Best Contemporary Blues Album	Delbert McClinton	Cost of Living	Won
2006	Best Male Country Performance	Delbert McClinton	"Midnight Communion"	Nominated
2005	Best Southern, Country or Bluegrass Gospel Album	Buddy Miller	Universal United House of Prayer	Nominated
2003	Best Contemporary Blues Album	Delbert McClinton	Room to Breathe	Nominated
2002	Best Contemporary Blues Album	Delbert McClinton	Nothing Personal	Won

=== Americana Music Honors & Awards ===
Year	Category	Nominee(s)	Work	Result
2023	Duo/Group of the Year	49 Winchester	—	Nominated
2023	Emerging Artist of the Year	Sunny War	—	Nominated
2022	Duo/Group of the Year	Los Lobos	—	Nominated
2022	Song of the Year	James McMurtry	"Canola Fields"	Nominated
2021	Album of the Year	Steve Earle	J.T.	Nominated
2020	Duo/Group of the Year	Buddy & Julie Miller	—	Nominated
2018	Emerging Act of the Year	Lilly Hiatt	—	Nominated
2017	Song of the Year	Rodney Crowell (featuring Rosanne Cash, John Paul White)	"It Ain’t Over Yet"	Won
2017	Album of the Year	Rodney Crowell	Close Ties	Nominated
2017	Emerging Artist of the Year	Aaron Lee Tasjan	—	Nominated
2016	Instrumentalist of the Year	Sara Watkins	—	Won
2015	Song of the Year	John Hiatt	"Terms of My Surrender"	Nominated
2015	Song of the Year	Steve Earle & The Dukes	"You're The Best Lover That I Ever Had"	Nominated
2015	Emerging Artist of the Year	Nikki Lane	—	Nominated
2014	Album of the Year	Robert Ellis	The Lights From The Chemical Plant	Nominated
2014	Artist of the Year	Robert Ellis	—	Nominated
2014	Duo/Group of the Year	The Devil Makes Three	—	Nominated
2014	Instrumentalist of the Year	Buddy Miller	—	Won
2013	Album of the Year	Buddy Miller & Jim Lauderdale	Buddy & Jim	Nominated
2013	Duo/Group of the Year	Buddy Miller & Jim Lauderdale	—	Nominated
2013	Artist of the Year	Buddy Miller	—	Nominated
2013	Artist of the Year	Richard Thompson	—	Nominated
2013	Song of the Year	Richard Thompson	"Good Things Happen To Bad People"	Nominated
2012	Emerging Artist of the Year	Robert Ellis	—	Nominated
2012	Instrumentalist of the Year	Buddy Miller	—	Nominated
2012	Song of the Year	Steve Earle	"Waiting On The Sky To Fall"	Nominated
2012	Album of the Year	Steve Earle	I'll Never Get Out Of This World Alive	Nominated
2011	Artist of the Year	Buddy Miller	—	Won
2011	Instrumentalist of the Year	Buddy Miller	—	Won
2010	Song of the Year	Ryan Bingham	"The Weary Kind" (from Crazy Heart soundtrack)	Won
2010	Instrumentalist of the Year	Buddy Miller	—	Won
2010	Artist of the Year	Steve Earle	—	Nominated
2009	Album of the Year	Buddy & Julie Miller	Written In Chalk	Won
2009	Artist of the Year	Buddy Miller	—	Won
2009	Duo/Group of the Year	Buddy & Julie Miller	—	Won
2009	Song of the Year	Buddy & Julie Miller	"Chalk"	Won
2009	Instrumentalist of the Year	Buddy Miller	—	Won
2009	Song of the Year	The Flatlanders	"Homeland Refugee"	Nominated
2008	Artist of the Year	Steve Earle	—	Nominated
2008	Lifetime Achievement Award for Songwriting	John Hiatt	—	Won
2008	Instrumentalist of the Year	Buddy Miller	—	Won
2006	Duo/Group of the Year	Drive-By Truckers	—	Won
2006	Album of the Year	Delbert McClinton	Cost of Living	Nominated

== See also ==
- List of New West Records artists
