= Orange whip =

Creamy cocktail

- Type: Cocktail
- Ingredients: 4oz (four parts) orange juice; 1oz (one part) rum; 1oz (one part) vodka; 2oz (two parts) cream
- Base spirit: Vodka, Rum
- Standard drinkware: Collins glass
- Standard garnish: None
- Served: blended (no ice); then on the rocks
- Preparation: Blend briefly with hand blender. Pour ingredients over ice and stir.

An orange whip is a sweet cocktail made with rum, vodka, cream and orange juice. It is typically blended to a froth like a milkshake, and poured over ice in a Collins glass.

== Other drinks ==
"Orange Whip" has also been used as brand name for non-alcoholic drinks. In the 1950s, the Tropical Fruit Company marketed an "Orange Whip" concentrate to be served as a fountain beverage. Jeanne Carmen, an actress and pinup model from that period, was once dubbed "Miss Orange Whip". The US Patent and Trademark Office lists various applications for the "Orange Whip" trademark to be applied to drinks and a chain of juice stores.

== Cultural references ==
=== The Blues Brothers ===
The drink had a resurgence after the release of The Blues Brothers. In the film, Jake's parole officer, Burton Mercer (John Candy), attends the film's pivotal fund-raising concert in order to arrest Jake and Elwood. However, Mercer decides he wants to see them perform first and orders drinks for himself and the uniformed state troopers he is with, getting silence in response after saying: "Who wants an orange whip? Orange whip? Orange whip? Three orange whips!"

The drink was not in the original script. Kenny Dugan, Orange Whip's sales director at the time, had been providing refreshments for the cast and asked if his product could be mentioned in the film. Director John Landis mentioned this to Candy, who improvised the exchange.

=== Pop culture ===
- In episode 1 of the 6th season of The Blacklist the character Dembe Zuma asks the other characters if they’d like three orange whips.
- The Veronica Mars episode "Of Vice and Men" alluded to The Blues Brothers line when the character Veronica, a private investigator, says: "Egg sandwich? Egg sandwich? Orange Whip?"
- Rock band Seven Mary Three calls orange whips "a good time that never ends" in their song "Strangely at Home Here" from their 2008 album day&nightdriving.
- The Bates College Men's Ultimate team is named Orange Whip.
- In the HBO show The Wire, an uncredited character known as "Pat's Dad" in the episode "The Buys" alluded to a line from The Blues Brothers when he says: "Orange Whip? Orange Whip? Three Orange Whips!".
- The term orange whip is also used by the military in Afghanistan as a slang term to ask if someone would like to go to the mess hall to eat or is at the mess hall eating. Used in a sentence: "The CJ5 FUPLANS section is out orange-whipping".
- In the ABC sitcom Happy Endings episode "The Girl with the David Tattoo" the bartender asks Max and Jane if they'd like Orange Whips after they talk. The show takes place in Chicago and this is likely a reference to the Blues Brothers.
- The drink inspired the naming of the "Orange Whip" nightclub in Ringwood, Victoria, Australia.

== See also ==
- List of cocktails
