= Kevin McKendree =

- Born: Kevin Yates McKendree; April 27, 1969 (age 56); Nuremberg, Germany
- Origin: Washington, D.C., U.S.
- Genres: Electric blues
- Occupation: Musician
- Instruments: Keyboards, guitar, vocals
- Years active: 1987–present
- Website: Official website

Kevin Yates McKendree (born April 27, 1969) is an American electric blues pianist, keyboardist, guitarist, singer, and songwriter. In addition to having a lengthy and varied career as a session musician, McKendree has released two solo albums.

== Life and career ==
Born Kevin Yates McKendree, in Nuremberg, Germany, he is a self-taught pianist and guitarist, initially utilizing the playing of Little Richard, Ray Charles and B.B. King as inspiration. When he was 17, he became a professional musician and worked around the Washington, D.C. area playing alongside Big Joe Maher, Tom Principato, Bob Margolin and Mark Wenner. However, he also worked as a piano salesman to supplement his income. He relocated to Nashville in 1995, and secured a job backing Lee Roy Parnell as part of his band known as the Hot Links. McKendree co-wrote and co-produced the instrumental track "Mama, Screw Your Wig On Tight," which appeared on Parnell's 1997 album, Every Night's a Saturday Night. The piece was nominated for a Grammy Award in 1997 for Best Country Instrumental.

In 1997, McKendree toured with Delbert McClinton as his band leader, and played piano and Hammond B3 organ on McClinton's albums Nothing Personal (2001) and Cost of Living (2005), both of which won a Grammy, and Room to Breathe (2002) which was nominated for a similar award. Also McKendree worked in the recording studio backing a diverse array of musicians including Anson Funderburgh and Seven Mary Three (The Economy of Sound, Orange Ave.), as well as issuing his debut solo album Miss Laura's Kitchen in 2000. His association with McClinton ended in 2011 allowing McKendree more flexibility. He worked with Brian Setzer, John Oates, T. Graham Brown, Tinsley Ellis, The Knockouts, Hal Ketchum, and George Thorogood (2120 South Michigan Ave.) amongst many others. His work with Tinsley Ellis has had him playing on, and occasionally producing, several of Ellis' albums, including Fire It Up, Kingpin, Hell or High Water, Moment of Truth, Speak No Evil, The Hard Way, and Speak No Evil, among others.

In 2005, McKendree issued his second album, Hammers & Strings. AllMusic noted that it was "a set full of boogie-woogie piano (even on non-blues tunes), blues ballads, and New Orleans-style R&B, this is a delightful outing." In the same year McKendree played on Brian Setzer's album, Rockabilly Riot Vol. 1: A Tribute To Sun Records. In 2008, McKendree contributed to Randy Houser's debut album, Anything Goes, playing Wurlitzer electric piano and Hammond organ.

More recently, McKendree has focused on songwriting and production work in his own recording studio, The Rock House, which is based in Franklin, Tennessee. In 2013, he engineered Sean Chambers' album, The Rock House Sessions, which was recorded in his own studio.

McKendree performs regularly, most recently playing in the Mike Henderson Band at the Bluebird Cafe in Nashville.

== Grammy awards and nominations ==
Year	Nominee / work	Award	Result	Ref.
2020	Tall, Dark, & Handsome	Grammy Award for Best Traditional Blues Album	Won	

== Discography ==
Year	Title	Record label
2000	Miss Laura's Kitchen	East Folks Records
2005	Hammers & Strings	Powerhouse Records

== See also ==
- List of electric blues musicians
