= Long Time Coming =

Long Time Coming or Long Time Comin' may refer to:

== Albums ==
- A Long Time Comin', by the Electric Flag, 1968
- A Long Time Coming, by Wayne Brady, 2008
- A Long Time Coming (A Change Is Gonna Come), by Evelyn "Champagne" King, 1985
- Long Time Comin', by Shenandoah, 1992
- Long Time Coming (Nappy Brown album), 2007
- Long Time Coming (Sierra Ferrell album), 2021
- Long Time Coming (Jonny Lang album) or the title song, 2003
- Long Time Coming (Ready for the World album) or the title song, 1986
- Long Time Coming, by eLDee, 2004

== Songs ==
- "Long Time Coming" (Cheap Trick song), 2017
- "Long Time Coming" (Delays song), 2004
- "Long Time Comin'", by Bruce Springsteen from Devils & Dust, 2005
- "Long Time Comin'", by John Hiatt from Terms of My Surrender, 2014
- "Long Time Comin'", by Florida Georgia Line from Life Rolls On, 2021
- "Long Time Coming", by Humanzi, 2006

== Television ==
- "Long Time Coming" (Homeland), an episode
