= Water's Edge =

Single by Seven Mary Three

from the album American Standard
- Released: November 21, 1996 (Australia)
- Recorded: June – July 1995 at Morrisound Recording in Tampa, FL
- Genre: Post-grunge
- Length: 3:52
- Label: Mammoth
- Songwriters: Jason Ross and Jason Pollock
- Producers: Jason Ross, Jason Pollock, and Tom Morris

Seven Mary Three singles chronology
"Cumbersome" (1996)	"Water's Edge" (1996)	"My My" (1996)

Music video
- "Water's Edge" on YouTube

"Water's Edge" is a song by Seven Mary Three and the second single released from their second album, American Standard. It was originally included on their independently released debut album, Churn, in 1994. The single was released in 1996 and became one of the band's most popular songs, reaching #7 on Billboard's Mainstream Rock Tracks.

== Overview ==
The original five-minute version of "Water's Edge" was condensed and became the opening track to 1995's American Standard. It didn't manage to replicate the success of the band's chart-topping debut single, "Cumbersome," but nevertheless charted well and continues to receive radio play. When Seven Mary Three opened for 3 Doors Down on a 2003 tour, the latter group claimed to have covered "Water's Edge" among other 7M3 songs during their early days.

"Water's Edge" details the story behind a bloated corpse being found in a river or creek; it has been said to be inspired by the 1986 film River's Edge, but this is not well confirmed. Other accounts indicate that the song is based on a book that Jason Ross read while in college at William and Mary. The song's narrator admits that he witnessed a woman being tossed in the water to drown. He recalls seeing her just before a van of people drove up and subdued the woman, but notes that he cannot confess his witnessing the crime out of fear of their power. Musically, "Water's Edge" relies on a soft verse, heavy chorus style. Muted guitar chords and harmonics between verses also offer a delicate side to this dark, aggressive song. During the bridge, the narrator furiously ridicules himself for not intervening with the incident.

== Music video ==
Thomas Mignone, who would later become known for his heavy metal music videos, directed the symbolic "Water's Edge" video. All band performance and story concept footage was shot in the woods and at a creekside building during winter. The video focuses on a young boy walking through the woods and spotting a suspicious man. The boy opens a tent to see strange hand puppets cavorting amongst one another. This is intertwined with footage of people in large costumes similar to the puppets who are harassing a woman outside. A man is also shown observing through a window in the building before removing a floor cover and heading below. The boy closes the tent and runs away as the video ends.

== Track listings ==
1. "Water's Edge"
2. "Shelf Life"
3. "Lame" (Acoustic/Electric)
4. "Cumbersome" (Acoustic Version)

== Chart positions ==
Chart (1996)	Peak position
Canada Rock/Alternative (RPM)	22
US Mainstream Rock (Billboard)	7
US Modern Rock Tracks (Billboard)	37
