= Something Gonna Jump Out the Bushes! =

Studio album by Nappy Brown
- Released: 1987
- Studio: Goodnight
- Genres: Blues, R&B
- Label: Black Top
- Producer: Hammond Scott

Nappy Brown chronology
| Don't Be Angry! (1984) | Something Gonna Jump; Out the Bushes! (1987) | Deep Sea Diver (1989) |

Something Gonna Jump Out the Bushes! is an album by the American musician Nappy Brown. It was released via Black Top Records in 1987. Brown supported the album with several concert appearances.

== Production ==
The album was produced by Hammond Scott. Earl King, Ronnie Earl, and Anson Funderburgh were among the album's guitar players. Ron Levy contributed on keyboards. Brown wrote the title track, which he compared to his song "Lemon Squeezin' Daddy". "Your Love Is Real" was written by Robert Ward. "You Were a Long Time Coming" is a version of Brown's old Savoy Records song. "My Jug and I" is a cover of the Percy Mayfield song. "Nothing Takes the Place of You" is a cover of the Toussaint McCall classic.

== Critical reception ==
Professional ratings
Review scores
| Source | Rating |
|---|---|
| AllMusic | 4/5 stars |
| The Grove Press Guide to the Blues on CD | 3/5 stars |
| MusicHound Blues: The Essential Album Guide | 3/5 stars |
| The Rolling Stone Album Guide | 3/5 stars |
| The Virgin Encyclopedia of R&B and Soul | 3/5 stars |

The Washington Post wrote that while Brown's "voice is pliable enough to expertly handle a laconic blues like 'My Jug and I', its bellowing force remains its greatest asset." The Boston Globe said that "Brown's deep, rich voice is pure blues, but always shaded with a soaring gospel feel." The New York Daily News praised the "authentic R&B shouter sound." The Buffalo News determined that "the change of pace is his stock-in-trade, and he's satisfying at any speed."

The Press of Atlantic City called Brown a master "of sacred music and R&B," writing that Something Gonna Jump Out the Bushes! may prove to be one of the best albums of 1988. The Commercial Appeal concluded that the album shows "that it's possible for a '50s survivor to do something besides recycle past glories." The Columbia Record labeled the album "such a powerful effort," writing that "Brown has a special honesty in his voice."

AllMusic praised "Black Top's superb house horn section." The Grove Press Guide to the Blues on CD noted that "Brown's voice strains at times," but advised listeners to "indulge the tall fellow his occasional PG-13 naughtiness." The Rolling Stone Album Guide stated that "Brown is in great, gruff voice."

== Track listing ==
| No. | Title | Length |
|---|---|---|
| 1. | "Have Mercy, Mercy Baby!" |
| 2. | "Dirty Work" |
| 3. | "I'm With You All the Way" |
| 4. | "Something Gonna Jump Out the Bushes" |
| 5. | "You Mean More to Me Than Gold" |
| 6. | "Flamingo" |
| 7. | "My Jug and I" |
| 8. | "Life's Ups and Downs" |
| 9. | "Your Love Is Real" |
| 10. | "You Were a Long Time Coming" |
| 11. | "Nothing Takes the Place of You" |
| 12. | "I'm Walking Out on You" |
