= Cumbersome =

1995 single by Seven Mary Three

Single by Seven Mary Three

from the album American Standard
- Released: August 1, 1995
- Studio: Morrisound Recording (Tampa, Florida)
- Genre: Post-grunge; alternative rock
- Length: 3:59
- Label: Mammoth; Atlantic
- Songwriters: Jason Ross; Jason Pollock
- Producers: Jason Ross; Jason Pollock; Tom Morris

Seven Mary Three singles chronology
"Cumbersome" (1995)	"Water's Edge" (1996)

Music video
- "Cumbersome" on YouTube

"Cumbersome" is a song by American rock band Seven Mary Three, released as the lead single from their second studio album, American Standard (1995). It was originally included on their independently released debut, Churn, in 1994. The single was serviced to US rock radio on August 1, 1995, and became the band's most popular and well-known song, reaching number one on the US Billboard Album Rock Tracks chart, number seven on the Billboard Modern Rock Tracks chart, and number 39 on the Billboard Hot 100. An acoustic version of the song is included on the "Cumbersome" and "Water's Edge" CD singles. A live version appears on Live in the X Lounge IV, released in 2001.

== Background ==
The original six-minute version of "Cumbersome" served as the opening track to Churn. After airing on a Florida radio station and generating a great response, the song propelled Seven Mary Three to a record deal with Mammoth Records. The band then re-recorded "Cumbersome" for their Mammoth label debut album, American Standard, and the song catapulted the album to platinum status.

In a 1996 interview, Jason Pollock said the overriding theme on the songs from American Standard "is one of people dealing with things in life, dealing with your feelings, dealing with your fellow man, dealing with women ... and how you really have to work at it."

== Music and lyrics ==
The lyrics describe regret over a couple's separation, particularly a woman's disinterest in her significant other. It also arguably highlights the group's songwriting abilities. The song opens with guitar chords which are strummed conventionally and then strummed muted between every chord transition. This pattern carries on throughout the song. A prominent bassline is highlighted during the bridge.

== Legacy ==
Despite proving commercially successful, as the band's debut single and most popular song, "Cumbersome" has, according to some observers, pigeon-holed Seven Mary Three among the one-hit wonders of the 1990s. In a 2005 interview, drummer Giti Khalsa called the song "a blessing and a curse." He added, "It definitely was the beginning of our success. We were able to sell a lot of records because of that song and a couple of others on that first record. But, at the same time, with each record that we've made - it's like the 'monkey on the back.'" This was reinforced in 2003 when the band opened for 3 Doors Down on tour. The latter group, having surpassed Seven Mary Three in popularity, claimed to have covered "Cumbersome" among other Seven Mary Three songs during their early days. Khalsa also expressed disappointment in a 2003 interview where he stated that a considerable number of people leave their shows after "Cumbersome" is performed.

As of 2021, "Cumbersome" allegedly receives over 150 plays a week on popular radio.

== Music video ==
The "Cumbersome" video was produced by MMG and directed by Julie Hermelin. A stripped-down performance video with little-to-no story concept or special effects; it revolves entirely around the band playing the song in a bar during the day.

== Track listings ==
1. "Cumbersome" (LP version)
2. "Cumbersome" (acoustic version)

== Charts ==
=== Weekly charts ===
Chart (1995–1996)	Peak position
Australia (ARIA)	80
Canada Rock/Alternative (RPM)	8
New Zealand (Recorded Music NZ)	31
US Billboard Hot 100	39
US Album Rock Tracks (Billboard)	1
US Modern Rock Tracks (Billboard)	7

=== Year-end charts ===
Chart (1996)	Position
US Mainstream Rock Tracks (Billboard)	5
US Modern Rock Tracks (Billboard)	27

== Release history ==
Region	Date	Format(s)	Label(s)	Ref(s).
United States	August 1, 1995	Album rock; modern rock radio	Mammoth; Atlantic	
United States	January 15–16, 1996	Contemporary hit radio	Mammoth; Atlantic	
United Kingdom	April 15, 1996	CD; cassette	Mammoth; Atlantic	
