= Crazy/Beautiful =

2001 film by John Stockwell

- Theatrical release poster
- Directed by: John Stockwell
- Written by: Phil Hay; Matt Manfredi
- Produced by: Rachel Pfeffer; Harry J. Ufland; Mary Jane Ufland
- Starring: Kirsten Dunst; Jay Hernandez; Bruce Davison
- Cinematography: Shane Hurlbut
- Edited by: Melissa Kent
- Music by: Paul Haslinger
- Production company: Touchstone Pictures
- Distributed by: Buena Vista Pictures Distribution
- Release date: June 29, 2001
- Running time: 99 minutes
- Country: United States
- Language: English
- Budget: $13 million
- Box office: $19.9 million

Crazy/Beautiful (stylized as crazy/beautiful) is a 2001 American teen romantic drama film starring Kirsten Dunst and Jay Hernandez (in his film debut). It is largely set at Palisades Charter High School and the surrounding area, including Downtown Los Angeles, Pacific Palisades, Malibu, and East Los Angeles.

Poor Latino Carlos Nuñez and the troubled congressman's daughter Nicole Oakley inadvertently meet far from their school, Pacific Palisades High, and soon form an unlikely relationship despite others' opposition.

The film was released by Buena Vista Pictures Distribution on June 29, 2001, to mostly favorable reviews and modestly recovered its production budget.

== Plot ==
Carlos Nuñez is a 17-year-old Mexican-American teen from East LA who rides a bus two hours every day to attend school in the Pacific Palisades for a better education. A straight-A student, he hopes to attend the U.S. Naval Academy and become a pilot.

On a day out with friends at the Santa Monica Pier, Carlos meets Nicole Oakley, a classmate who is doing trash pickup at the beach as part of a DUI sentence. She is the daughter of a US congressman and lives in the upscale Palisades, but she is rebellious, hard-partying, and has a strained relationship with her father. Nicole's troubles stem from her mother's suicide when she was young, as well as the feeling of being unwanted by her father and his new wife. Despite their differences, Nicole and Carlos begin a romantic relationship.

The romance runs into obstacles that arise from their different backgrounds, as when Carlos invites Nicole to a family party and she feels out-of-place as the only white person there. She pulls a stunt that lands them both in detention; and when she tells him to lighten up, he angrily points out that she does not appreciate the privileges she has. Despite the obstacles, their relationship blossoms. Carlos tries to steer Nicole away from her drug and alcohol abuse, and she arranges a flying lesson for him, who dreams of being a pilot but has never been in a plane.

Nicole's father offers to help Carlos with his Congressional sponsorship to the Naval Academy, but cautions against dating his daughter because he does not want to see him dragged down by her. Carlos's friends and family also look down on the relationship, fearing Nicole is a bad influence on him.

Feeling pressure from other peoples' expectations, Carlos breaks up with Nicole, sending her spiraling back into wild, drunken partying. One night, Carlos calls her and finds out she is getting drunk at a high school party. He goes to the party and saves her from a boy trying to take advantage of her. He drives her home, but they are stopped by the police.

As a result of this incident, Nicole's father and stepmother decide that she needs to go to a boarding school far from home. Carlos rescues Nicole and they run away together. While they are away, Nicole realizes she is obstructing Carlos's dreams, so decides it is time to face her problems so she can be better for Carlos and have a future with him. They return to her home, where Nicole not only defies her stepmother's orders, but also makes up with her father, who thanks Carlos for not listening to his advice to abandon her. As the film ends, Carlos is shown becoming a pilot with the United States Navy.

== Cast ==
- Kirsten Dunst as Nicole
- Jay Hernandez as Carlos
- Lucinda Jenney as Courtney
- Taryn Manning as Maddy
- Rolando Molina as Hector
- Bruce Davison as Tom Oakley

== Production ==
Crazy/Beautiful was directed by John Stockwell, who was interested in casting actress Kirsten Dunst as a self-destructive teenager after seeing her role in The Virgin Suicides. Dunst accepted the role because she was tired of playing "sweet" girls. She also helped Stockwell convince Disney executives not to tone down the film's language and adult themes. Although a nude scene was in the script, it was never filmed because Dunst was 17 years old when she was cast and her mother flatly refused to let her appear nude. The film was originally titled "At Seventeen".

Due to an FCC warning to film studios for showing "unwholesome content [to] kids", Touchstone Pictures mandated significant edits to John Stockwell's final cut. Though Crazy/Beautiful was planned as an R-rated film, in an effort to secure a commercial PG-13 rating, Disney ordered Stockwell to cut 35 obscenities, including a sex scene and scenes of Nicole drinking and using drugs. Of the cuts, Stockwell said, "We were trying to make a cautionary tale, and we couldn't show the behavior we were trying to caution people away from.”

== Reception ==
=== Box office ===
In the United States and Canada, Crazy/Beautiful grossed $16.9 million, with $3.0 million in other territories, for a worldwide total of $19.9 million, against a budget of $13 million. It opened at No. 9 its first weekend, its only week in the Top 10 at the domestic box office.

=== Critical response ===
On the review aggregator website Rotten Tomatoes, 62% of 98 critics' reviews are positive, with an average rating of 5.6/10. The website's consensus reads: "The story is not new, but the film gets credit for trying to move away from the genre's cliches. Kirsten Dunst and newcomer Jay Hernandez give believable performances." Metacritic, which uses a weighted average, assigned the film a score of 61 out of 100, based on 26 critics, indicating "generally favorable" reviews. Audiences polled by CinemaScore gave the film a grade B on scale of A to F.

The leads' acting was chiefly praised, with many critics saying it gave Dunst the opportunity to show her range as an actress. In a three-star review, Roger Ebert wrote Crazy/Beautiful "is an unusually observant film about adolescence," and that Dunst and Hernandez bring "real conviction to the roles, [so] we care about them as people, not case studies."

Stephanie Zacharek of Salon wrote, "[Dunst's] performance cuts deep...What’s so painful, and so moving, about her performance is that she's bracingly alive every minute. Her self-inflicted numbness is a defense against suffering, but not a solution to it. And when she looks into Carlos' eyes, she gives the sense of, momentarily at least, seeing her way clear." The Greensboro News & Record said Hernandez "manages to register such traits as honesty and integrity without being stuffy about it. That's not as easy as it might look."

The film was also positively cited by critics for its handling of racial and cultural dynamics. "This is a classic love story, but one that's not afraid to take a few jabs at the cluelessness of goodhearted liberals who, despite their admirable intentions, can never quite grasp how the other half lives," Zacharek wrote.

The New York Times critic A. O. Scott praised the lead actors and the film's lively soundtrack, but criticized the writing of other characters as flat and superficial. He concluded that Crazy/Beautiful is "an enormous improvement over the brainless, patronizing teenage romances" of the time, but also said it could have been much better if the filmmakers "had trusted themselves and the actors a bit more".

== Soundtrack ==
Crazy/Beautiful

Soundtrack album by Various Artists
- Released: June 26, 2001
- Genres: Alternative rock, indie rock, Latin
- Length: 1:00:28
- Label: Hollywood Records

Singles from Crazy/Beautiful
- 1. "Wait" Released: June 5, 2001; 2. "Siempre (Everytime)" Released: 2001

The soundtrack album was released by Hollywood Records on June 26, 2001. Seven Mary Three's "Wait" served as the album's English lead single, and was featured on their fifth studio album, The Economy of Sound, while La Ley's "Siempre (Everytime)" was its Spanish lead single. The music video for "Wait" was also directed by John Stockwell and featured Dunst and Hernandez. David Gray's song "This Year's Love" is featured in the film but is not included on the soundtrack. Amazon.com editorialist Rickey Wright gave a mixed review of the soundtrack, citing groups like The Dandy Warhols, Mellow Man Ace, and Delinquent Habits as "evocative" while also stating that it "hardly makes a good argument for the continuing validity of guitar rock."

No.	Title	Length
1.	"Ten la Fe" (Mellow Man Ace)	4:01
2.	"Who Am I?" (Lily Frost)	3:06
3.	"To Be Free" (Emiliana Torrini)	3:25
4.	"Wait" (Seven Mary Three)	3:07
5.	"Every Time" (La Ley)	3:59
6.	"La Reina del Lugar" (Serralde)	4:23
7.	"Shattered" (Remy Zero)	3:47
8.	"Boulevard Star" (Delinquent Habits)	3:29
9.	"This Is Not My Life" (Fastball)	3:03
10.	"Sumpin" (The Pimps)	3:51
11.	"Alright" (Osker)	1:43
12.	"Sleep" (The Dandy Warhols)	6:03
13.	"She Gave Me Love" (The Getaway People)	3:59
14.	"I Want to Believe You" (Lori Carson & Paul Haslinger)	4:34
15.	"Perfect" (Maren Ord)	3:49
16.	"Siempre (Everytime)" (La Ley)	4:07
Total length:		1:00:28

== Home media ==
Crazy/Beautiful was released on DVD on November 13, 2001, by Buena Vista Home Entertainment (under the Touchstone Home Video banner).
