= Long Time Coming (Nappy Brown album) =

Studio album by Nappy Brown
- Released: 2007
- Genre: Blues, R&B
- Label: Blind Pig
- Producer: Scott Cable

Nappy Brown chronology
Best of Both Worlds (1998)	Long Time Coming (2007)

Long Time Coming is an album by the American musician Nappy Brown, released in 2007. It was nominated for a Blues Music Award for "Traditional Blues Album of the Year". Released by Blind Pig Records, Long Time Coming was Brown's final album; he died in September 2008.

== Production ==
Produced by Scott Cable, the album was recorded in May 2007, primarily in Kernersville, North Carolina. Brown did not have a large recording budget, so Cable mostly relied on favors from the backing musicians. "Cherry Red" is a cover of the song made famous by Eddie "Cleanhead" Vinson. "Keep On Pleasin' You" is a version of a song Brown cut for Savoy Records. "Don't Be Angry" is a reprise of Brown's biggest hit. "Take Care of Me" is a gospel song; Brown was initially hesitant to include it on the blues and R&B-heavy Long Time Coming. Junior Watson, Bob Margolin, and Sean Costello were among the guitar players on the album.

== Critical reception ==
Professional ratings
Review scores
Source	Rating
AllMusic	4.5/5 stars
Boston Herald	A
Orlando Sentinel	4/5 stars
Philadelphia Daily News	A

The Charleston Daily Mail wrote that, "having sung everything from jubilee gospel to rocking R&B, 78-year-old Brown effortlessly rummages through various blues styles." The Philadelphia Daily News opined that "this rascally showman is a hoot and a half." The Orlando Sentinel stated: "With its muscular piano foundation and simple rhythm section, 'Take Care of Me' emerges as a showcase for Brown's ability to meld the tender and the tough with his powerful vocals." The Washington Post determined that Brown "belts out jump tunes with the kind of robust authority the genre demands, delivers romantic ballad with crooning finesse and fully reveals his gospel roots when the spirit moves him."

== Track listing ==
No.	Title	Length
1.	"Keep On Pleasin' You"
2.	"You Were a Long Time Coming"
3.	"Don't Be Angry"
4.	"Give Me Your Love"
5.	"That Man"
6.	"Right Time"
7.	"Who"
8.	"Cherry Red"
9.	"Aw Shucks, Baby"
10.	"Every Shut Eye Ain't Sleepin'"
11.	"Bye Bye Baby"
12.	"Take Care of Me"
