= The Hard Way (Tinsley Ellis album) =

Studio album by Tinsley Ellis
- Released: 2004
- Genre: Blues
- Label: Telarc International Corporation
- Producer: Tinsley Ellis

Tinsley Ellis chronology
Hell or High Water (2002)	The Hard Way (2004)	Live:Highwayman (2005)

Professional ratings
Review scores
Source	Rating
AllMusic	4/5 stars
The Penguin Guide to Blues Recordings	2/4 stars

The Hard Way is a 2004 blues album by Tinsley Ellis. It was recorded and mixed at Stonehenge at ZAC Atlanta, Georgia, engineered and mixed by Jimmy Zumpano, mastered by Rodney Mills and produced by Tinsley Ellis with Robert Woods as executive producer. Tinsley wrote all songs except for "Still in the Game" and "Me Without You".

== Track listing ==
1. "Still in the Game"
2. "Let Him Down Easy"
3. "Me Without You"
4. "I'll Get Over You"
5. "And It Hurts"
6. "La La Land"
7. "My Love's the Medicine"
8. "Fountain of Youth"
9. "Love Bomb"
10. "Her Other Man"
11. "Pack Poet"
12. "The Last Song"

== Musicians ==
- Tinsley Ellis – guitar, vocals
- The Evil One – bass guitar
- Oliver Wood – guitar
- Richie Hayward and Wes Johnson – drums
- Kevin McKendree – keyboards
- Count M'butu – congas, bongos, shaker
- Adam Mewheter – trombone
- Marcus James – saxophone, tambourine
- Sean Costello – harmonica
- Lola Gulley, Donna Hopkins, Vickie Salz – background vocals
