= Wait (Seven Mary Three song) =

Single by Seven Mary Three

from the album The Economy of Sound/Crazy/Beautiful
- Released: June 2001; November 20, 2001(Australia)
- Recorded: Morrisound Recording in Tampa, FL and Transcontinental Studios in Orlando, FL
- Genre: Post-grunge, hard rock
- Length: 3:08
- Label: Mammoth/Hollywood
- Songwriter: Jason Ross
- Producers: Jason Ross, Tom Morris, Neal Avron

Seven Mary Three singles chronology
| "Each Little Mystery" (1998) | "Wait" (2001) | "Sleepwalking" (2001) |

"Wait" is a song by Seven Mary Three and the lead single from their fifth studio album, The Economy of Sound, released on June 5, 2001. It also served as the English lead single to the Crazy/Beautiful film soundtrack released three weeks later (La Ley's "Every Time/Siempre" was its Spanish lead single). "Wait" has since become one of the band's most popular songs, having reached #7 on Billboard's Mainstream Rock Tracks. It also entered radio as the #1 Most Added record of the format in its first two weeks.

== Overview ==
Stylistically, "Wait" is a slight detour from Seven Mary Three's early post-grunge hits. Its chorus features wailing vocals in an upbeat melody reminiscent of the 1970 hit "Signs." Characteristic of many Seven Mary Three singles, its mid-tempo verses also feature prominent guitar harmonics and a softness that builds into the aggressive and vibrant chorus. Lyrically, "Wait" deals with the realization of time wasted, taking life's luxuries for granted, and the narrator's subsequent wisdom gained through his or her experiences.

Along with much of the Crazy/Beautiful soundtrack, "Wait" was criticized by Amazon.com editorialist Rickey Wright as a potential "Goo Goo Dolls knockoff or a Bon Jovi homage." However, John Duffy of AllMusic described the song as "catchy" and noted it among the "focused hooks" of The Economy of Sound.

== Music videos ==
Two videos were produced for "Wait." The initial version was directed by Crazy/Beautiful director John Stockwell under Planet, Inc. Shot in Los Angeles in May 2001, it features the film's principals Kirsten Dunst and Jay Hernandez and debuted on June 18, 2001. The second version of "Wait" is simply a concert performance of the song which retains the live audio.

== Chart positions ==
| Chart | Peak position | Year |
|---|---|---|
| Billboard Modern Rock Tracks | 21 | 2001 |
| Billboard Mainstream Rock Tracks | 7 | 2001 |
