= Moment of Truth (Tinsley Ellis album) =

Studio album by Tinsley Ellis
- Released: 2007
- Recorded: Tony Terrebonne
- Genre: Blues
- Label: Alligator Records
- Producer: Tinsley Ellis

Tinsley Ellis chronology
Live:Highwayman (2005)	Moment of Truth (2007)	Speak No Evil (2009)

Moment of Truth is a 2007 blues album by Tinsley Ellis. It was recorded by Tony Terrebonne, mixed by Sam Fishkin, mastered by Dan Stout and produced by Tinsley Ellis with Bruce Iglauer and Tim Kolleth as executive producers. Tinsley wrote all but two of the songs.

== Track listing ==
All songs written by Tinsley Ellis, except where indicated.

1. "Say Too Much"
2. "Somebody"
3. "Get to the Bottom"
4. "You're Gonna Thank Me"
5. "Tell the Truth"
6. "Too Much of Everything"
7. "Bringin' Home the Bacon"
8. "Freeway Soul"
9. "I Take What I Want" (Isaac Hayes, David Porter, Mabon "Teenie" Hodges)
10. "Sleep On It"
11. "Stare at the Sun"
12. "Shadow of a Doubt" (Gary Nicholson)

== Musicians ==
- Tinsley Ellis on guitar and vocals
- The Evil One on bass guitar
- Jeff Burch on drums
- Kevin McKendree on keyboards
- Mike Lowry on guitar
- Michelle Malone on background vocals (track 5)
