= Dis/Location =

Studio album by Seven Mary Three
- Released: May 11, 2004
- Recorded: January 2004 at Chase Park Transduction and Andy Barker's Studio in Athens, GA, and Radiostar Studios in Weed, CA
- Genre: Rock, post-grunge
- Length: 38:53
- Label: DRT
- Producer: Jason Ross; Thomas Juliano; Brian Paulson, Sylvia Massy

Seven Mary Three chronology
Welcome Race Fans (2003)	Dis/Location (2004)	Day & Nightdriving (2008)

Professional ratings
Review scores
Source	Rating
Allmusic	2.5/5 stars

Dis/Location is the sixth studio album by American post-grunge band Seven Mary Three. It was released on May 11, 2004 on DRT Entertainment.

The album's only single was "Without You Feels".

== Track listing ==
All songs written by Jason Ross and Thomas Juliano, except where noted.

No.	Title	Length
1.	"Settle Up" (Ross, Juliano, Daniel)	2:17
2.	"Without You Feels"	3:48
3.	"Oceans of Envy"	3:08
4.	"Bark No Bite"	2:56
5.	"Blue Letter"	3:29
6.	"Found My Center"	4:10
7.	"By Your Side" (Ross)	3:59
8.	"Dislocated"	2:58
9.	"Made To Be Broken"	3:18
10.	"Where Are You Calling From?"	4:38
11.	"Subway Tunnel Microphones"	3:47

== Personnel ==
- Jason Ross – lead vocals, rhythm guitar
- Thomas Juliano – lead guitar, backing vocals
- Casey Daniel – bass
- Giti Khalsa – drums

=== Production ===
- Producers – Jason Ross, Thomas Juliano, and Brian Paulson, except "Without You Feels" produced by Sylvia Massy, Jason Ross, and Thomas Juliano
- Engineering – Brian Paulson, except "Without You Feels" engineered by Sylvia Massy
- Mixing – Brian Paulson, except "Without You Feels" mixed by Sylvia Massy
- Mastering – UE Nastasi
- Art Direction – Lane Wurster
- Graphic Design – Phillip Dwyer
- Photography – Michael Traister, Martin Bennett, and Sam Mitcham
