= Orange Ave. =

Studio album by Seven Mary Three
- Released: July 14, 1998
- Recorded: February 1998 – March 1998 at Ardent Studios in Memphis, TN and Morrisound Recording in Tampa, FL
- Genre: Rock, post-grunge
- Length: 47:27
- Label: Atlantic
- Producer: Tom Morris; Jason Pollock; Jason Ross

Seven Mary Three chronology
B-Sides & Rarities (1997)	Orange Ave. (1998)	The Economy of Sound (2001)

Singles from Orange Ave.
- 1. "Over Your Shoulder" Released: 1998; 2. "Each Little Mystery" Released: 1998

Professional ratings
Review scores
Source	Rating
AllMusic	2.5/5 stars
The Encyclopedia of Popular Music	2/5 stars
MusicHound Rock: The Essential Album Guide	2.5/5 stars
Rock Hard	8/10

Orange Ave. is the fourth studio album by American post-grunge band Seven Mary Three. It was released on July 14, 1998, on Atlantic Records. The album peaked at No. 121 on the Billboard 200. The album is named after a street running through downtown Orlando, Florida, the band's hometown.

The album's only Billboard-charting single was "Over Your Shoulder" (No. 7 on Hot Mainstream Rock Tracks and No. 16 on Hot Modern Rock Tracks). "Each Little Mystery" was also released as a single, but did not chart.

== Critical reception ==
The A.V. Club wrote that "though Seven Mary Three still won't be mistaken for a creative dynamo—its diversity generally means there's a wider variety of forgettable rock songs from which to choose on Orange Ave.—it's certainly not so difficult to endure, sort of like the work of an accomplished but underwhelming bar band." The Sun Sentinel wrote that "by forgetting trends and focusing on their own experience, Seven Mary Three has made Orange Ave. a dark horse contender for the year's best rock album."

== Track listing ==
All songs written and arranged by Seven Mary Three.

1. "Peel" – 2:08
2. "Over Your Shoulder" – 4:18
3. "Chasing You" – 3:38
4. "Each Little Mystery" – 2:45
5. "In-Between" – 3:09
6. "Joliet" – 4:20
7. "Super-Related" – 3:24
8. "Flagship Eleanor" – 3:01
9. "Southwestern State" – 4:41
10. "Hang On" – 2:58
11. "Blessing In Disguise" – 4:33
12. "Devil's Holy Joke" – 8:18
  - "Devil's Holy Joke" ends at 3:20, followed by the hidden track "Talk to You Like That" beginning at 4:16.

== Album credits ==
- Jason Ross – lead vocals, rhythm guitar
- Jason Pollock – lead guitar, backing vocals
- Casey Daniel – bass
- Giti Khalsa – drums
- Kevin McKendree – keyboards
- Paul Smith – additional guitar

=== Production ===
- Producers: Tom Morris, Jason Pollock, and Jason Ross
- Engineering: Tom Morris with Matt Martone
- Mixing: Tom Morris, except Tracks 3 and 5 mixed by Jack Joseph Puig
- Mastering: Mike Fuller and Tom Morris
- Art Direction: Larry Freemantle and Seven Mary Three
- Photography: Danny Clinch
