= Mikael Santana =

Blues musician from USA

- Also known as: "Cool Daddy"
- Born: Angel Enrique Santana y Cathcart; December 31, 1957 (age 67); Lakeland, Florida, United States
- Genres: Chicago blues Jump blues Swing music
- Occupation: Musician
- Instrument(s): Harmonica vocals
- Years active: 1990s–present
- Labels: North Magnolia Music
- Past members: Chris Chatfield, Tommy Love, Steve Earnshaw, Mike Karcz, Takeshi Imura, Tom Janzen, Al Rollag, Jason M. Vawter, Chuck Sullivan
- Website: mikesantana.com

Mikael Santana (born December 31, 1957) is an American blues harmonica player and singer-songwriter, who blends the Chicago blues style with jump blues and West Coast swing. He lives in Memphis, Tennessee.

== Early years ==
Mikael Santana was born in Lakeland, Florida, United States, and lived in Miami from 1960 to 1972. His mother worked as a ticket agent for an airline, enabling the family to travel extensively. Thus, by the time he had reached his early teens Santana had traveled to Bolivia, Chile, Guatemala, Peru, Brazil, Paraguay, Spain, and Portugal. His parents divorced in 1972; and along with his mother, sister, and brother, he moved to Nashville, Tennessee, all of them living with his grandparents until his mother finished her teaching degree. Having graduated, his mother took a job teaching at Dyersburg Senior High School in Dyersburg, Tennessee. Santana did his senior year of high school there (graduating in 1976), and then returned to Miami.

For six years, Santana worked at a variety of jobs (short-order cook, apprentice carpenter, clerk in a bookstore) before enlisting in the U.S. Army in 1982. During his stay in the Army, Santana studied the Mandarin Chinese language at the Defense Language Institute in Monterey, California. Upon completion of language school, he was assigned to his permanent duty station at Fort Bragg, North Carolina. While at Ft. Bragg, he received an associate degree in General Aeronautics from Embry–Riddle Aeronautical University. In 1986, he was received into the Greek Orthodox Church, taking the name of St. Mikael the Archangel. He was discharged from the Army in 1987.

== Crossroads ==
Upon leaving the Army, Santana returned to Miami, where he studied massage therapy and briefly worked as a masseur at a Miami Beach hotel. Moving to Milwaukee, Wisconsin; it was there that he watched the film, Crossroads, inspiring him to take up the study of the blues harmonica.

Santana moved back to Dyersburg, Tennessee in 1988, and for the next three years studied Medical Laboratory Science at Jackson State Community College. During this time he studied the recordings of such Blues harmonica masters as James Cotton, Little Walter, and Sonny Boy Williamson II and within two years he was serving an apprenticeship under the tutelage of Butch Mudbone on Beale Street in Memphis, Tennessee.

After graduating from college Santana moved permanently to Memphis, and with encouragement from Mudbone, went on to develop his skills as a frontman. Eventually he met guitarist Al Rollag, with whom he formed the band Metropolitan Avenue (along with Steve Earnshaw (electric bass) and drummer Mike Karcz). Using a repertoire built on the traditional Chicago blues style, Metropolitan Avenue incorporated into its sound the jazz, jump blues, and West Coast swing elements of Big Joe and the Dynaflows, Charlie Musselwhite, Rod Piazza and the Mighty Flyers, and William Clarke.

== Performing ==
After the release of In Transit, Santana formed The Mikael Santana Band, and using The Black Diamond Club on Beale Street in Memphis as their base of operations, they regularly gigged there as headliners, or opened up for such blues musicians as Little Jimmy King, Blind Mississippi Morris, Studebaker John, Sean Costello, and Anson Funderburgh with Sam Myers. On June 2, 2000, they opened for B.B. King at the B.B. King Homecoming in Indianola, Mississippi.

Metropolitan Avenue reformed in Memphis in 2012 featuring Chuck Sullivan (bass), Al Rollag (guitar), and Jason M. Vawter (drums). The band played around town off and on for another decade with various guitarists. They recorded an unreleased album of Santana's original songs in 2016 tentatively titled "Meet Me at Midnight" with Chris Chatfield on guitar.

== Discography ==
- Point of Departure (1997)
- In Transit (1998)
- Night Flight (2000)
