= Speak No Evil (Tinsley Ellis album) =

Studio album by Tinsley Ellis
- Released: October 6, 2009
- Recorded: Jim Z
- Genre: Blues
- Length: 54:33
- Label: Alligator Records
- Producer: Tinsley Ellis

Tinsley Ellis chronology
Moment of Truth (2007)	Speak No Evil (2009)	Get It! (2013)

Speak No Evil is a 2009 blues album by Tinsley Ellis. It was recorded and mixed by Jim Z and Tony Terrebonne with Matt Pool assisting at Stonehenge at Zac Recording in Atlanta, Georgia. It was mastered by Rodney Mills at Rodney Mills Master House, Duluth, Georgia, and produced by Tinsley Ellis with Bruce Iglauer as executive producer. Tinsley wrote all of the songs on the album.

== Track listing ==
No.	Title	Length
1.	"Sunlight of Love"	4:15
2.	"Slip and Fall"	3:59
3.	"Speak No Evil"	5:08
4.	"It Takes What It Takes"	6:00
5.	"The Other Side"	4:14
6.	"The Night Is Easy"	4:13
7.	"Left of Your Mind"	3:44
8.	"Cold Love, Hot Night"	4:19
9.	"Amanda"	4:22
10.	"Loving for Today"	6:02
11.	"Grow a Pair"	4:30
12.	"Rockslide"	3:47

== Musicians ==
- Tinsley Ellis on guitar and vocals
- The Evil One on bass guitar
- Jeff Burch on drums
- Kevin McKendree on keyboards
- Pete Orenstein on keyboards
