= Live:Highwayman =

Live album by Tinsley Ellis
- Released: 2005
- Recorded: Timothy Powell
- Genre: Blues
- Length: 79:07
- Producer: Tinsley Ellis, Bruce Iglauer

Tinsley Ellis chronology
The Hard Way (2004)	Live:Highwayman (2005)	Moment of Truth (2007)

Professional ratings
Review scores
Source	Rating
AllMusic	4/5 stars
The Penguin Guide to Blues Recordings	2.5/4 stars

Live:Highwayman is a 2005 blues album by Tinsley Ellis. It was recorded live at the Chord On Blues Blues Club in St. Charles, Illinois, by Timothy Powell for Metro Mobile Recording, mixed by Sam Fishkin and live performance location sound mixing by Ron Willhoff. It was mastered by Dan Stout and Bruce Iglauer and produced by Tinsley Ellis and Bruce Iglauer. Tinsley wrote or co-wrote seven of the songs on the album.

== Track listing ==
1. "To the Devil for a Dime"
2. "Highwayman"
3. "A Quitter Never Wins"
4. "Real Bad Way"
5. "Hell or High Water"
6. "The Next Miss Wrong"
7. "The Last Song"
8. "Leavin' Here"
9. "Pawnbroker"
10. "The Axe"
11. "Double Eyed Whammy"

== Musicians ==
- Tinsley Ellis on guitar and vocals
- The Evil One on bass guitar and background vocals
- Jeff Burch on drums
- Todd Hamric on keyboards and background vocals
