= Churn (Seven Mary Three album) =

Studio album by Seven Mary Three
- Released: 1994
- Recorded: 1994 at Dream Sequence Music Studios
- Genre: Rock, post-grunge
- Length: 50:45
- Label: 5 Spot Records
- Producer: Seven Mary Three; Kevin McNoldy

Seven Mary Three chronology
Churn (1994)	American Standard (1995)

Alternative cover
- The cover of the re-released version of Churn.

Churn is the debut studio album by American post-grunge band Seven Mary Three. It was independently released and preceded the band's mainstream breakthrough, American Standard. Churn also included two songs that would be re-recorded and go on to be among Seven Mary Three's biggest singles. Of all the songs on the album, "Kater" was the only one that wasn't re-recorded for the band's major label debut, as the band sold the song off to a Chapel Hill based band called Stuntcock, who intended to release their own version of it as 'Casey the Madison King", though it is unknown if that ever came to fruition. The album was re-released several years later with different album artwork. It was again re-released on December 9, 2008 via digital music sellers and the band's website.

== Track listing ==
All songs written and arranged by Seven Mary Three.

1. "Cumbersome" – 6:03
2. "Water's Edge" – 5:13
3. "Devil Boy" – 5:16
4. "Roderigo" – 5:19
5. "Lame" – 5:03
6. "Kater" – 5:59
7. "Margarette" – 5:01
8. "Anything" – 5:11
9. "Punch in Punch Out" – 2:12
10. "Favorite Dog" – 5:27

== Album credits ==
- Jason Ross – lead vocals, rhythm guitar
- Jason Pollock – lead guitar, backing vocals
- Casey Daniel – bass
- Giti Khalsa – drums
- Virginia Martin – violin on "Anything"

=== Production ===
- Producers: Seven Mary Three and Kevin McNoldy
- Executive Producers: Seven Mary Three and Mike Moran
- Engineering: Kevin McNoldy
- Assistant Engineer: Brandon Goldthwaite
- Mixing: Kevin McNoldy
- Art Direction: Aaron Norfolk, Jason Ross, and Jason Pollock
- Photography: Aaron Norfolk
