= American Standard (Seven Mary Three album) =

Studio album by Seven Mary Three
- Released: September 5, 1995
- Recorded: June – July 1995 at Morrisound Recording in Tampa, FL
- Genres: Post-grunge; alternative rock
- Length: 46:15
- Label: Mammoth
- Producers: Jason Ross; Jason Pollock; Tom Morris

Seven Mary Three chronology
| Churn (1994) | American Standard (1995) | RockCrown (1997) |

Singles from American Standard
- 1. "Cumbersome" Released: January 9, 1996; 2. "Water's Edge" Released: 1996; 3. "My My" Released: 1996

Professional ratings
Review scores
| Source | Rating |
|---|---|
| AllMusic | 4/5 stars |
| The Encyclopedia of Popular Music | 3/5 stars |
| Kerrang! | 4/5 stars |
| MusicHound Rock | 3/5 stars |

American Standard is the second studio album by American post-grunge band Seven Mary Three. It was released on September 5, 1995, on Mammoth Records. The album would be Seven Mary Three's breakthrough success, rising to number 24 on the Billboard 200 and was certified platinum in the United States and Canada. Many of the songs were rerecorded versions of tracks off Seven Mary Three's independent debut, Churn.

== Overview ==
The album's biggest hit single was "Cumbersome" (#1 on Billboard's Hot Mainstream Rock Tracks, #7 on Hot Modern Rock Tracks, and #39 on the Billboard Hot 100). Other Billboard-charting singles were "Water's Edge" (#7 on Hot Mainstream Rock Tracks and #37 on Hot Modern Rock Tracks), and "My My" (#19 on Hot Mainstream Rock Tracks).

=== Vinyl release ===
On April 13, 2019, in conjunction with Record Store Day, American Standard was released on vinyl record for the first time. Wardog Records produced a limited edition of 800 black vinyl copies and 200 yellow vinyl copies.

== Track listing ==
All tracks are written by Jason Ross and Jason Pollock, except where noted.

| No. | Title | Length |
|---|---|---|
| 1. | "Water's Edge" | 3:52 |
| 2. | "Cumbersome" | 3:59 |
| 3. | "Roderigo" | 4:24 |
| 4. | "Devil Boy" | 4:24 |
| 5. | "My My" | 2:52 |
| 6. | "Lame" | 4:52 |
| 7. | "Headstrong" (Casey Daniel, Ross, Pollock) | 4:46 |
| 8. | "Anything" | 3:40 |
| 9. | "Margaret" | 3:42 |
| 10. | "Punch In Punch Out" (Giti Khalsa, Ross) | 2:48 |
| 11. | "Favorite Dog" | 6:51 |

== Personnel ==
Adapted from the liner notes of American Standard.

Seven Mary Three

- Jason Ross – lead vocals, rhythm guitar
- Jason Pollock – lead guitar, backing vocals
- Casey Daniel – bass
- Giti Khalsa – drums

Production

- Producers: Jason Ross, Jason Pollock, and Tom Morris
- Engineering: Tom Morris and Brian Benscoter
- Mixing: Tom Morris
- Mastering: Tom Morris
- Art Direction: Lane Wurster and Seven Mary Three
- Graphic Design: Chris Eselgroth
- Photography: Ben Gray
- Additional Photography: Alex Tremi
- Cover Photograph: Suzanne Opton/Swanstock

== Charts ==
=== Weekly charts ===
| Chart (1996) | Peak position |
|---|---|
| Canada Top Albums/CDs (RPM) | 39 |
| New Zealand Albums (RMNZ) | 21 |
| US Billboard 200 | 24 |

=== Year-end charts ===
| Chart (1996) | Position |
|---|---|
| US Billboard 200 | 63 |

== Certifications ==
| Region | Certification | Certified units/sales |
|---|---|---|
| Canada (Music Canada) | Platinum | 100,000^{^} |
| United States (RIAA) | Platinum | 1,000,000^{^} |
^{^} Shipments figures based on certification alone.
