= Hell or High Water (Tinsley Ellis album) =

Studio album by Tinsley Ellis
- Released: 2002
- Genre: Blues
- Length: 56:51
- Label: Telarc International Corporation
- Producer: Tinsley Ellis

Tinsley Ellis chronology
Kingpin (2000)	Hell or High Water (2002)	The Hard Way (2004)

Professional ratings
Review scores
Source	Rating
AllMusic	3/5 stars
The Penguin Guide to Blues Recordings	1/4 stars

Hell or High Water is a 2002 blues album by Tinsley Ellis. It was recorded and mixed at Stonehenge at ZAC Atlanta, Georgia by Eddy Offord and Jimmy Zumpano, mastered by Rodney Mills and produced by Eddy Offord with Robert Woods as executive producer and Michael Rothschild as co-ordinating producer. Tinsley wrote all the songs.

== Track listing ==
1. "Hell or High Water"
2. "Hooked"
3. "Mystery to Me"
4. "I'll Get Over You"
5. "Love Comes Knockin'"
6. "Stuck in Love"
7. "Real Bad Way"
8. "All Rumors Are True"
9. "All I Can Do"
10. "Love Me By Phone"
11. "Feelin' No Pain"
12. "Ten Year Day"
13. "Set Love Free"

== Musicians ==
- Tinsley Ellis — Lead vocals, lead guitar, acoustic guitar on "Love Comes Knockin'" and "Set Love Free"
- Phillip Skipper — Bass guitar
- Kenny Kilgore — Guitar
- Scott Callison — Drums
- Kevin McKendree — Keyboards
- Donna Hopkins — Background vocals on "Hell Or High Water," "Mystery to Me," and "Ten Year Day"
