= Kingpin (Tinsley Ellis album) =

Studio album by Tinsley Ellis
- Released: 2000
- Genre: Blues
- Label: Capricorn Records
- Producer: David Z

Tinsley Ellis chronology
Fire It Up (1997)	Kingpin (2000)	Hell or High Water (2002)

Kingpin is a 2000 blues album by Tinsley Ellis. It was recorded at Ocean Way by David Z (also the producer) who also mixed at Javelina Recording Studio (both in Nashville, Tennessee) for Supersonic Productions. It was mastered by George Marino at Sterling Sound New York. Tinsley wrote/co-wrote three of the songs.

== Track listing ==
1. "Heart Fixing Business" (Homer Banks/Allen Jones)
2. "Sweet Pea" (Wayne Burdette/Tinsley Ellis)
3. "Dyin' to Do Wrong" (Ellis)
4. "Can't Play That Way" (Ellis)
5. "I've Got to Use My Imagination" (Gerry Goffin/Barry Goldberg)
6. "I Got to Moan" (S. Boyer)
7. "I'll Be Loving You" (J.L. Williams)
8. "The Other Side of Town" (Sir Mack Rice/Jon Tiven/Sally Tiven)
9. "Days of Old" (B.B. King/Josea Taub)
10. "Slingshots and Boomerangs" (C.C. Adcock/David Egan)
11. "Let's Think About It" (Arthur Alexander/Jon Tiven)

== Musicians ==
- Tinsley Ellis on Guitar and vocals
- David Smith on Bass guitar
- Reese Wynans on keyboards
- Jack Holder on guitar
- Richie Hayward on drums
- Kevin McKendree on organ
- David Z on guitar, keyboards, percussion
- Little Joey Hoegger on harmonica
- Jim Hoke on saxophone
