= Tore Up =

Studio album by Nappy Brown
- Released: 1984
- Genre: Blues, R&B
- Label: Landslide
- Producer: Eddy Offord

Nappy Brown chronology
I Done Got Over (1983)	Tore Up (1984)	Something Gonna Jump Out the Bushes! (1987)

Tore Up is an album by the American musician Nappy Brown, released in 1984. A comeback album, it was recorded with Tinsley Ellis and the Heartfixers. The album was reissued by Alligator Records in 1990.

The album sold around 10,000 copies in its first three years of release.

== Production ==
Recorded in East Point, Georgia, the album was produced by Eddy Offord, with Ricky Keller and Michael Rothschild. Brown decided to make an album with the Heartfixers after sitting in with them during an Atlanta show.

"Hidden Charms" is a cover of the Willie Dixon song. "Lemon Squeezin' Daddy" was written by Brown in the 1950s; Brown had wanted to release it as a single, but Savoy Records considered it too bawdy.

== Critical reception ==
Professional ratings
Review scores
Source	Rating
AllMusic	4/5 stars
The Buffalo News	2.5/4 stars
The Encyclopedia of Popular Music	3/5 stars
MusicHound Blues: The Essential Album Guide	3/5 stars
Orlando Sentinel	5/5 stars
The Penguin Guide to Blues Recordings	2.5/4 stars
The Philadelphia Inquirer	3/4 stars
The Rolling Stone Album Guide	3/5 stars

The Philadelphia Inquirer wrote that "the Brown voice is big and raunchy on such tunes as 'Jack the Rabbit', 'Ain't My Cross to Bear' and 'Hard Luck Blues', and the Heartfixers provide solid accompaniment." The Orlando Sentinel thought that "Ellis' steamy licks, Oliver Wells' soulful organ, Scott Alexander's even more soulful piano and a four-piece horn section provide the perfect setting for Brown's deep, versatile voice."

The Atlanta Journal-Constitution concluded that, "while it may not catch Brown at the height of his vocal powers, the sound does reflect his maturity and happiness." The Buffalo News determined that Brown's "chops here are as formidable as on his classic '50s stuff."

AllMusic called the album "very credible," writing that Brown "reprises his salacious blues 'Lemon Squeezin' Daddy' and rolls his R's like the good old days." The Rolling Stone Album Guide stated that "Brown is an engaging performer and ebullient presence." The Penguin Guide to Blues Recordings criticized the "generic versions of the Chicago guitar-band sound with added horns."

== Track listing ==
No.	Title	Length
1.	"Who"
2.	"You Can Make It If You Try"
3.	"Heartbreak"
4.	"Lemon Squeezin' Daddy"
5.	"Jack the Rabbit"
6.	"Hidden Charms"
7.	"Losing Hand"
8.	"Tonight I'll Be Staying Here with You"
9.	"Hard Luck Blues"
10.	"Tore Up Over You"
11.	"Ain't My Cross to Bear"
