= Trouble Time =

Studio album by Tinsley Ellis
- Released: 1992
- Genre: Blues
- Label: Alligator Records
- Producer: Ricky Keller, Tinsley Ellis, Bruce Iglauer

Tinsley Ellis chronology
Fanning the Flames (1989)	Trouble Time (1992)	Storm Warning (1994)

Professional ratings
Review scores
Source	Rating
The Penguin Guide to Blues Recordings	2.5/4 stars

Trouble Time is a 1992 blues album by Tinsley Ellis. It was recorded by Mark Richardson at Triclops Sound Studios and Ricky Keller at Southern Living Studio in Atlanta, Georgia with horns recorded by Lynn Fuston at Classic Recording Nashville, Tennessee. It was mixed by Rodney Mills assisted by Russ Fowler and Tag George at Southern Tracks Studios Atlanta, Georgia, mastered by Dr. Toby Mountain at Northeastern Digital, Southborough, Massachusetts, and produced by Ricky Keller, Tinsley Ellis and Bruce Iglauer, with Michael Rothschild as executive producer. Tinsley wrote/co-wrote all songs except "Hey Hey Baby", "What Have I Done Wrong?" and "The Axe".

== Track listing ==
1. "Highwayman"
2. "Hey Hey Baby"
3. "Sign of the Blues"
4. "What Have I Done Wrong?"
5. "The Big Chicken"
6. "The Axe"
7. "Come Morning"
8. "My Restless Heart"
9. "Bad Dream # 108"
10. "The Hulk"
11. "Now I'm Gone"
12. "Red Dress"

== Musicians ==
- Tinsley Ellis on guitar and vocals
- Ricky Keller and James Ferguson on bass guitar
- Chuck Leavell on piano
- Peter Buck on guitar
- Scott Meeder and David Sims on drums
- Oliver Wells on organ and keyboards
- Mike Boyette on piano and organ

Horns on "Now I'm Gone":

- Sam Levine on tenor saxophone
- Chris McDonald on trombone
- Mike Haynes and Michael Holton on trumpet
