= RockCrown =

Studio album by Seven Mary Three
- Released: June 3, 1997
- Recorded: October 1996 at Crowsway USA in New Orleans, LA
- Genre: Rock, post-grunge
- Length: 53:03
- Label: Atlantic
- Producer: Tom Morris, Jason Pollock, Jason Ross

Seven Mary Three chronology
American Standard (1995)	RockCrown (1997)	B-Sides & Rarities (1997)

Singles from RockCrown
- 1. "RockCrown" Released: 1997; 2. "Make Up Your Mind" Released: 1997; 3. "Lucky" Released: 1997

RockCrown is the third studio album by post-grunge band Seven Mary Three. It was released on June 3, 1997 on Atlantic Records. The album peaked at number 75 on the Billboard 200 on June 21, 1997. The album's Billboard-charting singles were "Lucky" (number 19 on Modern Rock Tracks and number 35 on Mainstream Rock Tracks) and the title track (number 17 on Mainstream Rock Tracks).

== Critical reception ==
Professional ratings
Review scores
Source	Rating
AllMusic	2/5 stars
Rolling Stone	2/5 stars

AllMusic's Stephen Thomas Erlewine criticized the band's musicianship for still being "a horrid cross between Pearl Jam and Grand Funk Railroad," and felt their ambition to emulate the sociopolitical issues found in Bruce Springsteen's best material was undone by their lackluster guitar work, concluding that "There are a couple of glimpses that the band could develop their own voice on Rock Crown, but the album in general finds Seven Mary Three floundering." Rob O'Connor from Rolling Stone said the band are at their best on the album's more subdued cuts like "Make Up Your Mind" and "I Could Be Wrong" than the "overblown seriousness" found on "People Like New" and "Times Like These", saying "there might be a place for them somewhere other than a Vegas Grunge Revival in the year 2020."

== Track listing ==
All tracks are written by Seven Mary Three.

No.	Title	Length
1.	"Lucky"	3:57
2.	"RockCrown"	2:45
3.	"Needle Can't Burn (What The Needle Can't Find)"	2:22
4.	"Honey of Generation"	3:55
5.	"Home Stretch"	3:01
6.	"People Like New"	3:59
7.	"Make Up Your Mind"	2:31
8.	"Gone Away"	2:11
9.	"Times Like These"	4:33
10.	"I Could Be Wrong"	3:46
11.	"What Angry Blue?"	3:31
12.	"Houdini's Angels"	3:28
13.	"This Evening's Great Excuse"	4:12
14.	"Player Piano"	2:19
15.	"Oven"	6:04

- Two additional songs ("The New Blues" and "A Little Hard, A Little Late") are listed in a picture of an album setlist, but are not included on the album.

== Album credits ==
- Jason Ross – lead vocals, rhythm guitar
- Jason Pollock – lead guitar, backing vocals
- Casey Daniel – bass
- Giti Khalsa – drums

=== Production ===
- Producers: Tom Morris, Jason Pollock, and Jason Ross
- Engineering: Tom Morris and Brian Benscoter
- Mixing: Tom Morris
- Mastering: Mike Fuller and Tom Morris
- Art Direction: Lane Wurster and Seven Mary Three
- Graphic Design: Chris Eselgroth
- Photography: Danny Clinch
