= Don't Be Angry =

1955 single by Nappy Brown

Single by Nappy Brown
- Released: 1955
- Recorded: 1955
- Genre: R&B, soul, blues
- Length: 2:24
- Label: Savoy
- Songwriters: Nappy Brown, Rose Marie McCoy, Fred Mendelsohn

"Don't Be Angry"

Single by The Crew-Cuts
- Released: 1955
- Recorded: 1955
- Genre: Vocal pop, doo wop, R&B, traditional pop, jump blues, big band
- Length: 2:11
- Label: Mercury
- Songwriters: Nappy Brown, Rose Marie McCoy, Fred Mendelsohn

The Crew-Cuts singles chronology
"Sh-Boom" (1954)	"Don't Be Angry" (1955)	"Earth Angel" (1955)

"Don't Be Angry" is a popular song written by Nappy Brown, Rose Marie McCoy, and Fred Mendelsohn and published in 1955. Brown released it in 1955, reaching No. 2 on the Billboard R&B chart. It also went to No. 25 on the US Best Seller list.

The song opens with the gimmick vocal "So, l-l-l-l-l-l", a vibrato trick that Brown had picked up from listening to foreign radio stations. This trick became his trademark and was used in several subsequent recordings.

== Cover versions ==
- A recording by The Crew Cuts was released by Mercury Records. It first reached the Billboard charts on April 30, 1955. On the disk Jockey chart, it peaked at No. 14. On the Best Seller chart, it peaked at No. 14 and lasted 8 weeks. On the Juke Box chart, it peaked at No. 19. The flip side was "Chop Chop Boom."
- A recording by American doo wop group, The Cadets, was also released in April 1955.
- The song was covered by Bad Manners on their 1981 album Gosh It's... Bad Manners.
- Nick Curran released a cover version of the song on his album "Doctor Velvet" on February 4, 2003.
