= Toussaint McCall =

American singer (1939–2023)

Toussaint Louverture McCall

Background information
- Born: March 26, 1939; Delhi, Louisiana, U.S.
- Died: August 7, 2023 (aged 84) Los Angeles, California, U.S.
- Genres: Rhythm and blues
- Occupation: Singer
- Instrument: Organ
- Years active: 1966–2023

Toussaint McCall (March 26, 1939 – August 7, 2023) was an American R&B singer and organist.

== Biography ==
Toussaint McCall was born in Delhi, Louisiana, but was a long-time resident of nearby Monroe, Louisiana. His father, Rev. D. L. McCall, was a pastor at the Seven Star Missionary Baptist Church in Delhi, and Toussaint was one of twelve children. He was named after the Haitian revolutionary Toussaint Louverture.

After graduating high school, McCall attended Southern University in Baton Rouge, Louisiana. After many years of working in the music industry, he received a recording contract with Shreveport, Louisiana-based Ronn Records.

His one major success was with "Nothing Takes the Place of You", which reached #5 in the US R&B chart, issued on Ronn Records in 1967. Although further singles and an album followed, he did not repeat its success.

McCall continued performing and recording for local record labels, and in 1988 made a cameo appearance in the John Waters film Hairspray, lip syncing to his hit song. The film took place in 1962 Baltimore, but his hit was originally recorded and released in 1967, making his appearance in the movie anachronistic.

In May 2005, McCall was interviewed on the American Routes radio show, where he talked about the writing of "Nothing Takes the Place of You."

McCall was inducted into the Northeast Louisiana Music Hall of Fame in 2016. He died on August 7, 2023, at the age of 84.

== Charting singles ==
- "I'll Do It for You" (1967) US #77, US R&B #26
- "Nothing Takes the Place of You" (1967) US #52, US R&B #5, CAN #46

== Cover versions ==
Asleep at the Wheel covered the song (as "Nothin' Takes the Place of You") in 1976. Their version reached #35 on the U.S. Country chart and #30 Canada Country during the spring of the year.

Al Green covered the song on his 1976 album Have A Good Time

Shovels & Rope covered “Nothing Takes the Place of You” on their 2015 album Busted Jukebox, Vol. 1 alongside JD McPherson.

Prince Buster, the Jamaican artist, recorded a ska version of “Nothing Takes the Place of You”
