= The Economy of Sound =

Studio album by Seven Mary Three
- Released: June 5, 2001
- Studio: Morrisound Recording (Tampa, FL); Transcontinental Studios (Orlando, FL)
- Genre: Rock, post-grunge
- Length: 40:08
- Label: Mammoth
- Producer: Jason Ross, Tom Morris, Neal Avron

Seven Mary Three chronology
Orange Ave. (1998)	The Economy of Sound (2001)	Welcome Race Fans (2003)

Professional ratings
Review scores
Source	Rating
AllMusic	3/5 stars
The Encyclopedia of Popular Music	3/5 stars

The Economy of Sound is the fifth studio album by American post-grunge band Seven Mary Three. It was released on June 5, 2001, on Mammoth Records. The album peaked at No. 178 on the Billboard 200 on June 23, 2001.

The album's Billboard-charting singles were "Wait" (No. 7 on Hot Mainstream Rock Tracks and No. 21 on Hot Modern Rock Tracks) and "Sleepwalking" (No. 39 on Hot Mainstream Rock Tracks).

== Critical reception ==
The Encyclopedia of Popular Music wrote that the album "jettisoned the vestiges of the band's grunge sound in favour of crowd pleasing hard rock."

== Track listing ==
All songs written by Jason Ross, except where noted.

No.	Title	Length
1.	"Sleepwalking" (Ross, Juliano)	2:48
2.	"Wait"	3:08
3.	"Faster"	3:22
4.	"Summer is Over" (Ross, Daniel, Juliano)	2:56
5.	"Honey"	3:15
6.	"Still I Find You"	4:00
7.	"Breakdown" (Ross, Daniel)	2:34
8.	"Man in Control?"	4:11
9.	"Zeroes & Ones" (Ross, McKendree)	4:34
10.	"First Time Believers"	3:01
11.	"Steal a Car"	2:26
12.	"Tug"	4:06

== Album credits ==
- Jason Ross – lead vocals, rhythm guitar
- Thomas Juliano – lead guitar, backing vocals
- Casey Daniel – bass
- Giti Khalsa – drums
- Kevin McKendree – keyboards
- Eric Gardner – percussion

=== Production ===
- Producers: Jason Ross, Tom Morris, and Neal Avron
- Engineering: Tom Morris with Matt Martone
- Mixing: Neal Avron, except Tracks 1 and 2 mixed by Chris Lord-Alge
- Mastering: Bob Ludwig
- Art Direction: Lane Wurster
- Graphic Design: Chris Eselgroth
- Photography: Christian Lantry
