= Tinsley Ellis =

American blues and rock musician (born 1957)

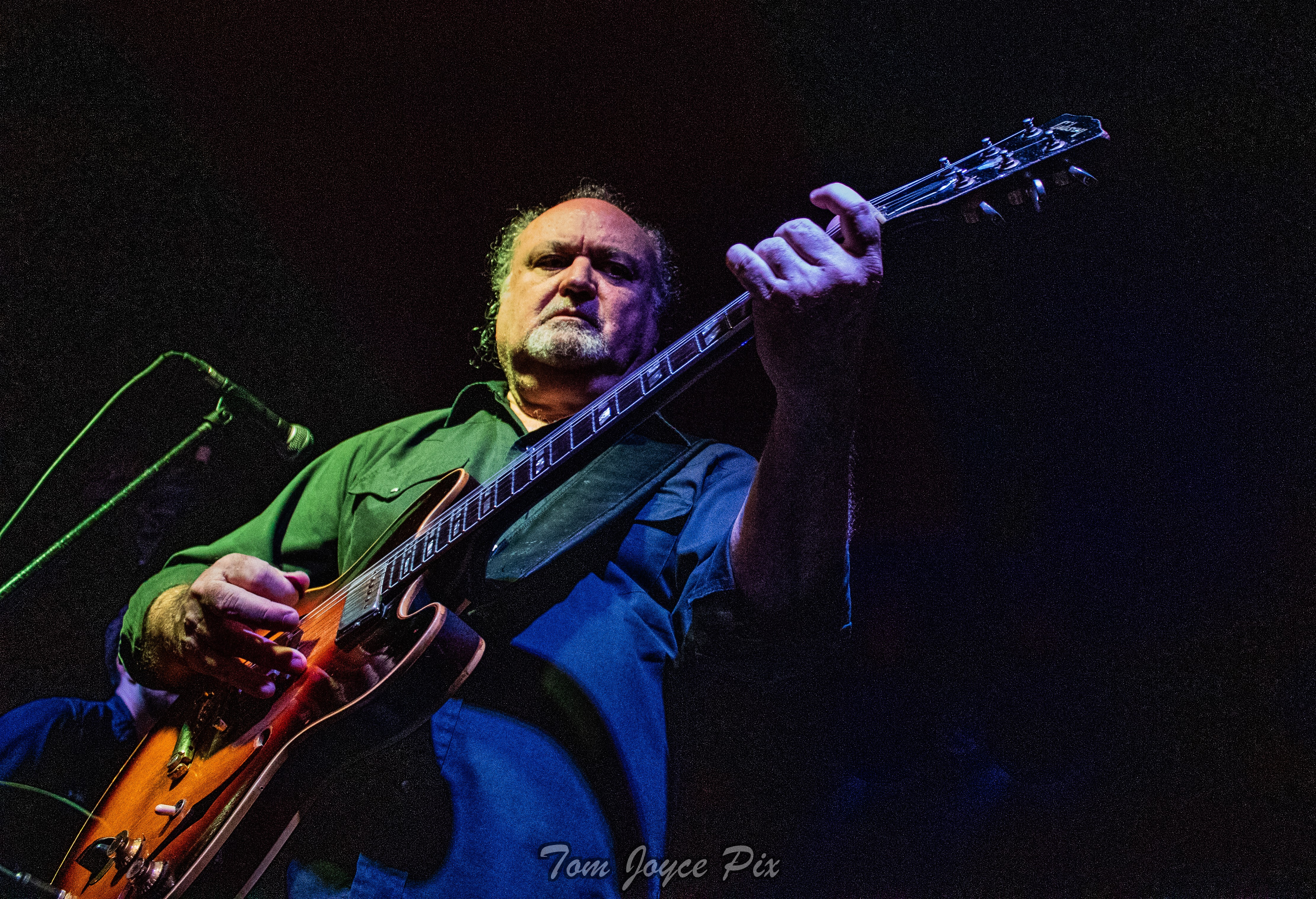

Background information
- Born: Tinsley Ellis; June 4, 1957 (age 69); Atlanta, Georgia, United States
- Genres: Blues rock; hard rock; southern rock
- Occupations: Musician, songwriter
- Instruments: Guitar; vocals
- Years active: 1975–present
- Labels: Alligator; Capricorn; Telarc; Heartfixer Music
- Website: TinsleyEllis.com

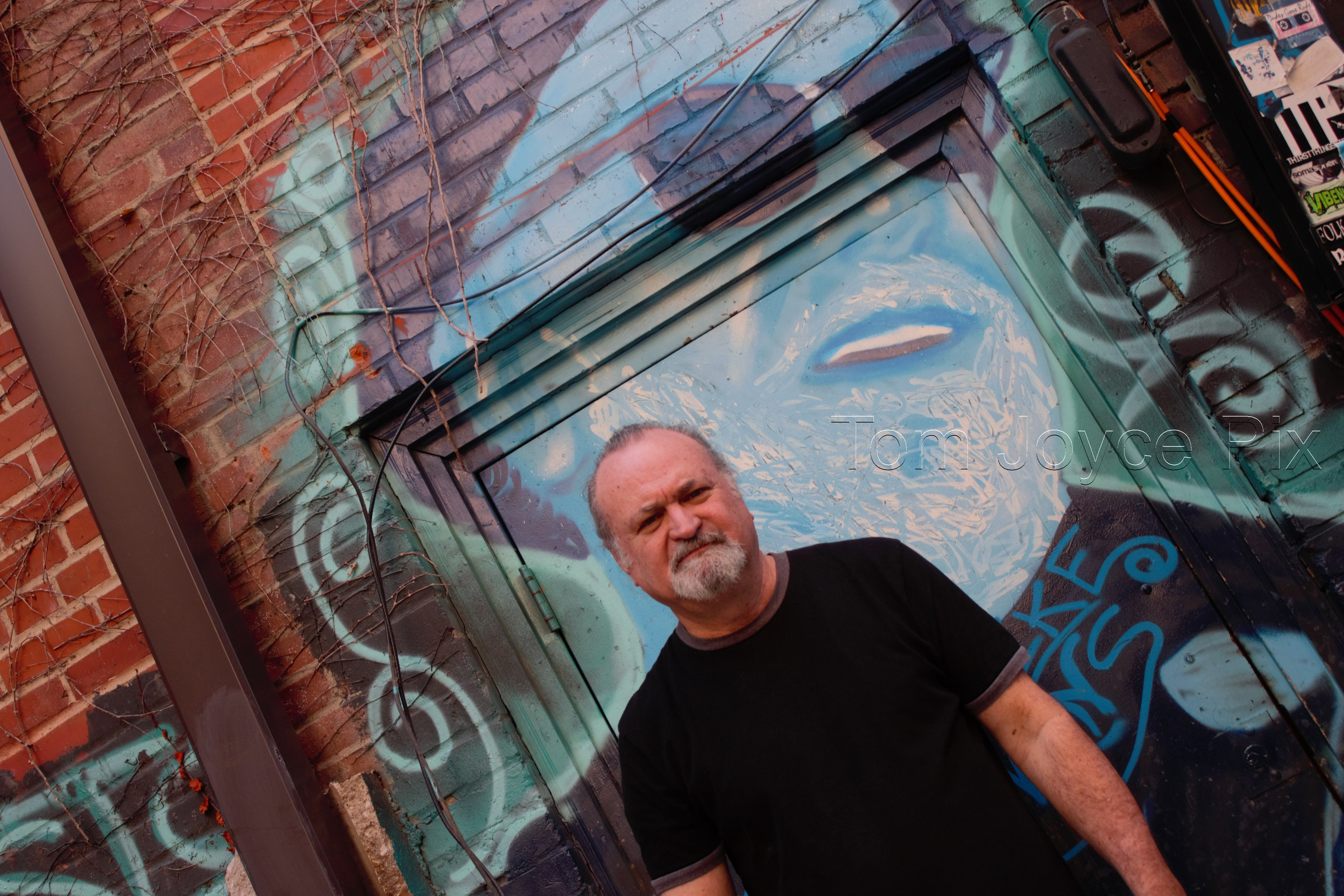

Tinsley Ellis (born June 4, 1957) is an American blues and rock musician, who was born in Atlanta, Georgia, United States, and grew up in South Florida. According to Billboard, "nobody has released more consistently excellent blues albums than Atlanta's Tinsley Ellis. He sings like a man possessed and wields a mean lead guitar."

Rolling Stone said, "On assertive originals and standards by the likes of Jimmy Reed and Junior Wells, Atlanta's Tinsley Ellis unleashes feral blues guitar. Nonstop gigging has sharpened his six-string to a razor's edge…his eloquence dazzles…he also achieves pyrotechnics that rival early Jeff Beck and Eric Clapton."

== Biography ==
His love for electric blues grew by listening to British Invasion bands such as the Yardbirds, the Animals, Cream, and the Rolling Stones. Ellis has stated that the first guitar playing he heard were songs like "Dirty Water" by The Standells, and "Secret Agent Man" by Johnny Rivers, but that he then "got into the real stuff" like Freddie King. Inspired by a live appearance by B.B. King, where King broke a guitar string and gave it to a 15-year-old Ellis—which he claims to still have in his possession to this day—he was determined to become a blues guitarist. In 1975, he played with the Haygood Band while attending Emory University near Atlanta. Two years later, already an accomplished musician, he returned to Atlanta and joined his first professional blues band, the Alley Cats, a group that included Preston Hubbard (later of the Fabulous Thunderbirds). Ellis graduated from Emory in 1979 with a degree in history. In 1981, he formed the Heartfixers, with the singer and harmonica player Chicago Bob Nelson. The group recorded three albums for the small Landslide record label, one with the singer, Nappy Brown before breaking up in 1988. The same year, Ellis signed a recording contract with Chicago's Alligator Records.

His debut solo album on Alligator Records, Georgia Blue, was released in 1988. It received mixed-to-poor reviews. Alligator then reissued two earlier albums, Cool On It and Tore Up (on which the Heartfixers backed Nappy Brown). Ellis' next four releases were Fanning the Flames (1989), Trouble Time (1992), Storm Warning (1994), and Fire It Up (1997). Artists including Peter Buck (of R.E.M.), Derek Trucks, and Chuck Leavell joined him in the studio. He worked with the record producers, Eddy Offord and Tom Dowd.

Ellis' reputation and media coverage continued to grow. He appeared on NBC-TV Sports during the network's 1996 Summer Olympics coverage.

Ellis shifted to Capricorn Records in 2000 and released Kingpin. In 2002 he joined Telarc Records, producing two CDs: Hell or High Water and The Hard Way. All the while Ellis never stopped touring. "A musician never got famous by staying home," Ellis says. Ellis claims to have performed live, at least once, in all 50 of the United States.

He returned to Alligator Records in 2005 with the live album, Live – Highwayman. In 2007 he released the studio album, Moment of Truth, followed in 2009 with Speak No Evil. Ellis continues to tour over 150 nights a year around the world.

He has shared stages with Warren Haynes, Widespread Panic, the Allman Brothers Band, Stevie Ray Vaughan, Jimmy Thackery, Otis Rush, Willie Dixon, Son Seals, Koko Taylor, Albert Collins and Buddy Guy.

In early 2013, Ellis was a part of the 'Blues at the Crossroads 2' tour which celebrated the music of Muddy Waters and Howlin' Wolf. The tour also included Kim Wilson and the Fabulous Thunderbirds, James Cotton, Bob Margolin and Jody Williams. Also in 2013, Ellis launched his own label, Heartfixer Music, and has since released several albums: the all instrumental Get It!, Midnight Blue, Tough Love and, in 2016, Red Clay Soul. In 2014, Ellis was a guest performer on Eli Cook's album, Primitive Son. In 2017, Ellis launched a new side project called Tinsley Ellis Blues Is Dead, in which he performs the blues and R&B songs recorded by Grateful Dead and other Fillmore era acts.

Commenting on Ellis's album, Ice Cream in Hell, AllMusic stated "On Ice Cream in Hell, Ellis' songwriting and singing finally match the prowess in his playing, and we are all richer for it." During the COVID-19 pandemic, Ellis was "determined to grow as a songwriter," according to AllMusic; he is stated to have written 200 songs in just a year and a half. The resulting album, Devil May Care, released in January 2022, was met with overwhelmingly positive reviews.

Ellis announced the pending release of a new album, Naked Truth, in November 2023, after a series of well-received acoustic shows throughout the year. The album, which was also his first composed entirely of acoustic music, was released on February 9, 2024. Ellis released a single, "Devil In The Room", after making the announcement.

== Discography ==
- 1982: Featuring Chicago Bob Nelson (Southland SLP-12 - with The Heartfixers)
- 1983: Live At The Moonshadow (Landslide LD-1007 - with The Heartfixers)
- 1984: Tore Up (Landslide LD-1008 - with Nappy Brown and The Heartfixers)
- 1986: Cool on It (Landslide LNLP1010 - with The Heartfixers)
- 1988: Georgia Blue (Alligator ALCD4765)
- 1989: Fanning The Flames (Alligator ALCD4778)
- 1992: Trouble Time (Alligator ALCD4805)
- 1994: Storm Warning (Alligator ALCD4823)
- 1997: Fire It Up (Alligator ALCD4852)
- 2000: Kingpin (Capricorn 314 546 215-2)
- 2002: Hell Or High Water (Telarc Blues CD-53531)
- 2004: The Hard Way (Telarc Blues CD-63608)
- 2005: Live – Highwayman (Alligator ALCD4904)
- 2007: Moment Of Truth (Alligator ALCD4916)
- 2009: Speak No Evil (Alligator ALCD4932)
- 2013: Get It! (Heartfixer Music HFM1010)
- 2014: Midnight Blue (Heartfixer Music HFM1011)
- 2015: Tough Love (Heartfixer Music HFM1012)
- 2016: Red Clay Soul (Heartfixer Music HFM1013)
- 2018: Winning Hand (Alligator ALCD4979)
- 2020: Ice Cream In Hell (Alligator ALCD4997)
- 2022: Devil May Care (Alligator ALCD5008)
- 2024: Naked Truth (Alligator ALCD5017)
- 2026: Labor Of Love (Alligator ALCD5031)

=== Compilations ===
- 1996 – A Celebration of Blues: The New Breed (St. Clair CBL25152)
