= Sean Costello =

American musician (1979–2008)

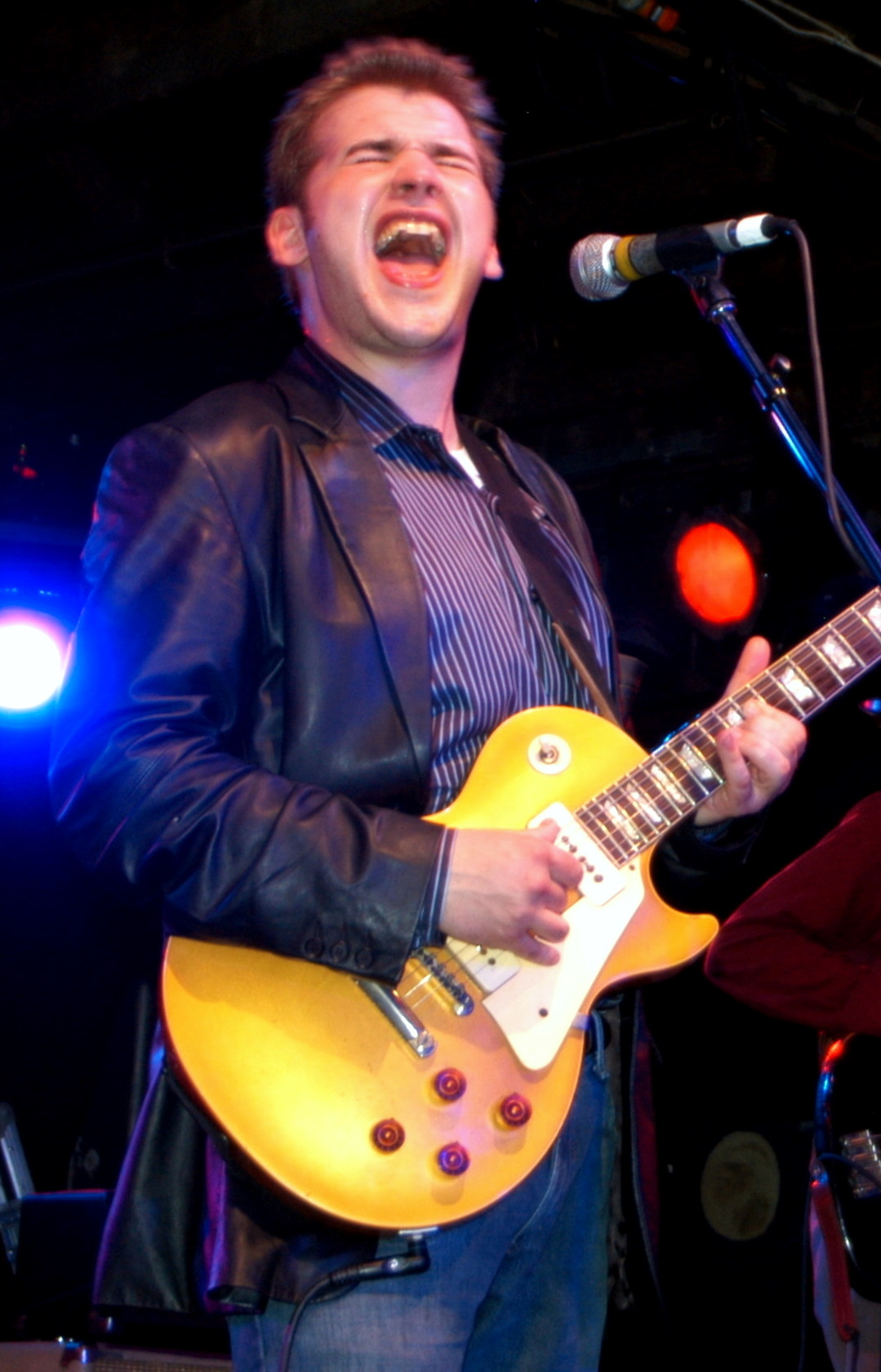
- Costello performing in 2005

Background information
- Born: April 16, 1979; Philadelphia, United States
- Died: April 15, 2008 (aged 28) Atlanta, United States
- Genres: Blues, soul
- Instruments: Guitar, vocals
- Years active: 1995–2008

Sean Costello (April 16, 1979 – April 15, 2008) was an American blues musician, renowned for his fiery guitar playing and soulful singing. He released five critically acclaimed albums before his career was cut short by his sudden death from a drug overdose at the age of 28. Tinsley Ellis called him ‘the most gifted young blues guitarist on the scene... he was a triple threat on guitar, vocals and as a songwriter’.

== Career ==
Costello mastered traditional blues guitar at an early age and began his career while still in high school. His records became increasingly eclectic as his career progressed.

=== Early years ===
Born in Philadelphia, Costello moved to Atlanta at the age of nine. Obsessive about the guitar from a young age, he got hooked on the blues after buying Howlin’ Wolf's 'Rockin' Chair Album'. At 14 the young prodigy created a stir in a Memphis guitar shop, where an employee tipped his father off about a talent contest sponsored by the Beale Street Blues Society, which Costello duly entered and won. He formed his first band shortly after.

At sixteen, Costello recorded his first album, Call The Cops (1996), already ‘displaying a flawless command of 1950s blues guitar’, in the words of music historian Tony Russell. His lead guitar work on Susan Tedeschi's gold-selling album, Just Won't Burn, (1998), subsequently brought him national exposure. Costello's band later toured as Tedeschi's backing group.

"His playing is shockingly deep for a 20-year old", wrote the AllMusic guide of Costello's second album, Cuttin’ In (2000), which was nominated for a W. C. Handy Award for Best New Artist Debut. The follow-up, Moanin’ For Molasses, was equally well received; the AllMusic guide drew attention to Costello's "soulful voice" and his "ability to mesh blues, R&B and soul". "Passionate... distinctive and often compelling... Costello's vocals are most astonishing," reported Blues Revue Magazine.

=== In concert ===
Costello played over 300 performances per year and toured widely in the United States and Europe. His reputation as a live performer enabled him to play alongside B. B. King and Buddy Guy (Ma Rainey House benefit concert, Columbus, Georgia, June 1997), James Cotton (Cotton's 64th birthday concert in Memphis) and Hubert Sumlin (South by Southwest, Austin, Texas, March 2005). When not touring, Costello made a living playing small venues in his home town of Atlanta, Georgia, such as the Northside Tavern. Richard Rosenblatt, former President of Tone-Cool Records, recalls Costello's performances:

As a guitarist he was astounding, but for Sean it was never about showing off monstrous chops or stroking his own ego. His playing always fit the song; he would work the tone and phrasing, sometimes with an economy of notes that let the empty spaces hang achingly for what seemed like hours. When he did take off on the occasional blazing run, he was the ultimate tightrope walker, flirting fearlessly with danger before bringing it all back home with the unlikeliest of phrases that was still, somehow, perfect.

=== Later career ===
Through Amy Helm of Ollabelle, Costello met her father, Americana musician Levon Helm, formerly of The Band, whose eclecticism encouraged Costello to further develop his interests outside the blues: "he really blew it wide open for me. He’d play a Chuck Berry tune, then a blues, then a country tune or a rock number or whatever, and he didn’t even think twice about it." Levon Helm and the members of Ollabelle were among the contributors to Costello’s fourth, self-titled album, recorded in New York City with input from local musicians. With an eclectic set list, and arrangements reminiscent more of Memphis soul than Chicago blues, Sean Costello (2005) marked a departure from his earlier work. Costello’s guitar took a backseat to his voice, which by now "had acquired a ragged edge of considerable power" (Tony Russell).

In 2007, Costello's playing on Nappy Brown's comeback album, Long Time Coming, was singled out for praise by the critics. The following year Costello released what was to be his last album, We Can Get Together, acclaimed by many as his best work. His guitar playing on this record was described variously as "incendiary", "searing", and "blistering red hot". It earned Costello two Blues Music Award nominations for Best Contemporary Album and Best Contemporary Male Artist. Hal Horowitz of the AllMusic guide summed up We Can Get Together with the following:

The material is so strong and the ensemble playing of his band so effortless that he doesn't need to distract attention from the songs with the extended soloing he is capable of. Most importantly, he establishes a greasy groove that weaves through each cut, connecting them even when the styles differ. While Costello is clearly inspired by the blues greats, many of whom he has covered on previous collections, he slants more to '70s Southern soul, rock, and R&B here, dousing these genres with a bucket load of swamp water and spearheaded by his whiskey-laced vocals. There's a thick, gooey atmospheric vibe that hangs over the album, gels its contents, and shows Costello to be a terrific singer and songwriter and guitar talent just hitting his peak.

On October 11, 2014, Sean was inducted into the Georgia Music Hall of Fame.

=== Death ===
Sean Costello was found dead in his Atlanta hotel room on April 15, 2008, one day before his 29th birthday. He was in treatment for dual diagnosis at the time of his death, and a lawsuit was filed with the facility. He had not slept in three days, having been discharged in a manic episode. The day he died, he told friends he was not feeling well and could not sleep. On June 3, the Fulton County Medical Examiner released Costello's toxicology report, ruling his cause of death to be combined drug intoxication of heroin, chlordiazepoxide, ephedrine, and amphetamine, with the manner of death an accident. Costello's family revealed he suffered from bipolar disorder and set up the Sean Costello Memorial Fund for Bipolar Research in his honor.

== Discography ==
=== Solo releases ===
- Call the Cops (1996)
- Cuttin' In (2000)
- Moanin' for Molasses (2001)
- Sean Costello (2005)
- We Can Get Together (2008)
- Sean's Blues: A Memorial Retrospective (2009)
- At His Best – Live (2011)
- In the Magic Shop (2014)

=== Guest appearances ===
- Pat Ramsey, It's About Time (1995)
- Bobby Little, Featuring the Counts of Rhythm (1996)
- Susan Tedeschi, Just Won't Burn (1998)
- Mikael Santana, In Transit (1998)
- Mudcat, Mo' Better Chicken (2000)
- Jody Williams, Return of a Legend (2002)
- Various artists, Blues on Blonde on Blonde (2003)
- Ollabelle, Ollabelle (2004)
- Tinsley Ellis, The Hard Way (2004)
- Kieran McGee, Anonymous (2004)
- Clarence Fountain and the Five Blind Boys of Alabama, I'm Not That Way Anymore (2004)
- The Levon Helm Band, Midnight Ramble Sessions Vol. 2 (2005)
- The Cazanovas, "Borrowed Time" (2006)
- Bill Sheffield, Journal on a Shelf (2006)
- Nappy Brown, Long Time Coming (2007)
- Joe McGuinness, From These Seeds (2008)
- Lex Samu & The Kraft Quartet, Nervous Boogie (2008)
- Maddy Moneypenny, Maddy Moneypenny (2008)
- Jenni Muldaur, Dearest Darlin' (2009)
