= Nappy Brown =

American R&B singer-songwriter (1929–2008)

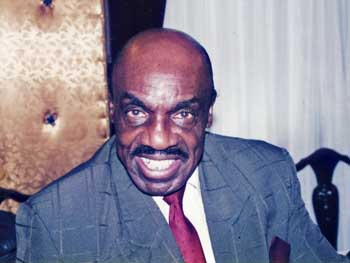
- Nappy Brown in Tokyo, Japan, 1996.

Background information
- Also known as: Nappy Brown
- Born: Napoleon Brown Goodson Culp; October 12, 1929; Charlotte, North Carolina, U.S.
- Died: September 20, 2008 (aged 78) Charlotte, North Carolina, U.S.
- Genres: R&B; Soul; Blues
- Occupations: Vocalist, musician, songwriter
- Instrument: Vocals
- Years active: 1954–2008
- Formerly of: The Heavenly Lights, Nappy Brown and the Heartfixers

Napoleon Brown Goodson Culp (October 12, 1929 – September 20, 2008) better known by his stage name Nappy Brown, was an American R&B singer. His hits include the 1955 Billboard chart No. 2 "Don't Be Angry", "Little By Little", and "Night Time Is the Right Time". His style was recognizable; Brown used a wide vibrato, melisma, and distinctive extra syllables, in particular, "li-li-li-li-li."

== Biography ==
Brown was the son of Kathryn Culp and Sammie Lee Brown. After his mother died he was brought up by Fred and Maggie Culp. They attended Gethsemane AME Zion Church and he attended school in Charlotte, North Carolina.

=== Early career ===
He began his career singing gospel music before switching to R&B. In 1954 he won a recording contract with Savoy Records, which yielded a series of hits, including "Don't Be Angry" (No. 2 R&B, No. 25 pop, 1955), "Pitter Patter" (No. 10 R&B, 1955), "Little By Little" (No. 57 pop, 1956), and "It Don't Hurt No More" (No. 8 R&B, No. 89 pop, 1958). Brown was among the biggest stars in R&B, frequently touring with the revues of Alan Freed.

His songs, along with those of his peers and contemporaries (such as Little Richard, Chuck Berry, and Fats Domino), were among the first wave of African-American pop music to become noticed and popular with white audiences. Elvis Presley reportedly used to see Brown perform whenever he appeared in Memphis. In addition to Brown's influence on blues music, and 1950s R&B and pop, Brown's powerful and protean voice, combined with his distinctive emotive style, is widely viewed as a key link in the development of soul music.

=== 1980s comeback ===
In the early 1980s, a renewed interest in R&B led to some of Brown's early songs being released on European albums. At the urging of Bob Margolin, former guitarist for Muddy Waters's band and a fan of Brown, Brown returned to the music industry, beginning with a successful tour of Scandinavia in 1983. In 1984, 14 years since his last recording, Brown signed with Landslide Records and released the album Tore Up with The Heartfixers. Other recordings followed.

Brown's Savoy Records hit, "Piddly Patter" was featured in the John Waters film, Cry-Baby, starring Johnny Depp.

=== Later life ===
Nappy Brown's final album, Long Time Coming, recorded in May 2007, on Blind Pig Records, was released on September 25, 2007. Reviews were positive; the album and Brown were each nominated for a Blues Music Award. The album, produced by Scott Cable, featured the guitarists Sean Costello, Bob Margolin, Junior Watson, Joe Sunseri and other special guests performing Brown's hits and several new songs. In the fall of 2007, Nappy Brown was Living Blues magazine's September cover artist, and followed that honor with a European tour. Brown was a musical guest on Garrison Keillor's Prairie Home Companion on October 20, 2007.

At the ceremony for the Blues Music Awards in May 2008, Brown gave one last performance, capping a significant comeback year.

On June 1, 2008, following a performance at the Crawfish Festival in Augusta, New Jersey, Brown fell ill due to series of ailments and was hospitalized. He died in his sleep on September 20, 2008, at Mercy Hospital in Charlotte, North Carolina.

Brown was inducted into the Blues Hall of Fame on August 24, 2002.

Nappy Brown's 1956 recording of "Open Up That Door", is featured in a national commercial for Google, as of June 2020.

== Recordings ==
Roots To Scandinavian Blues (LP 1983/remastered 2009) with Knut Reiersrud guitar. Hot Club Records/Jon Larsen. Nappy Brown and The Electric City band. "Who's Been Fooling You" [1997/ new moon music]

== Discography ==
=== Albums ===
- Thanks For Nothing 1969
- Yes, I Know the Man 1974
- When I Get Inside 1977
- Tore Up 1984
- Don't Be Angry! 1984
- Something Gonna Jump Out the Bushes! 1987
- Deep Sea Diver 1989
- Apples & Lemons 1990
- Aw! Shucks 1991
- I'm a Wild Man 1994
- Just For Me 1996
- Who's Been Foolin' You 1997
- Best of Both Worlds 1998
- Long Time Coming 2007

=== Singles ===
Year	Single	Chart Positions		Label
Year	Single	US R&B	US	Label
1954	"I Wonder (What's Wrong With Me)"	—	—	Savoy
1955	"Don't Be Angry"	2	25	Savoy
1955	"Pitter Patter"	10	—	Savoy
1955	"Just a Little Love"	—	—	Savoy
1955	"Doodle I Love You"	—	—	Savoy
1956	"Open Up That Door (And Walk Right In My Heart)"	—	—	Savoy
1956	"Love, Baby"	—	—	Savoy
1956	"Little By Little"	—	57	Savoy
1957	"Pretty Girl"	—	—	Savoy
1957	"Bye Bye Baby"	—	—	Savoy
1957	"The Right Time"	—	—	Savoy
1958	"If You Need Some Lovin'"	—	—	Savoy
1958	"It Don't Hurt No More"	8	89	Savoy
1958	"You're Going to Need Someone"	—	—	Savoy
1959	"This Is My Confession"	—	—	Savoy
1959	"I Cried Like a Baby"	22	—	Savoy
1959	"Too Shy"	—	—	Savoy
1960	"My Baby Knows"	—	—	Savoy
1960	"Baby-Cry-Cry-Cry-Baby"	—	—	Savoy
1960	"Apple Of My Eye"	—	—	Savoy
1960	"Nobody Can Say"	—	—	Savoy
1961	"Coal Miner"	—	—	Savoy
1962	"I've Had My Fun"	—	—	Savoy
