= Day & Nightdriving =

Studio album by Seven Mary Three
- Released: February 19, 2008
- Recorded: at The Fidelitorium in Kernersville, NC and The Poplar House & Track and Field in Carrboro, NC
- Genre: Rock, post-grunge
- Length: 44:35
- Label: Bellum Records
- Producer: Jason Ross; Thomas Juliano; Brian Paulson

Seven Mary Three chronology
Dis/Location (2004)	Day & Nightdriving (2008)	Backbooth (2010)

Professional ratings
Review scores
Source	Rating
AllMusic	3.5/5 stars
Goldmine	3/5 stars

Day & Nightdriving is the seventh studio album by American post-grunge band Seven Mary Three. It was released in 2008 on Bellum Records. The album's lead single was "Last Kiss".

== Production ==
The album arose from acoustic jam sessions between guitarists Jason Ross and Thomas Juliano, leading to Day & Nightdriving's country-rock sound.

== Critical reception ==
The Courier-Journal wrote that "the album turns slightly with the Wilco-esque 'Dreaming Against Me', which invites the listener to sing out loud, while 'Hammer & a Stone', with its acoustic guitar set against piano, is simply beautiful." Goldmine called the album "one of the most pleasant surprises of 2008," writing that the band "has tapped into a rootsy side previously only hinted at."

== Track listing ==
All songs written by Jason Ross, except where noted.

1. "Last Kiss" – 3:58
2. "Laughing Out Loud" (Ross/Juliano) – 3:19
3. "Was a Ghost" (Ross/Juliano) – 3:46
4. "Dreaming Against Me" – 3:04
5. "Hammer & a Stone" – 4:13
6. "Break the Spell" – 3:59
7. "You Think Too Much" (Ross/Juliano) – 3:45
8. "Strangely at Home Here" – 3:46
9. "She Wants Results" – 3:57
10. "Upside Down" (Ross/Juliano) – 3:55
11. "Dead Days in the Kitchen" (Ross/Juliano) – 3:53
12. "Things I Stole" – 2:52

== Album credits ==
- Jason Ross – lead vocals, rhythm guitar
- Thomas Juliano – lead guitar, backing vocals
- Casey Daniel – bass
- Giti Khalsa – drums
- Brian Paulson – keyboards
- Lee Waters – drums on "Last Kiss" and "Laughing Out Loud"
- The Poplar Sisters – backing vocals on "Stomps on "Dreaming Against Me"

=== Production ===
- Producers: Jason Ross, Thomas Juliano, and Brian Paulson
- Engineering: Brian Paulson and Thomas Juliano
- Mixing: Brian Paulson
- Mastering: Alan Douches
- Art Direction: Lane Wurster
- Graphic Design: Phillip Dwyer
- Photography: Josh Rothstein
