= Left-hand muting =

Performance technique for stringed instruments

Left-hand muting is a performance technique for stringed instruments, where string vibration is damped by the fingering hand. (Left-handed players use the right hand.)

== First variant ==
A string is played with the right hand, while the left hand presses the string against the neck. Lifting the left hand stops or suppresses the resonating string.

Strumming barre chords or other chords in which there are no open strings, left-hand muting may punctuate the rhythm, so that instead of the continuous ringing sound of the strumming, short silences are introduced. Left-hand muting is used to produce chops (chords that are released the instant after picking). Chops are sharp and percussive.

== Second variant ==
A non-vibrating string is pressed partly with the left hand — not to the neck — then struck, plucked or bowed with the other hand. A struck string sound includes a muffled click; a bowed string, a scratchy noise. The string may be touched with the tip of one or more fingers, or with one or more fingers laid flat across the neck. If muted strings are played with a single stroke, hitting a non-muted strings loud and clear, the result is a rake, where muted notes act as a percussive lead to the main note.

== See also ==
- Palm mute
