= Johan Frandsen =

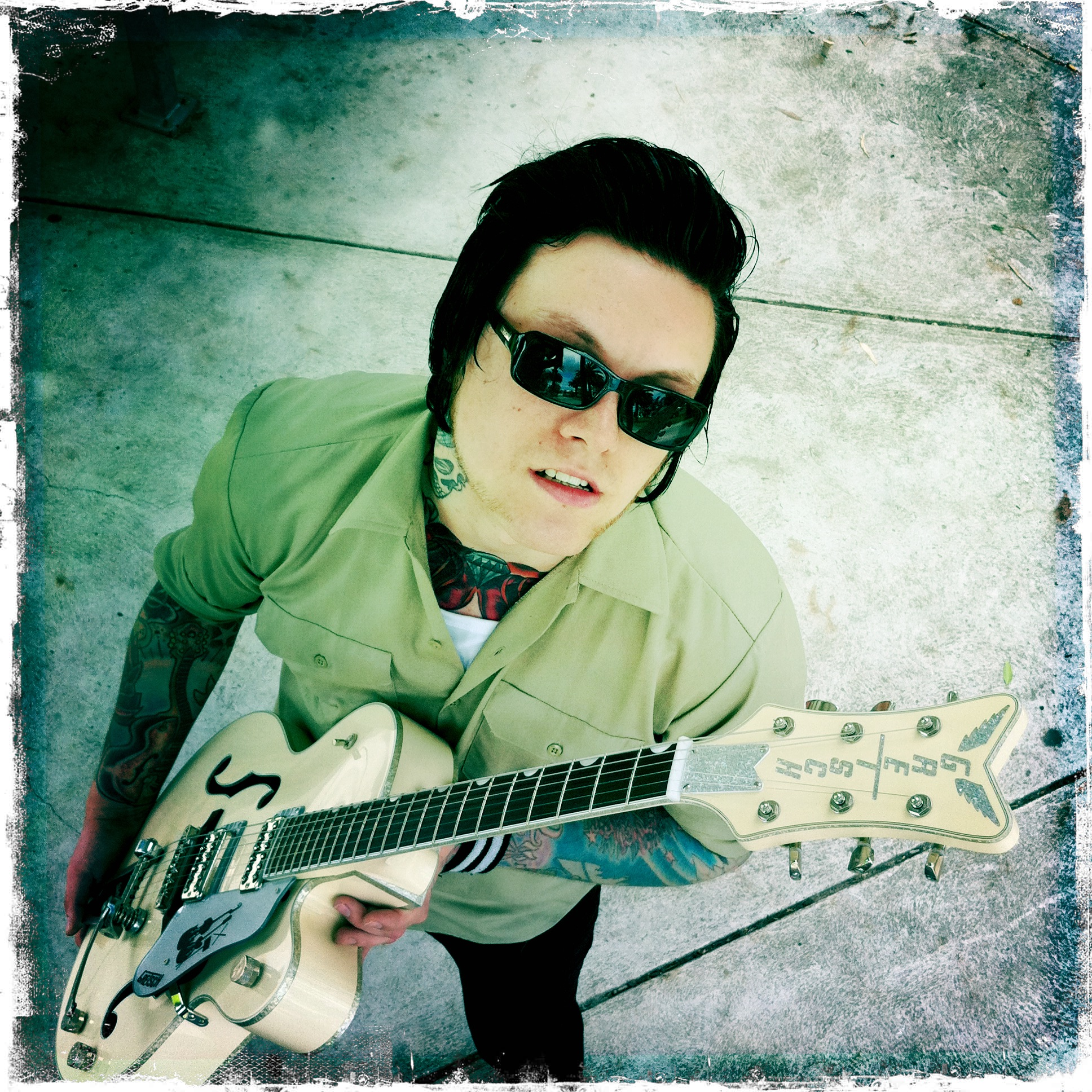
- Johan Frandsen, Frontman from Swedish band, The Knockouts

Background information
- Born: Johan Frandsen; 9 September 1982 (age 44); Stockholm, Sweden
- Genres: Rockabilly; Punk rock Alternative rock
- Occupations: Musician, Songwriter
- Instruments: Vocals, Guitar
- Years active: 1996–present
- Labels: Diamond Prime; Sound Pollution
- Website: The Knockouts Official website

Johan Frandsen (born 9 September 1982 in Stockholm, Sweden), is the frontman guitarist, main songwriter and lead vocalist in the Swedish rock band, The Knockouts.

== Biography ==
=== Music career ===
Frandsen started playing guitar at the age of six and began his music career forming The Knockouts in 1996 in Stockholm, Sweden.

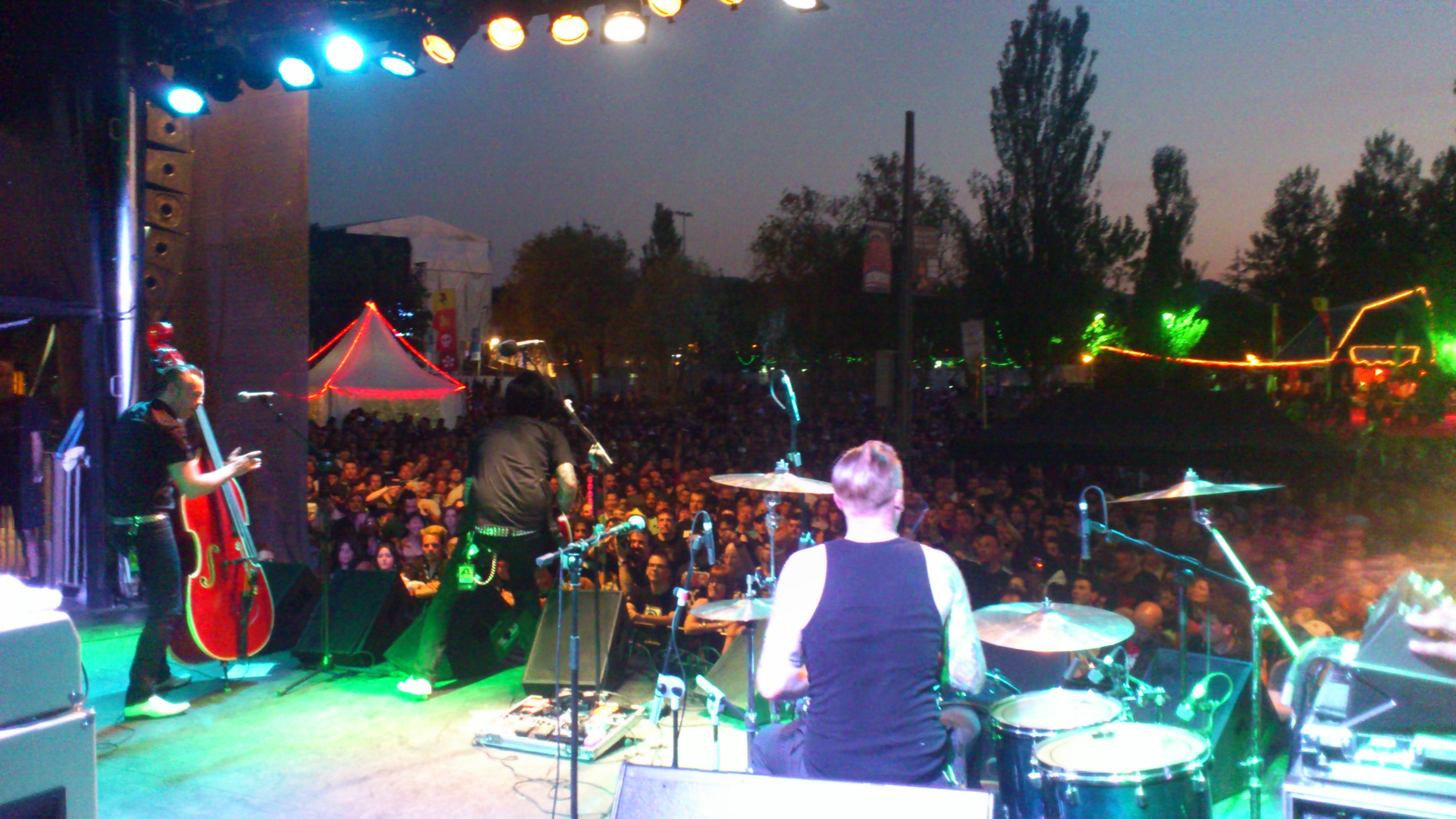
The Knockouts on stage at the Azkena Rock Festival 25 June 2011

=== The Knockouts ===
The Knockouts are a Swedish rock band from Stockholm, formed in 1996. The current lineup consists of Frandsen (vocals, guitar), Kennet Stone (double bass, vocals) and Ted Jergelind (drums). The band grew in popularity in 2010 after the release of the album Among the Vultures. They have released three studio albums and one EP compilation in Sweden and throughout Europe. The album Among the Vultures was nominated for Best Punk Rock Album at the 2011 Independent Music Awards, and two singles from the album were nominated for best punk song "Heat for the Hunted" and best alternative country song "Ever Been Hurt". The Knockouts added BEST Punk Rock Album to their collection as voted by the industry panel including Joe Perry, Aerosmith, Benji Madden & Joel Madden, Good Charlotte, and Ozzy Osbourne.

=== The Knockouts - recent activity ===
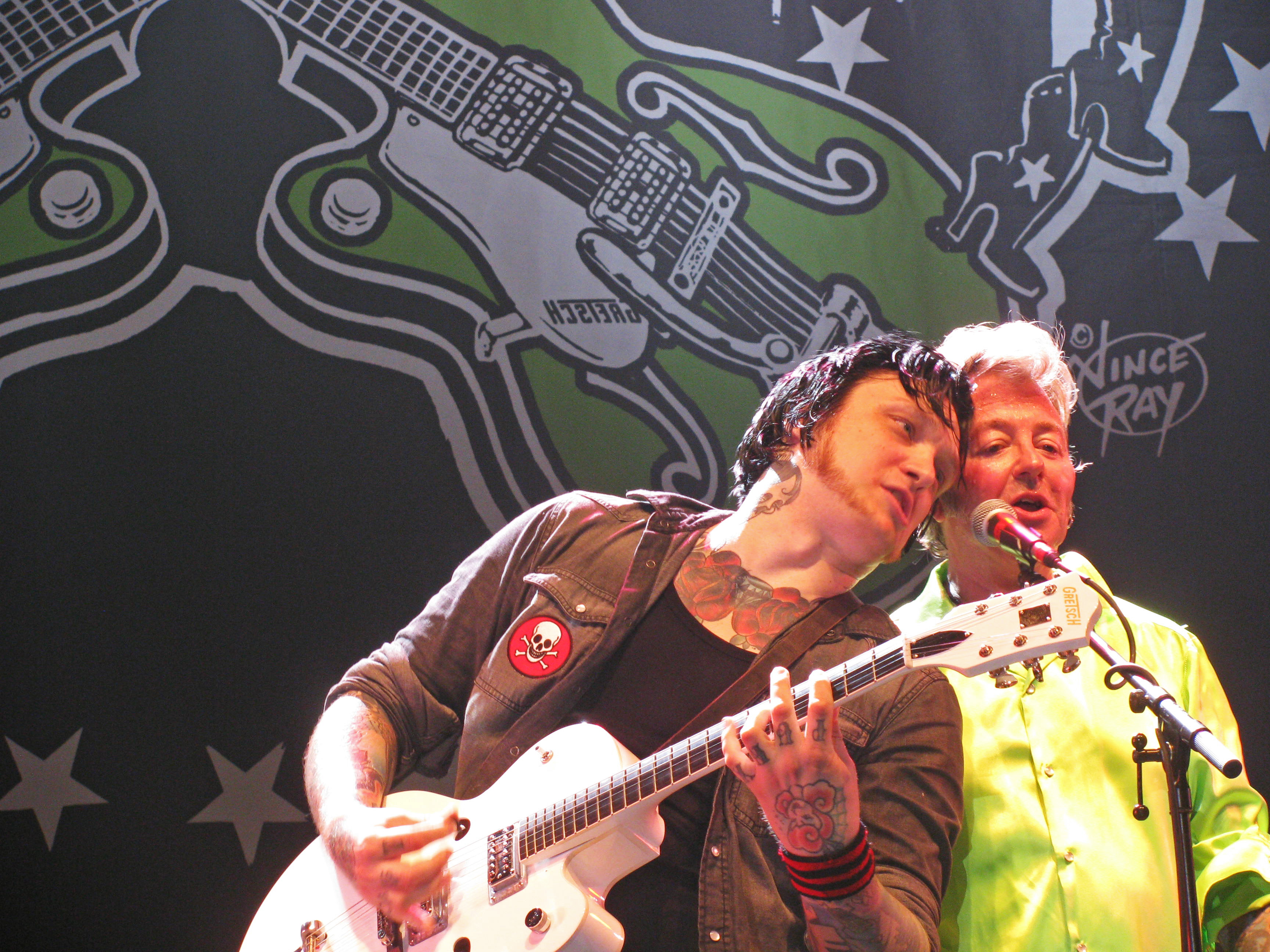
Johan Frandsen and Brian Setzer on stage at the Helsinki Ice Hall, Finland, July 2011 as part of the European leg of the Brian Sezter Rockabilly Riot 2011

In 2014, The Knockouts released a studio album, 5000 Miles from Louisville.

In 2011, the Knockouts supported rock and roll icon and Stray Cats front man Brian Setzer, on the 'Brian Setzer's Rockabilly Riot tour 2011'

They started the European summer with a performance with Brian Sezter on the premiere night of his tour at the 10 year celebration of the Azkena Rock Festival on the June 25, Vitoria-Gasteiz, Spain to crowds of over 50,000 people, then onto sold out dates throughout Germany in Berlin, Hamburg and Cologne. The tour continued to be sold out through Scandinavia with dates in Copenhagen, Denmark, Stockholm, Sweden and Helsinki, Finland ending at the Helsinki Ice Hall (venue capacity of 8200) in Helsinki.

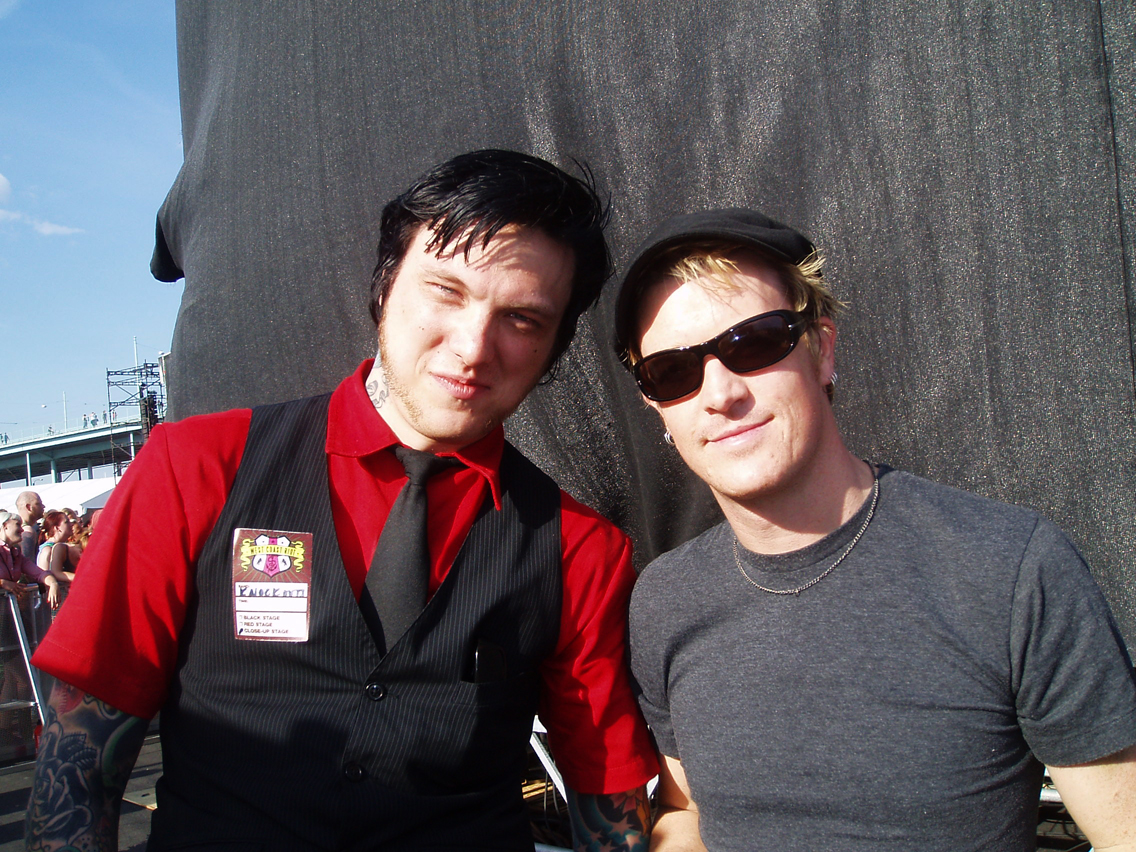
Johan Frandsen, The Knockouts(Sweden) with Chris Cheney, The Living End (Australia) at the West Coast Riot Festival, Gothenburg, Sweden, 2009.

The Knockouts' tours have included dates throughout Europe including countries such as, Sweden, Finland, Denmark, Germany, Finland, Czech Republic and Spain.

They have played at festivals such as the West Coast Riot and The Peace and Love Festival, alongside Brian Setzer, Social Distortion and The Living End. They supported The Living End in 2009 on their first Scandinavian tour date for the 'Raise the Alarm World Tour' – in Stockholm.

=== The Knockouts' beginnings (1996–2002) ===
Formed by Frandsen in 1996. Their self-titled debut 7 inch single in 1998 was The Knockouts, produced by Thomas Skogsberg. 1999 to 2001 was spent touring, writing and preparing to record the album Skyline Supernova, recorded in Sunlight Studio, Sweden and released in summer 2000, and various compilation recordings, including A Fistfull of Rock, Devil Doll Records.

=== The Knockouts self-titled EP (2003–2005) ===
I'm 2003 the trio went onto solidify its sound with the introduction of longtime drummer Ted Jergelind. Early 2004 saw them head into the studio and record the 4 track EP self-titled The Knockouts. While writing new material during 2004–2006 for their second album and touring Sweden, Germany, Spain, Frandsen (lead vocals, guitar) toured over 300 dates with Swedish rockabilly band, The GoGetters'.

=== El Fin de la Guerra (2006–2008) ===
In the midst of a relentless touring schedule between 2006–2008, new songs were bubbling to the surface in what would become El Fin De La Guerra. Recorded in October 2007 and released February 1, 2008 this new album saw the band fly into a Europe and USA tour including planned dates in Sweden, Germany, Czech Republic, Finland and the West Coast of the United States. Endorsement deals sees a trademark white guitar appear on stage at the start of 2009 and Frandsen appearing at both National and International guitar conventions. They were busy on the festival circuit in the summer of 2009, including playing Earth Hour in Stockholm, then with The Living End and Social Distortion at The Westcoast Riot festival and the Peace and Love Festival.

=== Among the Vultures (2009–2011) ===
Among the Vultures, was recorded and produced in six days at The Panic Room, Skara, Sweden. This album received multiple accolades and reviews; ...This album won't leave lovers of quality rock unmoved. It is just so tight, intense, messy, expressive, powerful, explosive... The official single, "Under the Light" is attracting radio play and reviews both in Scandinavia, USA and Europe. The song "Heat for the Hunted" was chosen 3rd on Sweden's National Radio Program - Håkan Persson's Sveriges Radio P3 as the best top ten songs for 2009

=== 5000 Miles From Louisville (2012–2014) ===
2012 to 2013 saw the band working on a new album. 5000 Miles From Louisville, was recorded and mixed in ten days in February 2013 at Park Studio Stockholm, Sweden. It was produced by Stefan Boman, of Park Studio (owned by Swedish band Kent) and Frandsen of the Knockouts. This album received radio plays and reviews: for instance, Jim Ody of the website RoomThirteen reviewed the album positively, saying: "It's accessible, but multi-layered so as once the catchiness of the beats and melodies grab you, the lyrics hold on tight and refuse to let you go."

The single "Days Long Gone" was released as part of the group's debut recordings. Music critics noted the track's production and songwriting, comparing the Scandinavian trio's performance to established acts in the genre.

The album also featured Kevin McKendree on piano on the song “Stars of Us”.

== Awards and nominations ==
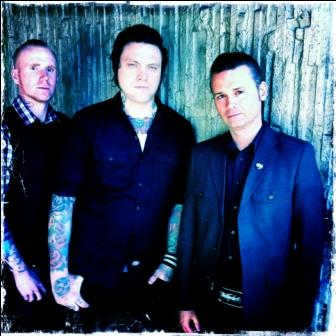
The Knockouts band members, left to right: Ted Jergelind, Johan Frandsen, Kennet Stone

- 2011: The Knockouts' Among the Vultures was nominated for Best Punk Rock Album at the Independent Music Awards, and two singles from the album were nominated for best punk song Heat for the Hunted and best alternative country song Ever Been Hurt. The Knockouts added BEST Punk Rock Album to their collection as voted by the industry panel including Joe Perry of Aerosmith, Benji Madden and Joel Madden, Good Charlotte, and Ozzy Osbourne.
- 2010: The Knockouts were nominated as best upcoming act at the Bandit Rock Awards (Sweden's biggest rock radio station).
- 2009: "Heat for the Hunted" from the album Among the Vultures was chosen 3rd on Sweden's National Radio Program Håkan Persson's Sveriges Radio P3 as the best top ten songs for 2009.

== Endorsements ==
Frandsen is currently endorsed artist with:

- Gretsch Guitars
- TV Jones Guitars
- Fender
- Tube Amp Doctor
- Jam Gitarrer

== Equipment ==
2010 saw Frandsen debut as an endorsed artist with TV Jones guitars as a featured artist on the website with Brian Setzer, Chris Cheney and Billy Gibbons. This was soon followed up by support and endorsement from Fender and Gretsch. Frandsen is featured in a two-page spread in FUZZ Magazine June, 2011 issue #4 - The number one and only guitar magazine in Scandinavia. Talking about his inspiration.

On tour, Frandsen uses four main guitars on tour, two Gretsch Guitars and two TV Jones Spectra Sonic Supremes’ and the rest are back-ups for the different tunings.

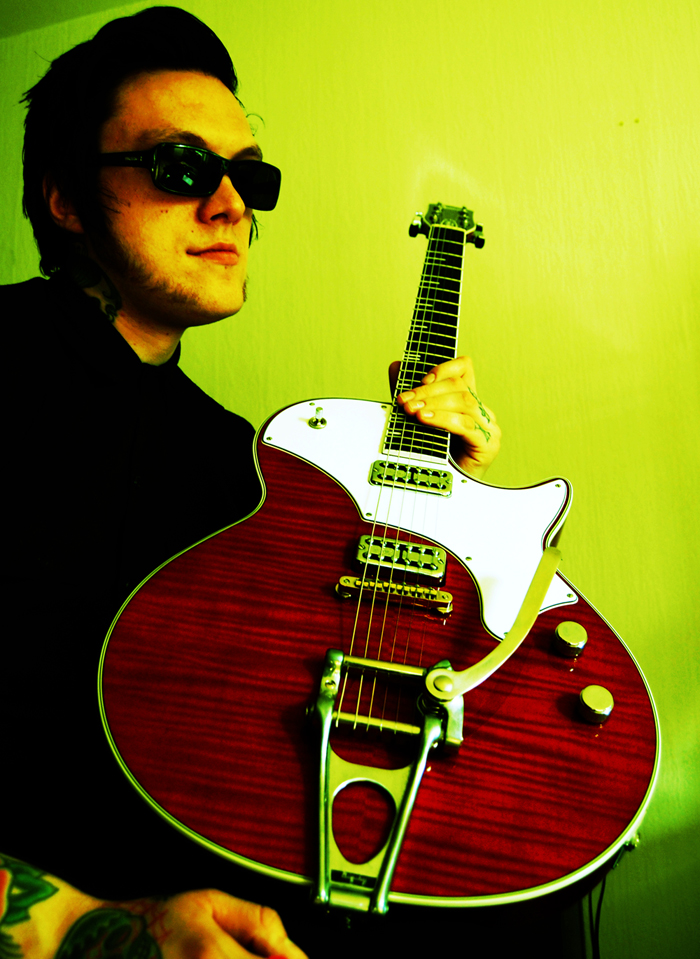
Johan Frandsen with his TV Jones Spectra Sonic Supreme Guitar, 2010

== Guitars ==
- Gretsch Chris Cheney Signature G6126TCC
- Gretsch Prototype GGP 6120 TM (Tiger Maple)
- Gretsch Model 6120 Setzer Hot Rod Custom "Pinstripe"
- TV Jones Spectra Sonic Supreme Guitar - Charcoal
- TV Jones Spectra Sonic Supreme Guitar - Cherry Red
- Various other Gretsch, Guild & Gibson Models

Effects:

- Roland Re-301 Chorus Echo

Amplifiers:

- Fender Bassman(Blonde) - 1963
- Fender Supersonic 60 head

== Discography ==
=== Studio albums ===
- 2000: Skyline Supernova
- 2004: The Knockouts EP Diamond Prime Music
- 2007: El Fin de la Guerra
- 2009: Among the Vultures Diamond Prime Music / Sound Pollution AB
- 2013: 5000 Miles From Louisville Diamond Prime Music / Sound Pollution AB

=== Singles ===
- 1998: "The Knockouts - Can I Look But Not Touch 7" Vinyl
- 2009: "Under the Light" Diamond Prime Music / Sound Pollution AB
- 2010: "Ever Been Hurt" Diamond Prime Music / Sound Pollution AB
- 2011: "A lie like in Natalie" Diamond Prime Music / Sound Pollution AB
- 2011: "I Want you to want me" Diamond Prime Music / Sound Pollution AB
- 2013: Days Long Gone Diamond Prime Music / Sound Pollution AB

=== Compilations ===
- 1998: Fistful of Rock 'N' Roll vol. 9. The Knockouts (Stripshow A Go-Go / Devil Doll Records)
- 2011: Dancing on Your Graves – A Rockabilly Tribute to The Hellacopters, The Knockouts', Freeway To Hell (Wild Kingdom/Sound Pollution)

=== Other projects ===
- 2008: The GoGetters "Hot Rod Roadeo" Goofin Records, Title track from the album Hot Rod Roadeo
