= Among the Vultures =

Among the Vultures The Knockouts
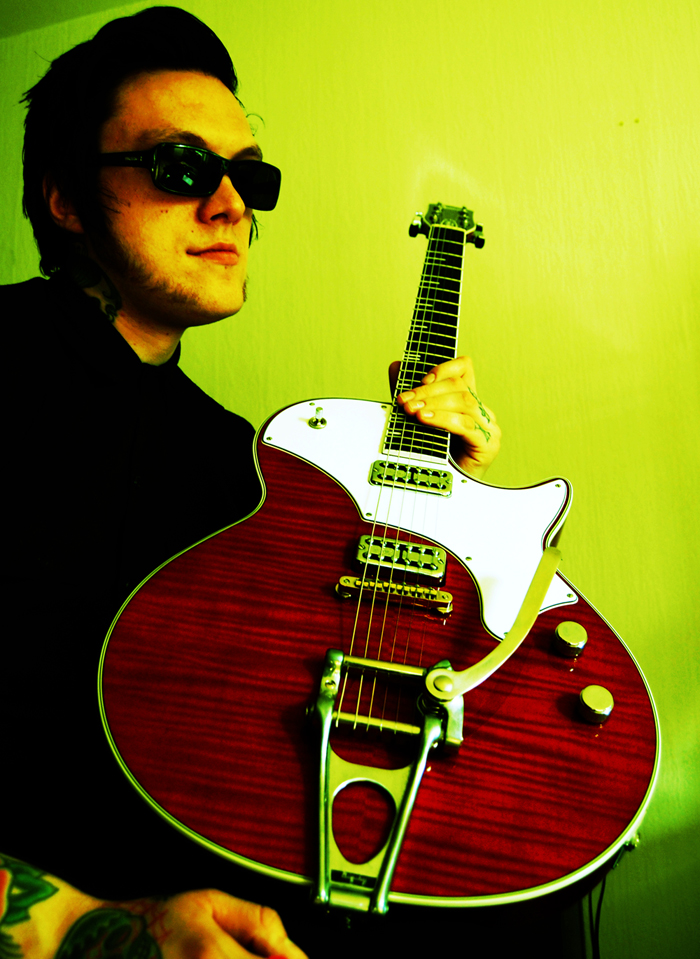
- Johan Frandsen, Frontman from Swedish band, The Knockouts

Studio album by The Knockouts
- Released: November 2009 (Sweden); March 2010 (Worldwide)
- Recorded: September 2009 at The Panic Room, Skara, Sweden
- Genre: Punk, alternative rock, rock 'n' roll, rockabilly, punkabilly
- Length: 44:26
- Label: Diamond Prime Music; Sound Pollution AB
- Producer: Plec & The Knockouts

The Knockouts chronology
El Fin De la Guerra (2007)	Among the Vultures; The Knockouts (2009)	I want you to want me (2011)

Singles from Among the Vultures
- 1. "Under the Light" Released: 13 November 2009; 2. "Ever Been Hurt" Released: 9 March 2010; 3. "A lie like in Natalie" Released: 27 October 2010

Among the Vultures is the Independent Music Awards-winning third studio album by Swedish punk rock band, The Knockouts, released in Sweden 13 November 2009 and worldwide March 2010. It was released by Diamond Prime and distributed worldwide by Sound Pollution/Diamond Prime, Sweden.

== Background ==
The Knockouts were formed by Johan Frandsen in 1996 in Stockholm, Sweden. The current lineup consists of Johan Frandsen (Vocals, Guitar), Kennet Stone (double bass, vocals) and Ted Jergelind, (drums). The band has risen to fame in 2010 after the release of the album Among the Vultures. The Knockouts have released three studio albums and one EP compilation in Sweden, throughout Europe and Worldwide.

Among the Vultures, was recorded and produced in nine days at The Panic Room, Skara, Sweden. The song "Heat for the Hunted" was chosen 3rd on Sweden's National Radio Program – Håkan Persson's Sveriges Radio P3 as the best top ten songs for 2009.

The album Among the Vultures was nominated for Best Punk Rock Album at the 2011 Independent Music Awards, and two singles from the album were nominated for best punk song Heat for the Hunted and best alternative country song Ever Been Hurt. The Knockouts added BEST Punk Rock Album to their collection as voted by the industry panel including Joe Perry of Aerosmith, Benji Madden & Joel Madden, Good Charlotte, and Ozzy Osbourne.

=== Pre-recording ===
The Knockouts have gained a reputation as one of Sweden's hardest touring bands and in the midst of a relentless touring schedule between 2006 and 2008, new songs were bubbling to the surface in what would become El Fin de la Guerra. Recorded October 2007 and released 1 Feb 2008 this album saw the band fly into a massive Europe and USA tour including planned dates in Sweden, Germany, Czech Republic, Finland, and the West Coast of the United States. Endorsement deals from Jam Music and Peerless Guitars sees a trademark white guitar appear on stage at the start of 2009 and Johan Frandsen supporting Jam/Peerless at both National and International guitar conventions.

The Knockouts continued on the festival circuit in the summer of 2009, including playing Earth Hour in Stockholm, then with The Living End and Social Distortion at The Westcoast Riot festival, and the Peace and Love Festival.

=== Recording and production ===
Among the Vultures, was recorded and produced in nine days at The Panic Room, Skara, Sweden, By Plec and The Knockouts. Having performed hundreds of jam-packed and sold-out shows over the last years, The Knockouts have gained a reputation of delivering, what is now described as a "cocky punk rock" sound with an aggressive rockabilly technique. The Knockouts captured their live sound inside the studio at The Panic Room. Plec is notable for his work with high-profile bands in Scandinavia and The Panic Room has recorded produced mixed and mastered multiple gold record artists

Professional ratings
Review scores
Source	Rating
Uber Rock	5/5 stars
Hard Rock Haven	4/5 stars
Room Thirteen	13/13 stars
Nya Skivor	4/5 stars
Twist Magazine	7/10 stars
Ikon Magazine	4/5 stars

=== Awards and nominations ===
- The Knockouts Among the Vultures was nominated for Best Punk Rock Album at the 2011 Independent Music Awards, and two singles from the album were nominated for best punk song "Heat for the Hunted" and best alternative country song "Ever Been Hurt". 'The Knockouts added BEST Punk Rock Album to their collection as voted by the industry panel including Joe Perry, Aerosmith, Benji Madden and Joel Madden, Good Charlotte, and Ozzy Osbourne.
- "Heat for the Hunted" from the album Among the Vultures was chosen 3rd on Sweden's National Radio Program Håkan Persson's Sveriges Radio P3 as the best top ten songs for 2009.
- The Knockouts were nominated as best upcoming act at the Bandit Rock Awards (Sweden's biggest rock radio station).

=== Recent activity ===
In 2011 The Knockouts supported rock and roll icon and Stray Cats front man Brian Setzer, on the Brian Setzer's Rockabilly Riot tour 2011

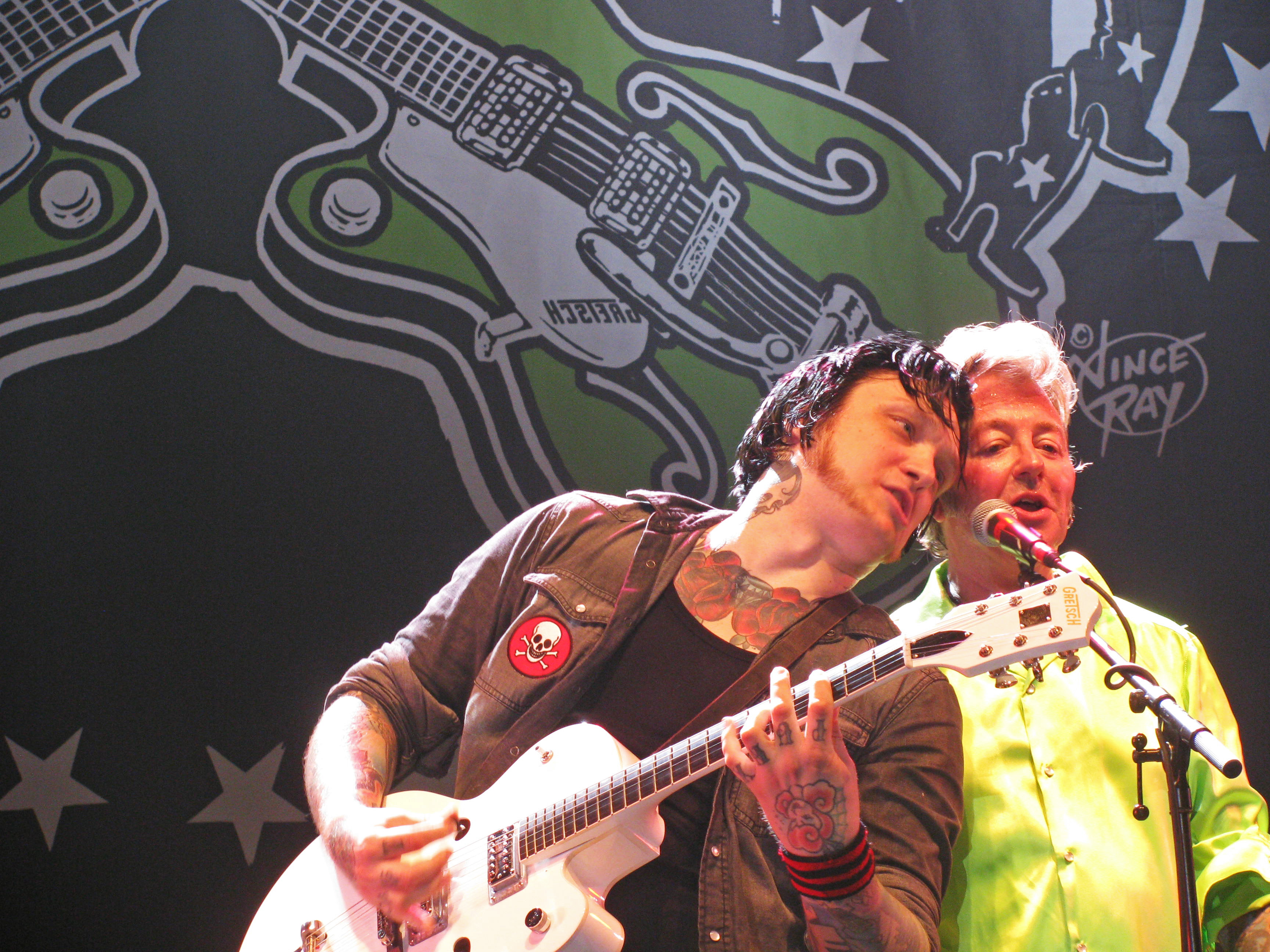
Johan Frandsen and Brian Setzer on stage at the Helsinki Ice Hall, Finland, July 2011 as part of the European leg of the Brian Sezter Rockabilly Riot 2011

They started the European summer with a performance with Brian Sezter on the premiere night of his tour at the 10-year celebration of the Azkena Rock Festival on 25 June, Vitoria-Gasteiz, Spain to crowds of over 50,000 people, then onto sold out dates throughout Germany in Berlin, Hamburg and Cologne. The tour continued to be sold out through Scandinavia with dates in Copenhagen, Denmark, Stockholm, Sweden and Helsinki, Finland ending at the Helsinki Ice Hall (Venue Capacity of 8200) in Helsinki, Finland.

Highlight of the tour was the encore performance at the Helsinki Ice Hall on the last night of the tour when Johan Frandsen joined Brian Setzer and Slim Jim Phantom on stage with a special rendition of the rockabilly classic, "Seven Nights to Rock". Setzer called Frandsen to the stage and handed his white Brian Setzer Hot Rod signature Gretsch Guitar to Johan to conclude the tour in Scandinavia.

The Knockouts' tours have included dates throughout Europe including countries such as, Sweden, Finland, Denmark, Germany, Finland, Czech Republic and Spain.

They have played at festivals such as the West Coast Riot and The Peace and Love Festival, alongside Brian Setzer, Social Distortion and The Living End. They supported The Living End in 2009 on their first Scandinavian tour date for the Raise the Alarm World Tour – in Stockholm.

Frontman Johan Frandsen has also played with members of the Stray Cats, Guana Batz, Mad Sin and gave the Swedish rockabilly band The GoGetters an extra injection of energy in over 300 gigs.

2012 saw The Knockouts working on new material for the upcoming album, during this time, illness within the band meant that touring schedules were kept to a minimum and work was directed to the songs for the new release (Due early 2013). A special event was held in September 2012 at Debaser Slussen Stockholm, Sweden. Slim Jim Phantom from the world-famous Stray Cats and Jonny Bowler from the Guana Batz flew from Los Angeles to join The Knockouts on stage in a once only special event to a soldout show, celebrating Johan Frandsen's 30th birthday.

In 2013 and 2014, The Knockouts have worked to rehearse, record and release the newest studio album ‘’'5000 Miles from Louisville'’, having signed with Swedish Booking Agency MTA Production AB.

== Members ==
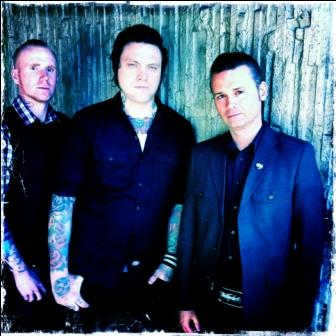
The Knockouts band members, Ted Jergelind, Johan Frandsen, Kennet Stone

=== Current ===
- Johan Frandsen – Guitar, vocals (1996–present)
- Kennet Stone – Double bass, backing vocals (2009–present)
- Ted Jergelind – Drums, backing vocals (2003–present)

=== Former ===
- Mike Brunkvist Electric bass (1997–2008)
- Ville Drums (1996–2003)

== Track listing ==
No.	Title	Length
1.	"Heat for the Hunted"	2:55
2.	"Under the Light"	2:32
3.	"A Lie Like in Natalie"	2:32
4.	"Queen of the Underground"	3:21
5.	"The Chimneys of Chemnitz"	3:16
6.	"Faith Avenue"	3:06
7.	"Ever Been Hurt"	3:05
8.	"Another Second, Another Minute, Another Day"	3:44
9.	"Rotten and Obsessed"	3:49
10.	"Streets of Stockholm"	2:42
11.	"Time and Motions"	2:57
12.	"Here's a Song"	5:00

== Personnel ==
- Johan Frandsen – Vocals, Guitar
- Kennet Stone – Double bass, Backing Vocals
- Ted Jergelind – Drums, Backing Vocals
- Anders Borg – Horns
- Recorded, Mixed and Mastered by: The Knockouts & Plec
- Produced by: The Knockouts & Plec producer
- Cover Design: Danne Kion, Svenja May and The Knockouts
- Logotype artwork by: Bluebird Tattoo
- Photos by: Diamond Prime and F Goingberg
- Band Manager: Coco Rosenfeld, Diamond Prime Music.

== Discography ==
=== Studio albums ===
- 2000: Skyline Supernova
- 2004: The Knockouts EP Diamond Prime Music
- 2007: El Fin de la Guerra
- 2009: Among the Vultures Diamond Prime Music / Sound Pollution AB
- 2013: 5000 Miles From Louisville Diamond Prime Music / Sound Pollution AB

=== Singles ===
- 1998: "The Knockouts – Can I Look But Not Touch 7" Vinyl
- 2009: "Under the Light" Diamond Prime Music / Sound Pollution AB
- 2010: "Ever Been Hurt" Diamond Prime Music / Sound Pollution AB
- 2011: "A lie like in Natalie" Diamond Prime Music / Sound Pollution AB
- 2011: "I Want you to want me" Diamond Prime Music / Sound Pollution AB
- 2013: Days Long Gone Diamond Prime Music / Sound Pollution AB

=== Compilations ===
- 1998: Fistful of Rock 'N' Roll vol. 9. The Knockouts (Stripshow A Go-Go / Devil Doll Records)
- 2011: Dancing on Your Graves – A Rockabilly Tribute to The Hellacopters, The Knockouts, Freeway To Hell (Wild Kingdom/Sound Pollution)
