= The Knockouts =

Swedish rock band

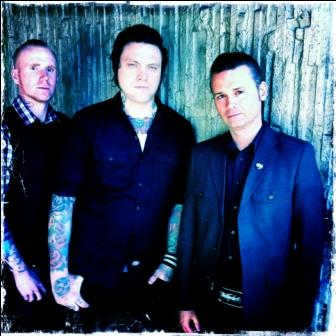
- Left to right: Ted Jergelind, Johan Frandsen, Kennet Stone

Background information
- Origin: Stockholm, Sweden
- Genres: Punk, alternative rock, rock 'n' roll, rockabilly, punkabilly
- Years active: 1996–present
- Labels: Diamond Prime Music; Sound Pollution AB
- Members: Johan Frandsen; Ted Jergelind; Kennet Stone
- Past members: Mike Brunkvist
- Website: theknockouts.com

The Knockouts are a Swedish rock band from Stockholm that formed in 1996.

The current line-up consists of Johan Frandsen (vocals, guitar), Kennet Stone (double bass, vocals) and Ted Jergelind, (Drums). The band achieved success in 2010 after the release of the album Among the Vultures.

They have released four studio albums and one EP compilation in Sweden and Europe.

== Recent activity ==
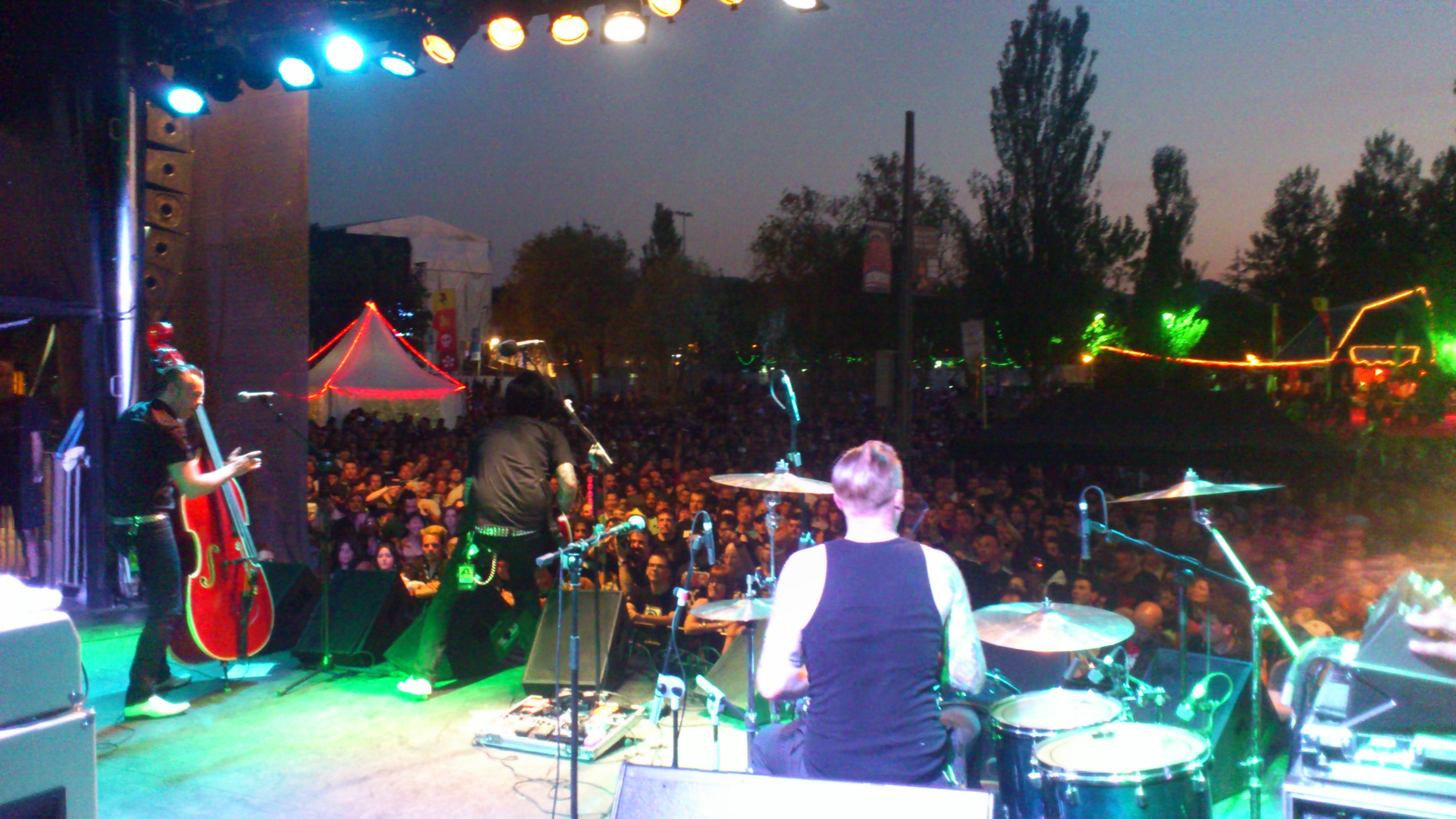
The Knockouts on stage at the Azkena Rock Festival 25 June 2011

In 2013 and 2014, The Knockouts have worked to rehearse, record and release the newest studio album 5000 Miles from Louisville, having signed with Swedish Booking Agency MTA Production AB,

In 2012, The Knockouts worked on new material for an upcoming album. During that time, touring schedules to a minimum, and the band directed work to the new release. They held a special event in September 2012 at Debaser Slussen Stockholm, Sweden. Slim Jim Phantom from the Stray Cats and Jonny Bowler from the Guana Batz flew from Los Angeles to join The Knockouts on stage in a special sold-out show that celebrated Johan Frandsen's 30th birthday.

In 2011, The Knockouts supported Brian Setzer on the 'Brian Setzer's Rockabilly Riot tour 2011'.

The European summer started with a performance with Brian Sezter on the premiere night of his tour at the 10-year celebration of the Azkena Rock Festival on 25 June, Vitoria-Gasteiz, Spain to crowds of over 50,000 people, then onto sold out dates throughout Germany in Berlin, Hamburg and Cologne. The tour was sold out through Scandinavia, with dates in Copenhagen, Denmark, Stockholm, Sweden, and Helsinki.

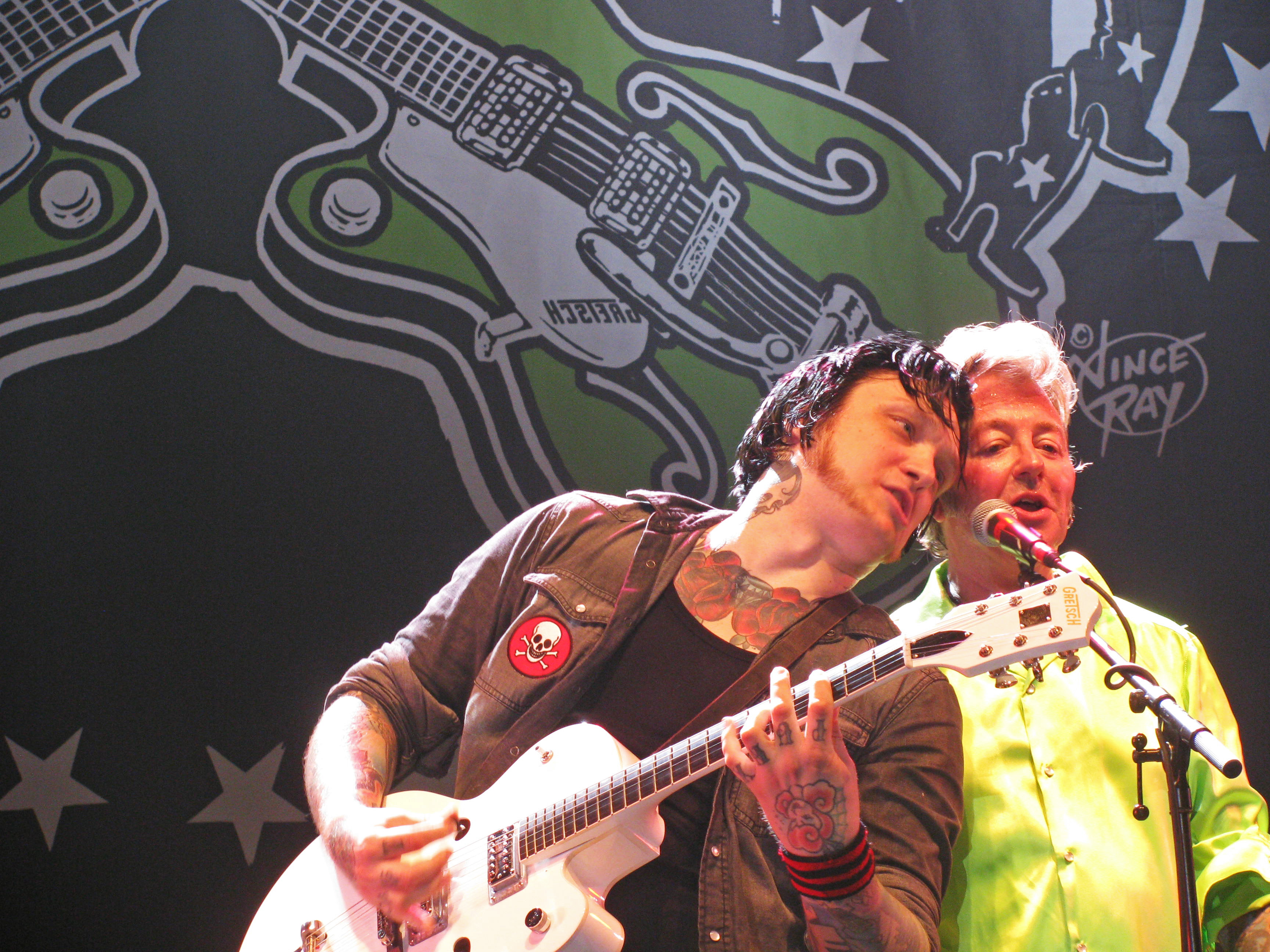
Johan Frandsen and Brian Setzer on stage at the Helsinki Ice Hall, Finland, July 2011 as part of the European leg of the Brian Sezter Rockabilly Riot 2011

A highlight of the tour was an encore performance at the Helsinki Ice Hall on the last night of the tour. The Knockouts frontman Johan Frandsen joined Brian Setzer and Slim Jim Phantom on stage with a special rendition of "Seven Nights to Rock". Setzer called Frandsen to the stage and handed his white Brian Setzer Hot Rod signature Gretsch guitar to Frandsen to conclude the tour in Scandinavia.

The Knockouts' tours have included dates throughout Europe including countries such as, Sweden, Finland, Denmark, Germany, Finland, Czech Republic and Spain. They have played at festivals such as the West Coast Riot and The Peace and Love Festival, alongside Brian Setzer, Social Distortion and The Living End. They supported The Living End in 2009 on their first Scandinavian tour date for the Raise the Alarm World Tour in Stockholm, Sweden. Frontman Johan Frandsen has also played with members of the Stray Cats, Guana Batz, Mad Sin and gave the Swedish rockabilly band The GoGetters an injection of energy in over 300 gigs.

== History ==
=== The beginnings (1996–2002) ===
Formed by Johan Frandsen in 1996, their energetic and hard-fought beginnings were captured with the release of their 1998 self-titled debut 7 inch single "The Knockouts", produced by Thomas Skogsberg (The Hellacopters) 1999 to 2001 was spent touring, writing and preparing to record the promotional album Skyline Supernova, recorded in Sunlight Studio, Sweden and released in summer 2000, and various compilation recordings, including A Fistfull of Rock, Devil Doll Records. The success of their album scored them national support and the slot on the Hultsfred Festival, playing in the same year as bands such as Iggy Pop and Rocket from the Crypt.

=== The Knockouts EP (2003–2005) ===
After devouring two years' worth of gigs, and with a different way of looking at the Swedish punk rock scene, and following from the success of Skyline Supernova, in 2003 the trio went onto solidify its sound with the introduction of longtime drummer Ted Jergelind In early 2004, they went into the studio and recorded the four track EP self-titled The Knockouts. While writing new material during 2004–2006 for their second album and touring Sweden, Germany, Spain, Johan Frandsen (lead vocals, guitar) toured over 300 dates with internationally respected Swedish rockabilly band, The GoGetters.

The tour included shows all over Europe and the USA—headlining at the Viva Las Vegas, supporting Stray Cats members, and playing with members of Mad Sin and Guana Batz.

=== El Fin de la Guerra (2006–2008) ===
In the midst of a relentless touring schedule between 2006 and 2008, they wrote new songs for what became the album El Fin de la Guerra. Recorded October 2007 and released 1 February 2008 the band supported the new album with a Europe and US tour that included planned dates in Sweden, Germany, Czech Republic, Finland, and the West Coast of the United States. Endorsement deals led to a trademark white guitar on stage at the start of 2009 and Johan Frandsen appearing at national and international guitar conventions.

They were busy on the festival circuit in the summer of 2009, including playing Earth Hour in Stockholm, then with The Living End and Social Distortion at The Westcoast Riot festival, and the Peace and Love Festival.

=== Among the Vultures (2009–2011) ===
Among the Vultures, was recorded and produced in six days at The Panic Room, Skara, Sweden. The official single, "Under the Light" attracted radio play and reviews both in Scandinavia, USA and Europe. The song "Heat for the Hunted" was third on Sweden's National Radio Program, Håkan Persson's Sveriges Radio P3 as the best top ten songs for 2009

=== 5000 Miles from Louisville (2012–2014) ===
2012 to 2013 saw the band working on the newest album. 5000 Miles from Louisville, was recorded and mixed in ten days in February 2013 at Park Studio, Stockholm. It was produced by Stefan Boman, of Park Studio and Johan Frandsen. This album received radio plays and reviews;

... the catchiness of the beats and melodies grab you, the lyrics hold on tight and refuse to let you go ...

The official single, "...'Days Long Gone" hurtles out of the speakers with a confidence and energy that tells me everything I need to know about this record and that is it's going to compete and there's a strength in the outstanding playing and songwriting that places this Scandinavian three piece right at the top of the pack..."

The albums also featured Kevin McKendree on piano on the song "Stars of Us".

== Awards and nominations ==
The album Among the Vultures was nominated for Best Punk album at the 2011 Independent Music Awards, and two singles from the album were nominated: "Heat for the Hunted" for best punk song and "Ever Been Hurt" for best alt country song.

The Knockouts added Best Punk Rock Album to their collection – as voted by an industry panel that included Joe Perry of Aerosmith, Benji Madden and Joel Madden, Good Charlotte, and Ozzy Osbourne in the Independent Music Awards.

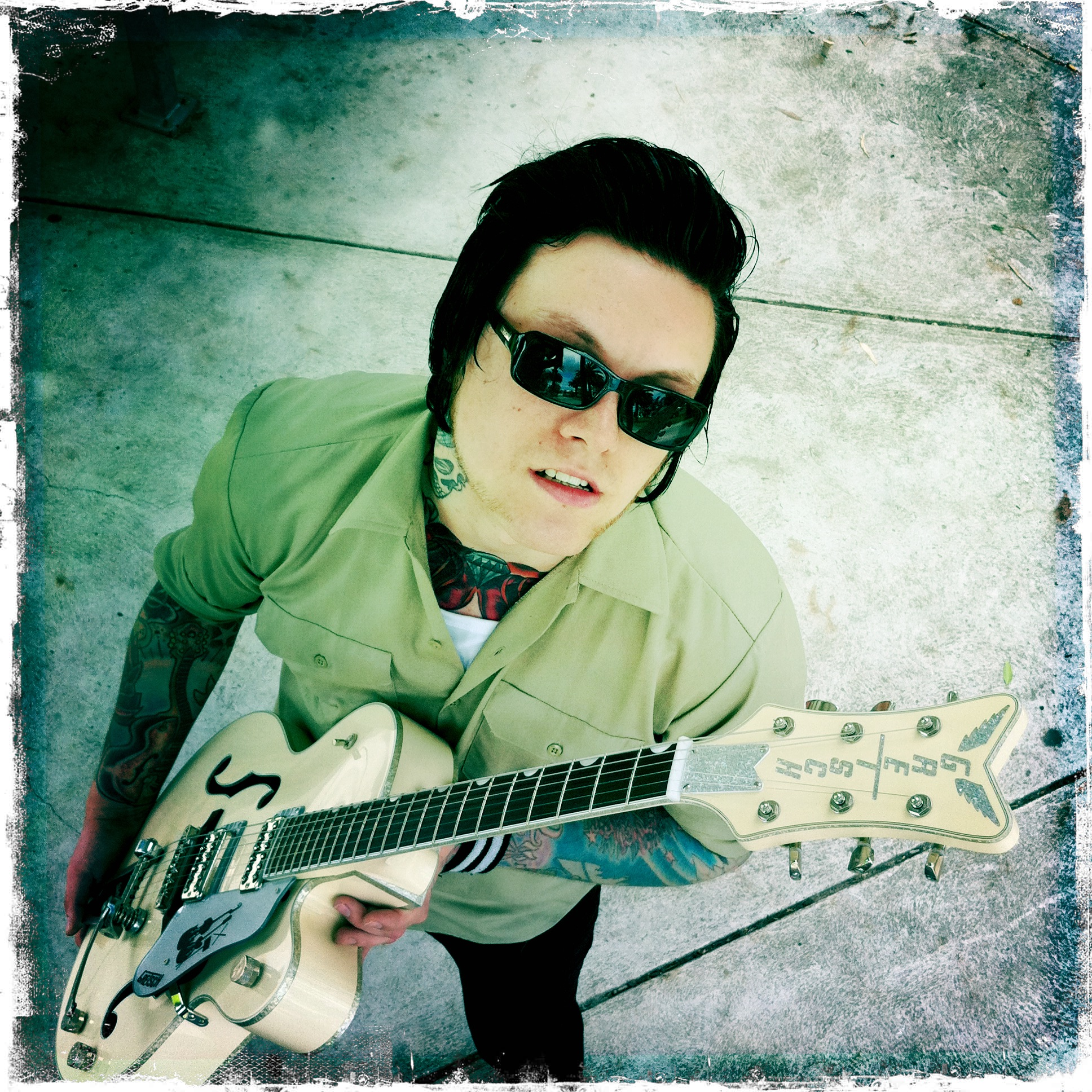
Frontman Johan Frandsen, The Knockouts with his signature Gretsch guitar

== Endorsement ==
In 2010, Frandsen began an endorsement deal with TV Jones guitars as a featured artist on the website with Brian Setzer, Chris Cheney and Billy Gibbons. Support and endorsement deals with Fender and Gretsch Scandinavia followed. Frandsen featured in a two-page spread in Fuzz magazine June 2011 issue No. 4 – the only guitar magazine in Scandinavia.

== Members ==
=== Current ===
- Johan Frandsen – guitar, vocals (1996–present)
- Kennet Stone – double bass, backing vocals (2009–present)
- Ted Jergelind – drums, backing vocals (2003–present)

=== Former ===
- Mike Brunkvist – bass (1997–2008)
- Ville – drums (1996–2003)

== Discography ==
=== Studio albums ===
- 2000: Skyline Supernova
- 2004: The Knockouts EP, Diamond Prime Music
- 2007: El Fin De la Guerra
- 2009: Among the Vultures, Diamond Prime Music / Sound Pollution AB
- 2013: 5000 Miles from Louisville, Diamond Prime Music / Sound Pollution AB

=== Singles ===
- 1998: "The Knockouts – Can I Look But Not Touch", 7" vinyl
- 2009: "Under the Light", Diamond Prime Music / Sound Pollution AB
- 2010: "Ever Been Hurt", Diamond Prime Music / Sound Pollution AB
- 2011: "A Lie Like in Natalie", Diamond Prime Music / Sound Pollution AB
- 2011: "I Want You to Want Me", Diamond Prime Music / Sound Pollution AB
- 2013: "Days Long Gone", Diamond Prime Music / Sound Pollution AB

=== Compilations ===
- 1998: Fistful of Rock 'N' Roll Vol. 9. – The Knockouts (Stripshow A Go-Go / Devil Doll Records)
- 2011: Dancing on Your Graves – A Rockabilly Tribute to The Hellacopters, The Knockouts, Freeway to Hell (Wild Kingdom/Sound Pollution)
