= Helsinki Ice Hall =

Multipurpose arena in Finland

- Helsingin jäähalli (Finnish); Helsingfors ishall (Swedish)
- Nordis, Petoluola
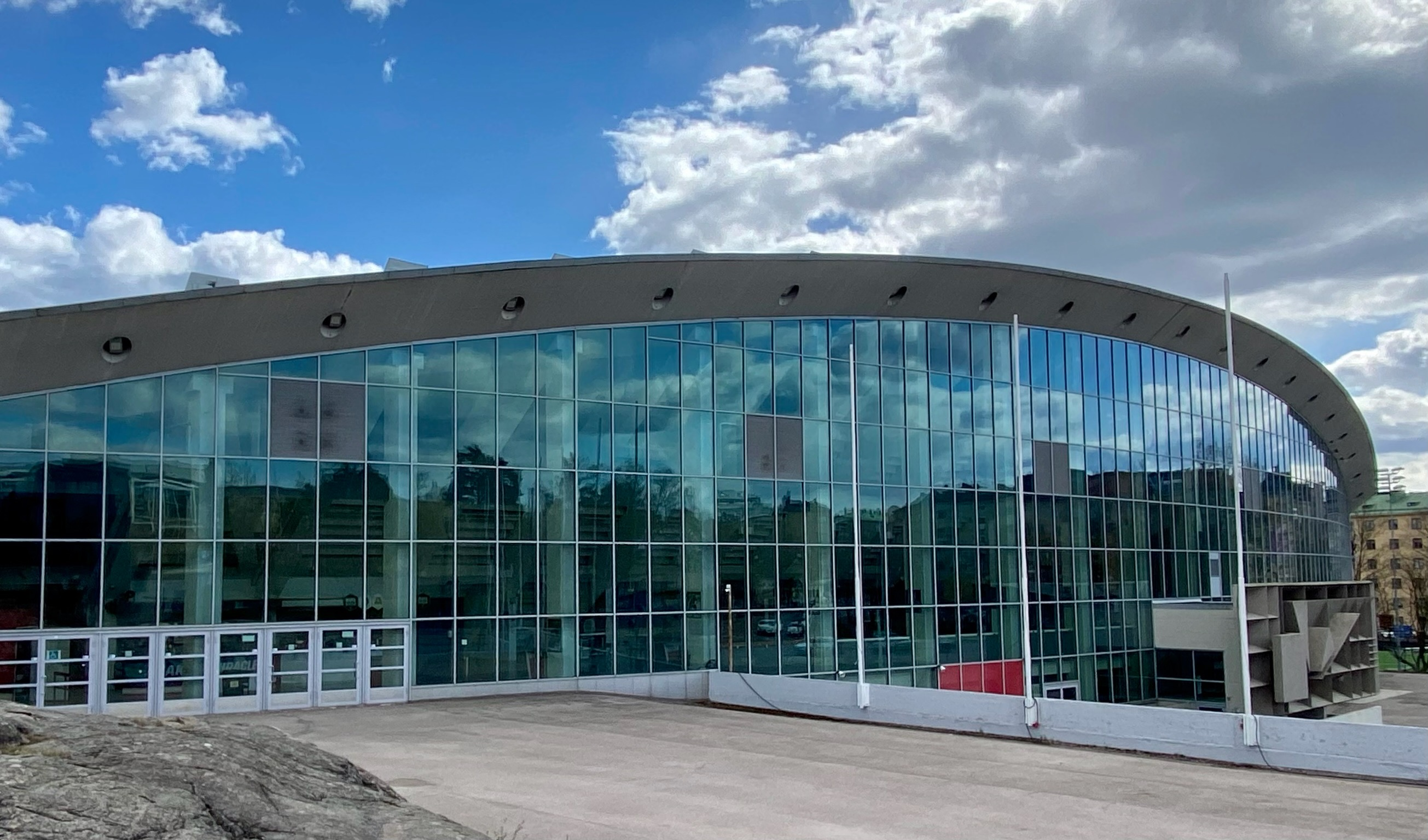
- Exterior of Helsinki Ice Hall in May 2022
- Interactive map of Helsinki Ice Hall
- Address: Nordenskiöldinkatu 11–13
- Location: Helsinki, Finland
- Coordinates: 60°11′21″N 24°55′20″E
- Owner: Jääkenttäsäätiö Ry
- Capacity: 10,500

Construction
- Opened: 1 October 1966
- Architects: Jaakko Kontio, Kauko Räike

Tenants
- HIFK (1966–present); Jokerit (1967–1997, 2023–2026)

The Helsinki Ice Hall (Finnish: Helsingin jäähalli, Swedish: Helsingfors ishall), colloquially called Nordis, is an indoor arena located in the Taka-Töölö neighborhood of Helsinki, Finland. The arena has a seating capacity of 8,200.

== History ==
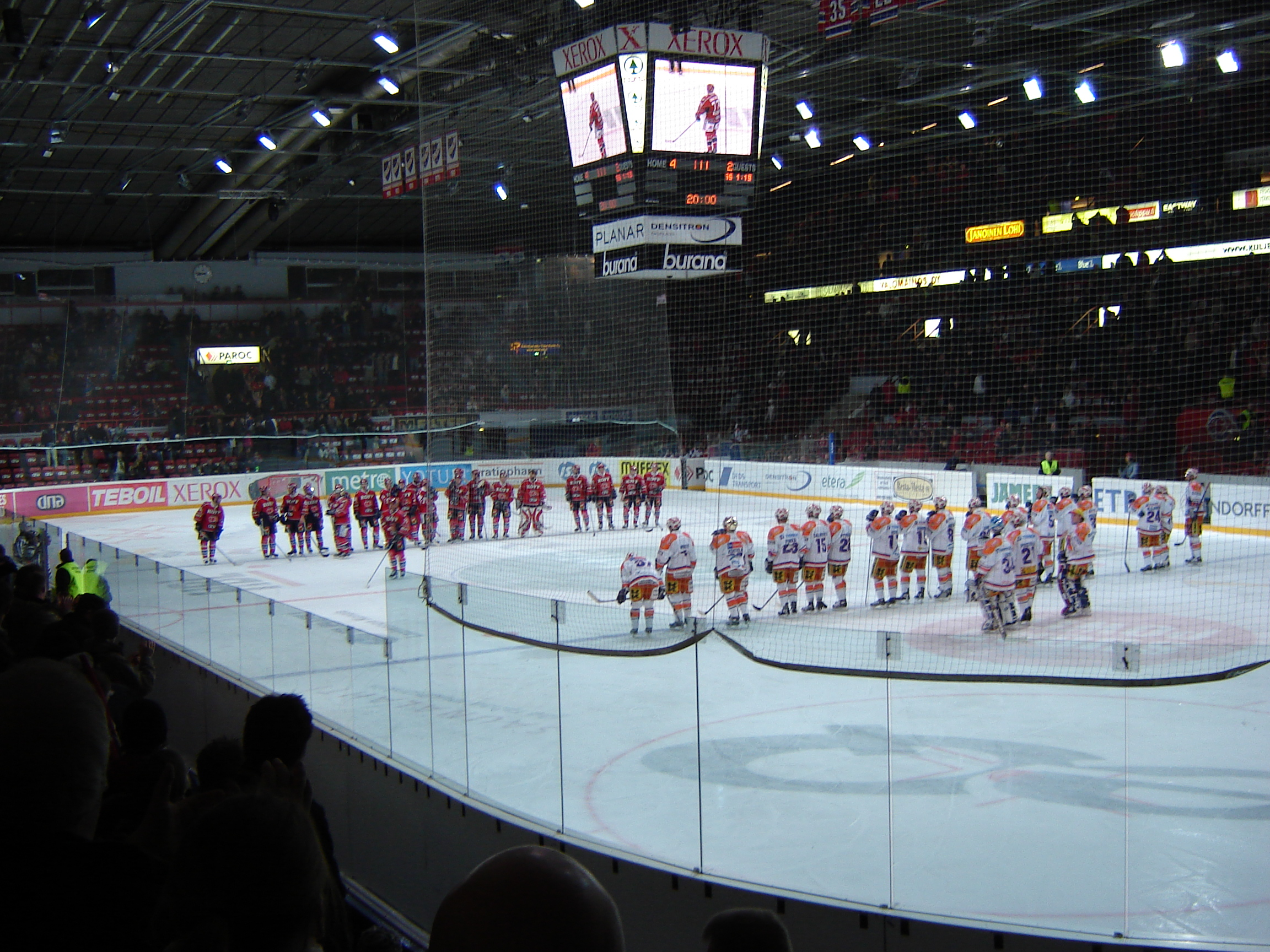
HIFK (red) and Tappara (white) line up on the ice after a game at Helsinki Ice Hall during the 2005–06 SM-liiga season.

Helsinki Ice Hall has been the home of HIFK of the Liiga since its construction in 1966. The arena has also served as the home of Jokerit, first from 1967 until the team moved to Veikkaus Arena (previously Hartwall Arena) in 1997, and again for some of their home games beginning in 2023. Jokerit played their final home game at the Helsinki Ice Hall on 17 February 2026, as Jokerit are scheduled play all of their 2026 playoff home games at Veikkaus Arena, and will move there permanently for the following season.

Helsinki Ice Hall used to be the main venue for the majority of important ice sports events and indoor arena concerts held in Finland but, after the constructions of Gatorade Center in 1990, Veikkaus Arena in 1997, and Nokia Arena in 2021, many of the largest events now take place in the newer arenas. Nevertheless, the arena remains an active venue for concerts, conferences, expos and sports events.

The arena hosted some games of the 2016 World Junior Ice Hockey Championships.

The Group A games of the 2022 IIHF World Championship were moved from Helsinki Halli to Helsinki Ice Hall, due to some of the owners of Helsinki Halli being covered by International Ice Hockey Federation (IIHF) sanctions established following the 2022 Russian invasion of Ukraine.

== Names and nicknames ==
Helsinki Ice Hall is nicknamed Nordis in reference to its address on Nordenskiöldinkatu. Another nickname for the arena is Petoluola, Finnish for 'The Beast Cave,' which refers to its role as HIFK's home arena – the secondary logo of HIFK is a red panther. The Finnish Ice Hockey Association occasionally uses Töölö, the neighborhood in which the venue is located, as a shorthand to refer to the arena itself.

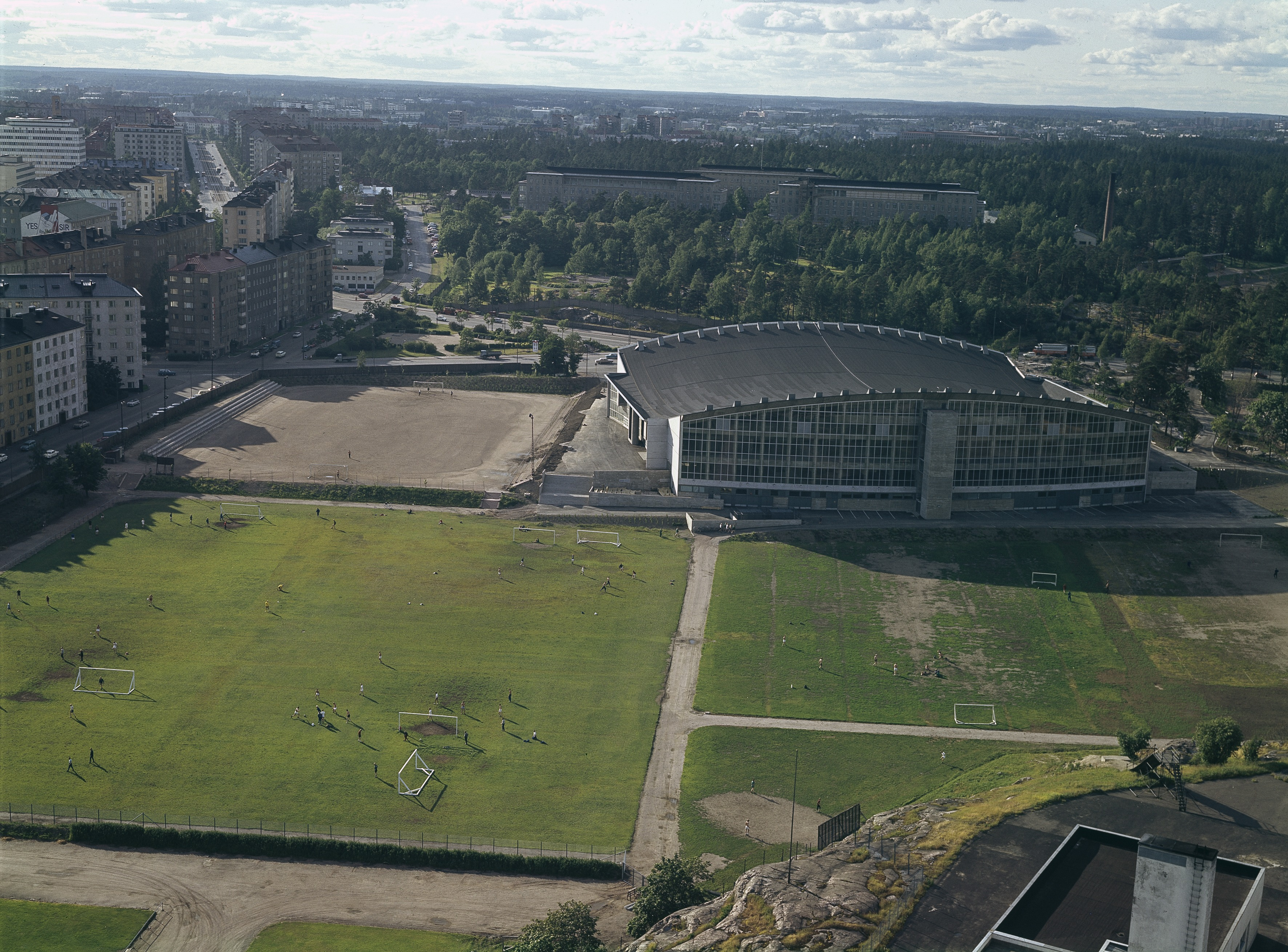
Helsinki Ice Hall in 1968

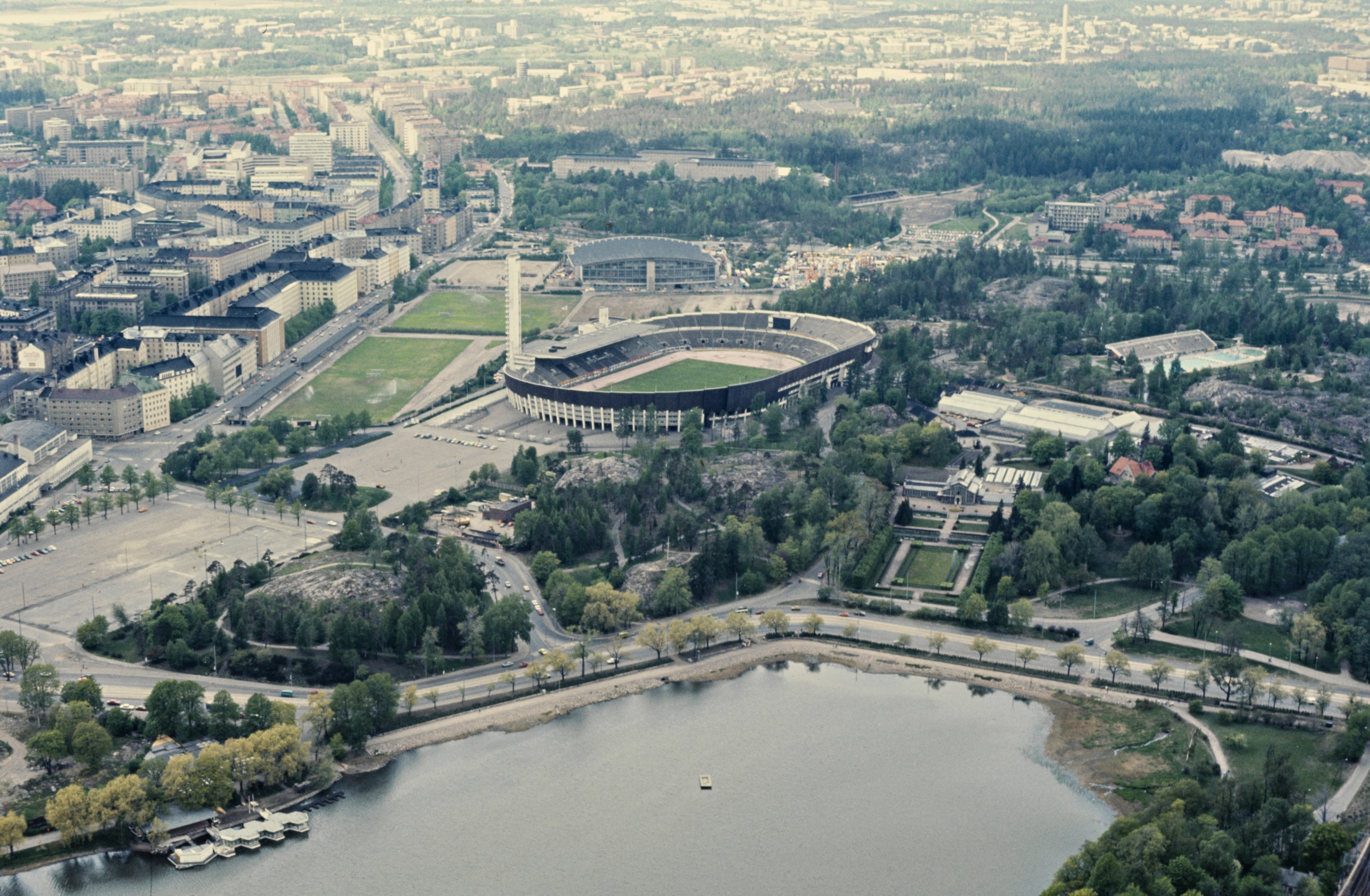
Helsinki Olympic Stadium and Helsinki Ice Hall in 1976

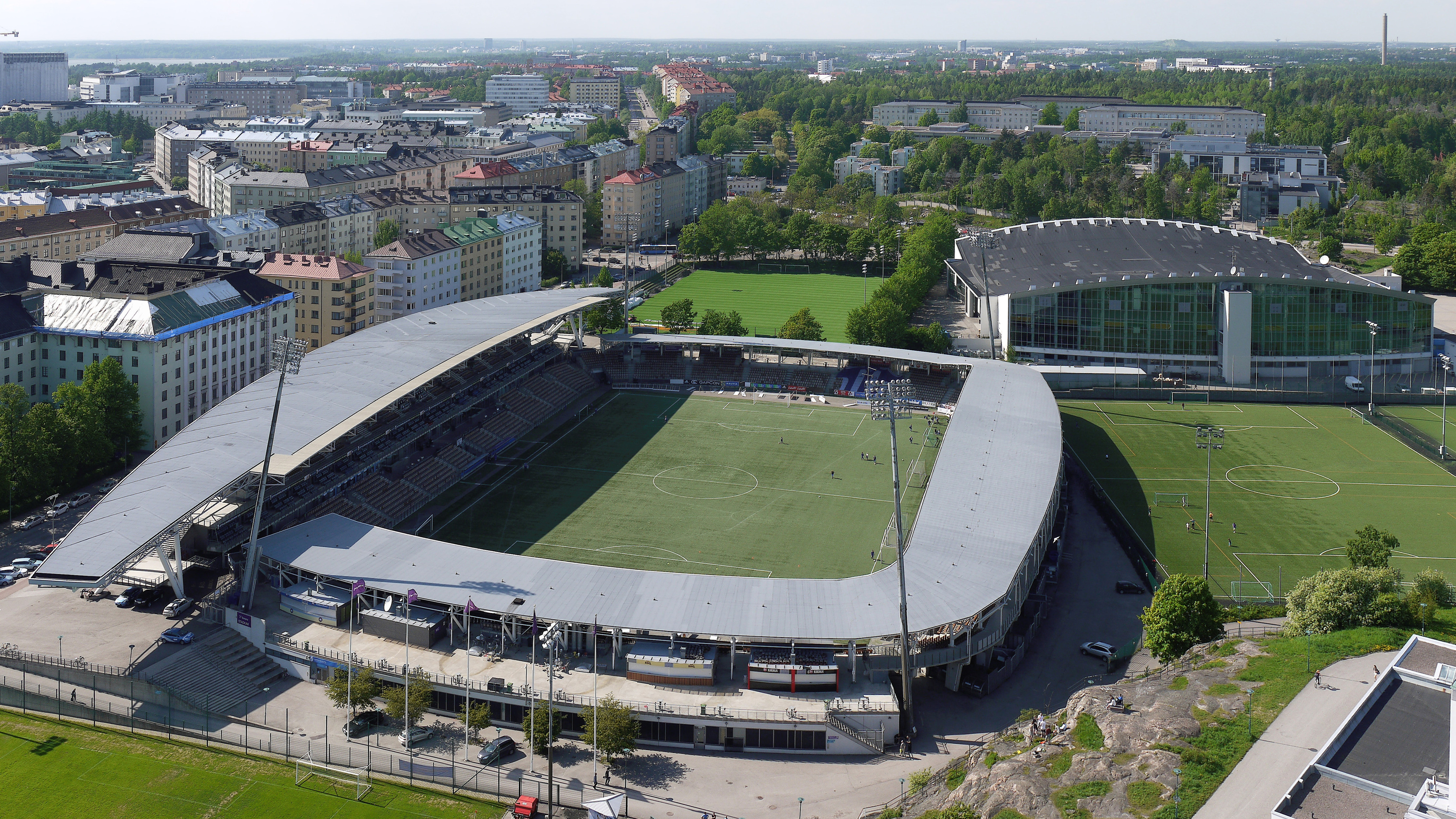
Sonera Stadium and Helsinki Ice Hall in 2013

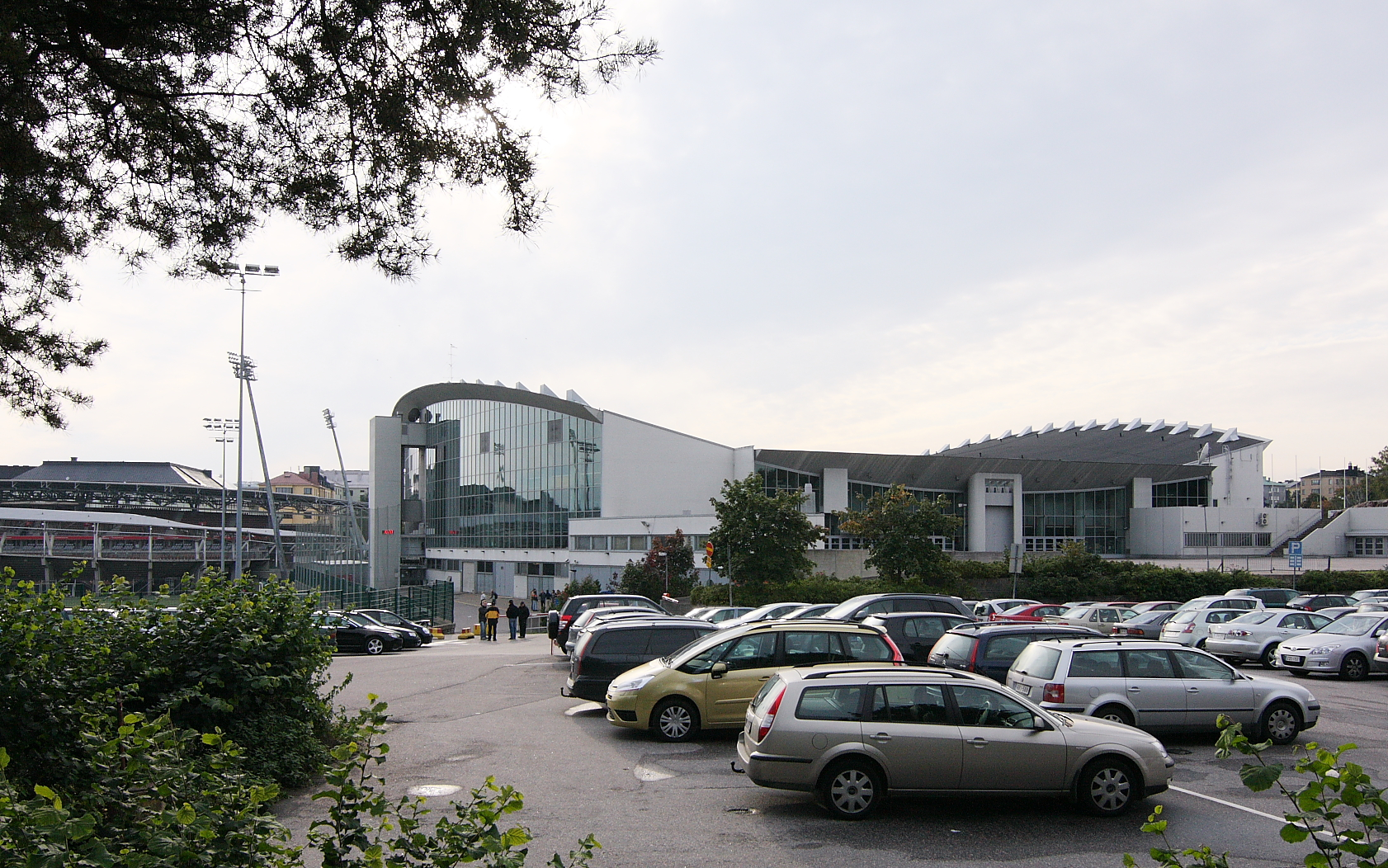
Helsinki Ice Hall parking lot

== Events ==
- Tina Turner (1985, 1990)
- Bob Dylan (1987, 1989)
- Frank Zappa (1988)
- Heaven and Hell (2007, 2009)
- Avril Lavigne (2005, 2008)
- Van Halen (1998)
- Mötley Crüe (1989, 2007)
- Iron Maiden (1983, 1984, 1986, 1988, 1990, 1992)
- Avenged Sevenfold (2010)
- Judas Priest (1986, 1991, 2008, 2012, 2015, 2022)
- Megadeth (2008, 2011)
- Metallica (1988, 1992, 1996)
- Scorpions (1989, 1991, 2004)
- Deep Purple (1993, 2009)
- Dream Theater (2005, 2007, 2009, 2012, 2014)
- Opeth (2009, 2011)
- Pain of Salvation (2011)
- Frank Sinatra (1989)
- Whitesnake (2011, 2022)
- Sex Pistols (2008)
- Snoop Dogg (2008)
- The Prodigy (2009)
- Kelly Clarkson (2008)
- Yes (2004)
- Paramore (2009)
- 50 Cent (2010)
- Bullet for My Valentine (2010)
- Taste of Chaos 2009 (Performers: Maylene and the Sons of Disaster, Every Time I Die, Killswitch Engage and In Flames)
- Disturbed (2008)
- Tokio Hotel (2010)
- Thirty Seconds to Mars (2008)
- ZZ Top
- Muse (2007)
- Motörhead (1981, 1999, 2007, 2008, 2009)
- Kiss (1983, 1988, 2022)
- Dire Straits (1985)
- The Who (1967)
- Rammstein (2001)
- Stevie Wonder (1984)
- The Beach Boys (2006)
- Slayer (2006, 2018)
- The Knockouts and Brian Setzer on the Brian Setzer Rockabilly Riot tour (2011)
- Guns N' Roses (1991)
- Erasure (1992)
- Finale of Idols (2007, 2008)
- Finale of X Factor (2010)
- Jeff Dunham (2009)
- WWE, House show (WrestleMania Revenge Tour/Raw in 2009 and SmackDown in 2019)
- Mr. Olympia (1992)
- Santana
- Tori Amos (2011)
- AC/DC (1986, 1988, 1991, 1996)
- Iron Maiden (1983, 1984, 1986, 1988, 1990, 1992, 1993, 1998, 1999)
- Bon Jovi (1986, 1988, 1989, 1993)
- Sunrise Avenue (2015, 2016)
- Twenty One Pilots (2016, 2019)
- Bring Me the Horizon (2016)
- The 1975 (2017)
- Slipknot (2004, 2008, 2015)
- Marilyn Manson (2001, 2007, 2017)
- Halsey (2020)
- Hanoi Rocks (2022)
- Dreamcatcher (group) (2023)
- Lorna Shore (2023, 2026)
- Marcus & Martinus (2024)
- P1Harmony (2025)
- Taemin (2025)
- Ice Cage (2025)
- KAJ (2025)

== See also ==
- List of indoor arenas in Finland
- List of indoor arenas in Nordic countries

Preceded by No arena, outdoor ice	HIFK; Home arena 1966–present	Succeeded by Current
Preceded by Inaugural arena	Jokerit; Home arena 1967–1997	Succeeded by Helsinki Halli
Preceded by Helsinki Halli	Jokerit; Home arena 2023-present	Succeeded by Current
Preceded by Palace of Sports of the Central Lenin Stadium; Moscow	EuroBasket; Final venue 1967	Succeeded by PalaFuorigrotta; Naples
