= John Hiatt discography =

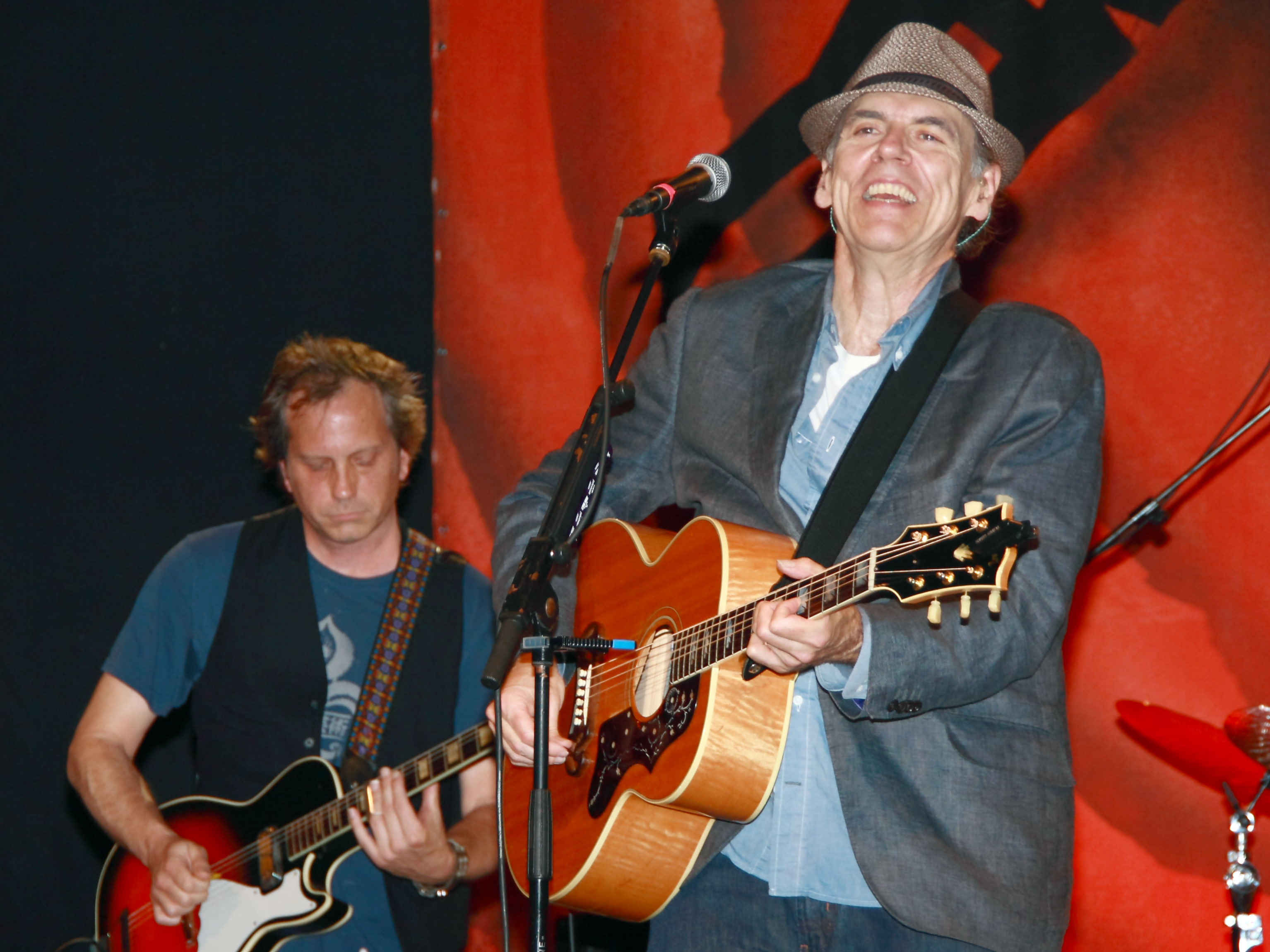
Hiatt in 2012

The John Hiatt discography covers material that he recorded from 1974 to the present day. He has recorded 24 studio albums, and two live albums.

== Albums ==
Year	Album	Peak chart positions											Label
Year	Album	US	US Indie	AUS	CAN	BEL	GER	NL	NZ	SWE	SWI	UK	Label
1974	Hangin' Around the Observatory	—	—	—	—	—	—	—	—	—	—	—	Epic
1975	Overcoats	—	—	—	—	—	—	—	—	—	—	—	Epic
1979	Slug Line	202	—	—	—	—	—	—	—	—	—	—	MCA
1980	Two Bit Monsters	—	—	—	—	—	—	—	—	41	—	—	MCA
1982	All of a Sudden	203	—	—	—	—	—	—	—	45	—	—	Geffen
1983	Riding with the King	—	—	—	—	—	—	—	—	36	—	—	Geffen
1985	Warming Up to the Ice Age	210	—	—	—	—	—	48	—	12	—	—	Geffen
1987	Bring the Family	107	—	74	85	—	—	35	21	14	—	—	A&M
1988	Slow Turning	98	—	71	29	—	—	39	31	13	—	—	A&M
1990	Stolen Moments	61	—	92	44	—	68	17	25	23	25	72	A&M
1993	Perfectly Good Guitar	47	—	83	34	—	89	13	19	11	11	67	A&M
1994	Hiatt Comes Alive at Budokan?	—	—	—	—	—	—	—	—	—	—	—	A&M
1995	Walk On	48	—	—	38	10	49	31	—	13	49	74	Capitol
1997	Little Head	111	—	—	—	38	—	27	—	34	—	111	Capitol
2000	Crossing Muddy Waters	110	18	—	—	34	—	51	—	—	—	—	Vanguard
2001	The Tiki Bar is Open	89	4	—	—	47	86	—	—	37	84	135	Vanguard
2003	Beneath This Gruff Exterior	73	3	—	—	—	93	96	—	—	—	—	New West
2005	Master of Disaster	126	10	—	—	—	—	78	—	51	—	—	New West
2005	Live from Austin, TX	—	—	—	—	—	—	—	—	—	—	—	New West
2008	Same Old Man	84	5	—	—	—	—	72	—	35	—	—	New West
2010	The Open Road	72	8	—	—	—	—	62	—	29	—	200	New West
2011	Dirty Jeans and Mudslide Hymns	59	7	—	—	95	61	20	—	17	—	99	New West
2012	Mystic Pinball	39	8	—	—	120	—	41	—	35	—	139	New West
2014	Terms of My Surrender	47	6	—	—	—	86	—	—	27	41	—	New West
2018	The Eclipse Sessions	162	6	—	—	163	74	59	—	—	43	—	New West
2021	Leftover Feelings (with the Jerry Douglas Band)	—	—	—	—	25	28	10	—	—	—	—	New West
"—" denotes releases that did not chart													New West

== Singles ==
As a performer, Hiatt has never made the US Hot 100, or the "bubbling under" charts. He has charted on other, specialized US charts, and has charted on the hit parade in Canada, Netherlands and New Zealand.

Year	Single	Peak chart positions								Album
Year	Single	US Main	US Alt	AUS	CAN	CAN AC	NL	NZ	UK	Album
1982	"I Look for Love"	—	—	—	—	—	—	—	—	All of a Sudden
1985	"Zero House"	—	—	—	—	—	—	—	—	Warming Up to the Ice Age
1985	"Living a Little, Laughing a Little"	—	—	—	—	—	—	—	—	Warming Up to the Ice Age
1987	"Thank You Girl"	27	—	—	—	—	—	—	—	Bring the Family
1987	"Have a Little Faith in Me"	—	—	63	—	—	14	—	—	Bring the Family
1988	"Slow Turning"	8	22	71	70	—	—	42	—	Slow Turning
1988	"Paper Thin"	18	—	—	—	—	—	—	—	Slow Turning
1988	"Georgia Rae"	—	—	—	—	—	51	—	—	Slow Turning
1988	"Tennessee Plates"	—	—	—	—	—	—	—	—	Slow Turning
1989	"Drive South"	—	—	—	—	—	—	—	—	Slow Turning
1990	"Child of the Wild Blue Yonder"	17	24	133	48	—	—	—	—	Stolen Moments
1990	"The Rest of the Dream"	—	—	—	—	—	—	—	—	Stolen Moments
1990	"Real Fine Love"	—	—	—	—	—	—	—	—	Stolen Moments
1990	"Bring Back Your Love to Me"	—	—	—	—	—	67	—	—	Stolen Moments
1993	"Perfectly Good Guitar"	16	—	—	76	—	—	—	—	Perfectly Good Guitar
1993	"Buffalo River Home"	—	—	—	—	—	—	—	—	Perfectly Good Guitar
1993	"Angel"	—	—	—	—	—	—	—	—	Perfectly Good Guitar
1993	"Something Wild"	31	—	—	—	—	—	—	—	Perfectly Good Guitar
1993	"Cross My Fingers"	—	—	—	—	—	—	—	—	Perfectly Good Guitar
1994	"Have A Little Faith in Me" (Live version)	—	—	—	—	—	—	—	—	Hiatt Comes Alive at Budokan?
1995	"Cry Love"	—	—	—	46	14	—	—	136	Walk On
1995	"Your Love is My Rest"	—	—	—	—	—	—	—	—	Walk On
1996	"Shredding the Document"	—	—	—	—	—	—	—	—	Walk On
1997	"Pirate Radio"	—	—	—	—	—	—	—	—	Little Head
1997	"Sure Pinocchio"	—	—	—	—	—	—	—	—	Little Head
1998	"Have a Little Faith in Me" (New version)	—	—	—	—	—	—	—	—	The Best of John Hiatt
2000	"Let it Slip Away"	—	—	—	—	—	—	—	—	Where the Heart Is (Soundtrack)
2000	"Before I Go"	—	—	—	—	—	—	—	—	Crossing Muddy Waters
2000	"Lift Up Every Stone"	—	—	—	—	—	—	—	—	Crossing Muddy Waters
2001	"My Old Friend"	—	—	—	—	—	—	—	—	The Tiki Bar is Open
2001	"I'll Never Get Over You"	—	—	—	—	—	—	—	—	The Tiki Bar is Open

=== Guest singles ===
Year	Single	Artist	Chart positions		Album
Year	Single	Artist	US Country	CAN Country	Album
1990	"One Step Over the Line"	Nitty Gritty Dirt Band (with Rosanne Cash)	63	47	Will the Circle Be Unbroken: Volume Two

=== Music videos ===
Year	Video
1983	"She Loves The Jerk"
1985	"Living A Little, Laughing A Little"
1987	"Thank You Girl"
1987	"Have a Little Faith in Me"
1988	"Slow Turning"
1990	"Child of the Wild Blue Yonder"
1994	"Buffalo River Home"
1995	"Cry Love"
2018	"Over The Hill"

== Album appearances ==
- "Spy Boy", on the soundtrack to the movie Cruising, 1980
- "Too Late" and "Skin Game" on the soundtrack to the movie The Border, 1982 (also featuring a cover of "Across the Borderline" by Freddy Fender)
- "Take Time to Know Her", on the compilation sampler Attack of the Killer B's Volume One, 1983
- "Snake Charmer", on the soundtrack to the movie White Nights, 1985
- "I'm a Real Man", on the soundtrack to the movie Youngblood, 1986
- "Horse & Crow" duet with Peter Case, on album Peter Case, 1986
- "Thank Someone", duet with Amy Grant, on the children's album Free to be... a Family, by Marlo Thomas and Friends, 1988
- Guitar on "Love Gets Strange", on the Nick Lowe LP Pinker and Prouder Than Previous, Columbia Records/Demon Music Group, 1988
- "One Step Over the Line", duet with Rosanne Cash, on Will the Circle Be Unbroken: Volume Two, by the Nitty Gritty Dirt Band, 1989
- "My Girl" and "At the End of a Long Lonely Day", both duets with Loudon Wainwright III, on the compilation album From Hell to Obscurity, 1989
- Backing vocalist and whistle solo on "Too Sensitive for This World", on the Ben Vaughn LP Dressed In Black, Enigma Records, 1990
- "Up Against The Sky", on the soundtrack to the movie Shout, 1991
- "Across The Borderline", guest vocals on the album Partners, by Flaco Jiménez, 1992
- "A Mess Of Blues", on the tribute album Till the Night is Gone: A Tribute to Doc Pomus, 1995
- "Johnny 99", on the tribute album One Step Up/Two Steps Back: The Songs of Bruce Springsteen, 1997
- "Bound By Love", guest vocals on the album Jubilation, by The Band, 1998
- "Thirty Years Of Tears", guest vocals on the album Love That Strong, by ElizaBeth Hill, 1999
- "The Same Thing", on the tribute album A Tribute to Muddy Waters King of the Blues, 1999
- "I’m Satisfied", on the tribute album Avalon Blues: A Tribute to the Music of Mississippi John Hurt, 2001
- The Country Bears Official Soundtrack, Disney, 2002
- "Everybody Went Low", from the compilation album, WYEP Live and Direct: Volume 4 - On Air Performances, 2002
- "Down the Old Plank Road", guest vocals on the album Down the Old Plank Road: The Nashville Sessions, by The Chieftains, 2002
- "Jordan is a Hard Road to Travel", guest vocals on the album Further Down the Old Plank Road, by The Chieftains, 2003
- "The Ballad of Curtis Loew", performed with moe. on the tribute album Under the Influence: A Jam Band Tribute to Lynyrd Skynyrd, 2004
- "I’m Not That Kat (Anymore)", guest vocals on the album Heard it on the X, by Los Super Seven, 2005
- "Instant Karma" (the John Lennon song) on the soundtrack to the television show, "My Name Is Earl - The Album Karma Is Funny Thing (Original Soundtrack)", 2006
- "Ain’t no More Cane (On the Brazos)", on the tribute album Endless Highway: The Music of The Band, 2007
- "Welfare Music", on the album The Imus Ranch Record, 2008
- "Just to Satisfy You", on the tribute album The Music Inside: A Collaboration Dedicated to Waylon Jennings Volume 1, 2011
- "Tennessee Plates", guest vocals on the album Dust Bowl by Joe Bonamassa, J&R Adventures, 2011
- "Ride On Out a Ways", on the album Use Me by David Bromberg, Appleseed Recordings, 2011

== Other releases ==
- Y'all Caught? The Ones That Got Away 1979–1985 (compilation), Geffen Records, 1989
- Little Village (with Ry Cooder, Nick Lowe & Jim Keltner), Reprise Records, 1992
- Slug Line/Two Bit Monsters, BGO Records, 1993
- Live at the Hiatt (promo CD recorded at the London Forum), A&M Records, 1994
- Greatest Hits: The A&M Years '87 - '94, A&M Records, 1998
- The Best of John Hiatt, Capitol Records, 1998
- Anthology (2 CD compilation of Hiatt's material from 1974 to 2000 includes "Spy Boy" from the "Cruisin'" soundtrack) Hip-O, 2001
- The Best of John Hiatt: The Millennium Collection, A&M Records, 2003
- Hangin' Around the Observatory/Overcoats, BGO Records, 2006
- Collected, Universal, 2012
- Here to Stay: Best of 2000-2012, New West Records, 2013

There are also several albums of his songs performed by other artists, specifically:

- Love Gets Strange: The Songs of John Hiatt, various artists, 1993
- Dear John, Ilse DeLange, 1999
- Rollin' into Memphis: Songs of John Hiatt, various artists, 2000
- It'll Come to You: The Songs of John Hiatt, various artists, 2003
