= Y'all Caught? The Ones That Got Away 1979–1985 =

Compilation album by John Hiatt
- Released: September 1989
- Genre: Rock
- Length: 47:13
- Label: Geffen

John Hiatt chronology
Slow Turning (1989)	Y'all Caught? The Ones That Got Away 1979–1985 (1989)	Stolen Moments (1990)

Professional ratings
Review scores
Source	Rating
Allmusic	3/5 stars
Robert Christgau	B+

Y'all Caught? The Ones That Got Away 1979–1985 was singer-songwriter John Hiatt's first greatest hits album, released in 1989. It features music from the albums Slug Line, Two Bit Monsters, All of a Sudden, Riding with the King, and Warming Up to the Ice Age.

== Critical reception ==
Mike DeGagne of AllMusic writes, "As far as compilations go, Y'all Caught is a friendly romp through Hiatt's early days and is good to have in the collection."

Robert Christgau grades the album a B+ and says, "his greatest misses are catchy, clever, even compassionate when you listen hard."

== Track listing ==
All tracks are written by John Hiatt

No.	Title	Original album	Length
1.	"The Crush"	Warming Up to the Ice Age (1985)	4:05
2.	"She Said the Same Things to Me"	Warming Up to the Ice Age	3:55
3.	"Love Like Blood"	Riding with the King (1983)	3:46
4.	"Slug Line"	Slug Line (1979)	2:57
5.	"She Loves the Jerk"	Riding with the King	3:34
6.	"My Edge of the Razor"	All of a Sudden (1982)	4:19
7.	"Pink Bedroom"	Two Bit Monsters (1980)	2:52
8.	"It Hasn't Happened Yet"	Two Bit Monsters	3:19
9.	"Radio Girl"	Slug Line	2:53
10.	"I Look for Love"	All of a Sudden	3:28
11.	"Washable Ink"	Slug Line	3:12
12.	"Riding with the King"	Riding with the King	4:16
13.	"When We Ran"	Warming Up to the Ice Age	4:37
Total length:			47:13

== Personnel ==
1 – "The Crush"

- John Hiatt – Guitar, Vocals
- Willie Greene, Jr. – Bass, Vocals
- Jesse Boyce – Bass, Rhythm Guitar
- Larrie Londin – Drums
- Randy McCormick – Keyboards
- Kim Hutchcroft – Saxophone
- Larry Williams – Saxophone
- Bill Reichenbach – Trombone
- Chuck Findley – Trombone
- Gary Grant – Trumpet
- Jerry Hey – Trumpet
- Bobby King – Additional Vocals
- Producer, engineer, Mixed By – Norbert Putnam
- Assistant Engineer, Mixed By (Assistant) – J.T. Cantwell

2 – "She Said The Same Things To Me"

- John Hiatt – Guitar, Vocals
- Jesse Boyce – Bass
- Willie Greene, Jr. – Bass Vocals
- Larrie Londin – Drums
- Mack Gayden – Rhythm Guitar
- Frieda Woody – Additional Vocals
- Randy McCormick – Keyboards
- Producer, Mixed By – Norbert Putnam
- Mixed By – Scott Hendricks
- Mixed By (Assistant) – J.T. Cantwell

3 – "Love Like Blood"

- John Hiatt – Guitar
- Martin Belmont – Guitar
- Nick Lowe – Bass, Background Vocals
- Bobby Irwin – Drums
- Paul Carrack – Keyboards, Background Vocals
- Producer – Nick Lowe
- Engineer – Neil King
- Assistant Engineer – Irene Kelly

4 – "Slug Line"

- John Hiatt – Guitar, Vocals
- Jon Paris – Bass
- B.J. Wilson – Drums
- Doug Yankus – Guitar
- Producer – Denny Bruce
- Engineer – Russ Gary
- Second Engineer – Michael Carnevale

5 – "She Loves The Jerk"

- John Hiatt – Guitar, Vocals
- Scott Matthews – Drums, Bass, Keyboards, Saxophone, Slide Guitar, Background Vocals
- Producer, Mixed By – Ron Nagle
- Producer, Mixed By – Scott Matthews
- Mixed By (Assistant) – Maureen Droney

6 – "My Edge Of The Razor"

- John Hiatt – Guitar, Vocals
- James Rolleston – Bass, Background Vocals
- Darrell Verdusco – Drums, Background Vocals
- Jesse Harms – Keyboards, Background Vocals
- Producer – Tony Visconti
- Engineer – Larry Alexander
- Assistant Engineer – Jason Corsaro
- Assistant Engineer – Josh Abbey

7 – "Pink Bedroom"

- John Hiatt – Guitar, Vocals
- Howard Epstein – Bass, Background Vocals
- Darrell Verdusco – Drums, Background Vocals
- Shane Keister – Keyboards
- Producer – Denny Bruce
- Producer – John Hiatt
- Recorded By, Mixed By – Mark Howlett

8 – "It Hasn't Happened Yet"

- John Hiatt – Guitar, Vocals
- Howard Epstein – Bass, Background Vocals
- Darrell Verdusco – Drums, Background Vocals
- Shane Keister – Keyboards
- Producer – Denny Bruce
- Producer – John Hiatt
- Recorded By, Mixed By – Mark Howlett

9 – "Radio Girl"

- John Hiatt – Guitar, Vocals
- Jon Paris – Bass
- Thom Mooney – Drums
- Doug Yankus – Guitar
- Producer – Denny Bruce
- Engineer – Russ Gary
- Second Engineer – Michael Carnevale

10 – "I Look For Love"

- John Hiatt – Guitar, Vocals
- James Rolleston – Bass, Background Vocals
- Darrell Verdusco – Drums, Background Vocals
- Jesse Harms – Keyboards, Background Vocals
- Producer – Tony Visconti
- Engineer – Larry Alexander
- Assistant Engineer – Jason Corsaro
- Assistant Engineer – Josh Abbey

11 – "Washable Ink"

- John Hiatt – Guitar, Vocals
- Veyler Hildebrand – Bass
- Thom Mooney – Drums
- Doug Yankus – Guitar
- Etan McElroy – Piano, Background Vocals
- Producer – Denny Bruce
- Engineer – Russ Gary
- Second Engineer – Michael Carnevale

12 – "Riding With the King"

- John Hiatt – Guitar
- Nick Lowe – Bass, Background Vocals
- Bobby Irwin – Drums
- Martin Belmont – Guitar
- Paul Carrack – Keyboards, Background Vocals
- Producer – Nick Lowe
- Engineer – Neil King
- Assistant Engineer – Irene Kelly

13 – "When We Ran"

- John Hiatt – Guitar, Vocals
- Jesse Boyce – Bass
- Larrie Londin – Drums
- Randy McCormick – Keyboards
- Producer, engineer, Mixed By – Norbert Putnam
- Assistant Engineer – J.T. Cantwell

Track information and credits adapted from the album's liner notes.
