= Tim Devine =

- Education: University of California, Berkeley
- Occupations: Music executive Entrepreneur
- Years active: 1974 - present
- Board member of: Scayl, Inc.

Tim Devine is an American music executive and entrepreneur. The founder of Webcastr, Devine is best known for his work as an a&r executive.

== Early life and education ==
Devine spent his childhood in Chicago, Kansas City, New York and New Jersey and moved to Los Angeles when he was 12. At 8, he saw the Beatles on the Ed Sullivan Show, and decided to pursue a career in the music business. In junior and senior high, he wrote about music for his school papers and worked at Licorice Pizza, a retail music chain. He continued as a music journalist through college, and freelanced for Phonograph Record, Rolling Stone, and the LA Free Press, among others.

After a year at UCLA and a year at California State University, Northridge, Devine left Los Angeles to attend the University of California, Berkeley. At Berkeley, he was involved with the school's concert committee and served as the music director at KALX, the university's radio station, and as a fan, he attended historic concerts which included the final shows by the Sex Pistols and The Band's The Last Waltz. As a sophomore, he was hired by A&M Records as a college promotion representative, a position he held until 1978, when he graduated from Berkeley with a BA in Mass Communications/Political Science.

== Career ==
Just prior to his graduation, Devine—who by then had a diverse background in the music business—was hired by Warner Communications for a management training program, and began working at Warner Bros. Records in Burbank, California. As part of the program, he spent a month in each of 12 departments within the company, including the A&R, promotion, marketing departments, and worked with music industry veterans Mo Ostin, Lenny Waronker, Russ Titelman, Jerry Wexler, Bob Krasnow, Ed Rosenblatt, and Russ Thyret. Following the management trainee program, Devine was hired as a product manager for the label. In that capacity he was responsible for releases by Prince, Devo, Gang of Four, Van Morrison, Bob Marley, Pat Metheny, Laurie Anderson, Steve Winwood, and Little Feat, among others, and served as the product manager for U2's first two American releases, Boy and October. After six years at the company, Devine left Warner Bros. to briefly become a manager. His artist roster included Dream Syndicate, Gang of Four, Thin Lizzy and Ultravox.

In 1984, Devine was appointed head of artist development for MCA Records, where he was involved with records by Tom Petty and the Heartbreakers, The Who, Oingo Boingo, Charlie Sexton, the Pogues, among others.

In 1987, Devine moved into an A&R position at Capitol Records. In a 2010 interview, he said: "I didn't want to jump into A&R until I really knew the full spectrum of marketing. My fundamental belief is that you can sign a great band and make a great record, but if nobody hears it, what's the point? I was ready to make the move because I wanted to get closer to the source of the artistic nucleus."

Devine had significant success during his 8-year tenure at Capitol, where he signed Mazzy Star, Concrete Blonde, John Hiatt, and Lloyd Cole, among others, and a&r'd records by Paul McCartney, Beastie Boys, The Beach Boys, and Heart. He was widely recognized for his work with Bonnie Raitt, whom he signed in 1988. Made over the course of a year, her Capitol debut, Nick of Time, sold in excess of five million albums and won three Grammy Awards, including Album of the Year. Devine was also acknowledged for signing Blind Melon and a&r'ing their self-titled debut. Released in September 1992, the single "No Rain" was an international hit, and Blind Melon sold more than four million albums. Additionally, Devine produced numerous film and television soundtrack recordings for the label, including the soundtracks for Rainman, Clueless, Bull Durham, Moonstruck, and Imagine: John Lennon.

Devine was named senior vice president of A&R for Columbia Records in 1996; in 2002, as his role expanded, he was appointed General Manager of the label's West Coast division. He served in an A&R capacity on records by Aerosmith, The Offspring, Leonard Cohen, Ric Ocasek, Soul Asylum and Pete Yorn, and signed artists including OneRepublic (via Velvet Hammer), Switchfoot, Sinéad O'Connor, Brandi Carlile, Cake and the Afghan Whigs. Additionally, Devine signed Train, who sold more than two million albums and won two Grammy Awards with their first Columbia release, Drops of Jupiter. Devine orchestrated the label deals for Aware Records (John Mayer, Five for Fighting) and Rick Rubin's American Recordings, whose roster then included System of a Down, Johnny Cash, and Black Crowes. He co-produced Columbia film soundtracks including the soundtracks for Orange County and I Know What You Did Last Summer and executive produced the soundtrack for the PBS series, Sessions at West 54th: Recorded Live in New York, which featured Sheryl Crow, Lou Reed, David Byrne and others.

Devine also signed Katy Perry, who he met through Glen Ballard in 2003. Ballard's label, Java, which would have released Perry's album, had been dropped by Island Def Jam, and Columbia bought the masters for Katy's unreleased Java record. The label planned to release the record with the addition of two songs, but after Devine brought in co-writers including Desmond Child, Greg Wells, Butch Walker, Scott Cutler/Anne Previn, The Matrix, Kara DioGuardi, Dr. Luke and Max Martin, the entire Java record was scrapped. Subsequently, Chairman Don Ienner and COO Michelle Anthony resigned from Sony Music, and Perry was among several artists who were dropped. Perry then signed with Capitol. Six of the songs written and recorded during the Columbia sessions ended up on Perry's One of the Boys. The only Columbia track released from Perry was "Simple," which Devine had pitched for the soundtrack for the film The Sisterhood of the Travelling Pants.

In 2006, as Devine became increasingly interested in technology and digital media, he founded Webcastr.com, a 24-hour online digital multi-channel network that featured daily content from more than 200 channel providers including CBS News, the BBC, MTV News, Fox Sports, the Wall Street Journal, CBC, AFP (France), the New York Times, Newsweek, Warner Music Group, Sony/BMG Music, an others. Webcastr's viewership exceeded one million viewers per month in more than 175 countries.

In 2014, Devine joined Scayl, an end-to-end encryption email service. He is the senior vice president of business development and serves on the company's board of directors.

In 2022, Devine was named Head of A&R by Sunset Blvd Records, an independent record label based in Los Angeles, where he signed Everclear, Fastball, The Dandy Warhols and Butthole Surfers.

Devine has been a featured speaker at Digital Hollywood, SXSW, and the New Music Seminar, and is a founding member of Organizing for America. He is featured in the 2015 documentary The Damned: Don’t You Wish That We Were Dead.

== Selected discography ==
Year	Album	Artist	Credit
1988	Imagine: John Lennon	Various artists	A&R
1988	The Decline of Western Civilization Part 2: The Metal Years soundtrack	Various artists	Soundtrack executive producer
1988	Bull Durham soundtrack	Various artists	Soundtrack co-producer
1988	Tequila Sunrise soundtrack	Various artists	Soundtrack co-producer
1988	Rain Man soundtrack	Various artists	A&R
1989	Nick of Time	Bonnie Raitt	A&R
1990	Tripping the Live Fantastic	Paul McCartney	A&R
1990	Lloyd Cole	Lloyd Cole	A&R
1991	Luck of the Draw	Bonnie Raitt	A&R
1992	Blind Melon	Blind Melon	A&R
1992	Check Your Head	Beastie Boys	A&R
1993	So Tonight That I Might See	Mazzy Star	A&R
1993	Off the Ground	Paul McCartney	A&R
1994	Ill Communication	Beastie Boys	A&R
1994	Longing in Their Hearts	Bonnie Raitt	A&R
1995	Walk On	John Hiatt	A&R
1995	Clueless soundtrack	Various artists	Soundtrack co-producer
1996	Electriclarryland	Butthole Surfers	A&R
1997	Gospel Oak	Sinéad O'Connor	A&R
1997	I Know What You Did Last Summer soundtrack	Various artists	Soundtrack co-producer
1998	Train	Train	A&R
1998	1965	Afghan Whigs	A&R
1999	The Gift of Game	Crazy Town	A&R
1999	Black Elvis/Lost in Space	Kool Keith	A&R
2001	Drops of Jupiter	Train	A&R
2001	musicforthemorningafter	Pete Yorn	A&R
2001	Comfort Eagle	Cake	A&R
2001	Orange County soundtrack	Various artists	Soundtrack co-producer
2001	Sessions at West 54th	Various artists	Executive producer
2003	My Private Nation	Train	A&R
2003	So Long, Astoria	The Ataris	A&R
2003	The Beautiful Letdown	Switchfoot	A&R
2005	Brandi Carlile	Brandi Carlile	A&R
2005	Greatest Hits	The Offspring	A&R
2008	One of the Boys	Katy Perry	
