= The Eclipse Sessions =

Studio album by John Hiatt
- Released: October 12, 2018
- Recorded: August 18–October 8, 2017
- Studios: The Rock House, Franklin, Tennessee
- Genres: Roots rock; Americana; blues rock; folk rock
- Length: 42:13
- Label: New West
- Producer: Kevin McKendree

John Hiatt chronology
Terms of My Surrender (2014)	The Eclipse Sessions (2018)	Leftover Feelings (2021)

Singles from The Eclipse Sessions
- 1. "Cry To Me" Released: August 10, 2018; 2. "Over the Hill" Released: September 7, 2018; 3. "Poor Imitation of God" Released: September 28, 2018

The Eclipse Sessions is singer-songwriter John Hiatt's twenty-third album, released in 2018. It is his eighth studio release on the New West Records label. The album was partly recorded in August 2017 as the solar eclipse travelled across the U.S., hence the album title.

With Hiatt on lead vocals and guitar, he is joined by long-time collaborators Kenneth Blevins on drums and Patrick O'Hearn on bass. New to the team is producer and musician Kevin McKendree joining in on keyboards. McKendree has worked with Delbert McClinton, Lee Roy Parnell, Tinsley Ellis and Brian Setzer. McKendree's son Yates, who was only 16 at the time, adds lead guitar.

== Release ==
The Eclipse Sessions was released by New West on October 12, 2018. The album debuted, and peaked at No. 162 on the Billboard 200 chart. "Cry to Me," "Over the Hill," and "Poor Imitation of God" were released as singles. A music video was made for "Over the Hill." Hiatt toured the US in support of the album.

== Critical reception ==
The Eclipse Sessions was met with generally favorable reviews from music critics. At Metacritic, which assigns a normalized rating out of 100 to reviews from mainstream publications, the album received an average score of 82, based on four reviews.

Professional ratings
Aggregate scores
Source	Rating
Metacritic	82/100
Review scores
Source	Rating
AllMusic	4/5 stars
All About Jazz	4/5 stars
Daily Vault	B
PopMatters	8/10

AllMusic's Mark Deming writes "The Eclipse Sessions rings true as the work of someone who has been thinking a lot about human frailty and the consequences of the choices we all must make. Hiatt is too smart to pretend he has answers to any of the emotional puzzles he's working in these tunes, but he sounds fearlessly honest as he ponders it all, and the grain in his voice gives the right texture to his contemplative delivery. And the arrangements and production on The Eclipse Sessions are well matched to the material." Eric R. Danton of Paste Magazine writes "At its core, The Eclipse Sessions shows that Hiatt remains a songwriter worth listening to: He’s a skillful lyricist with a singular voice. Yet anyone who’s been releasing albums for as long as Hiatt has tends to bury themselves under the weight of their earlier work, which fans have been imprinting on their souls for decades. If his latest album doesn’t quite rise to the level of Bring the Family or Slow Turning, well, that’s a high bar, and Hiatt is not the same person as he was in his mid-30s. But the past is past, and The Eclipse Sessions is strong enough to make an impression of its own." Chris Ingalls of PopMatters says that the album is "in many ways, exactly the kind of album we would expect from John Hiatt," but that it's also "a pleasant surprise," writing "There’s plenty of the familiar rootsy musical stylings and sharp wit we expect from him, but unique arrangements also pop out of the woodwork, reaffirming what fans have known for many years – there’s nobody quite like John Hiatt."

== Track listing ==
All tracks are written by John Hiatt.

No.	Title	Recording date	Length
1.	"Cry to Me"	August 18, 2017	3:56
2.	"All the Way to the River"	August 18, 2017	4:30
3.	"Aces up Your Sleeve"	August 18, 2017	3:22
4.	"Poor Imitation of God"	October 4, 2017	2:57
5.	"Nothing in My Heart"	August 21, 2017	4:04
6.	"Over the Hill"	October 4, 2017	4:21
7.	"Outrunning My Soul"	October 8, 2017	3:43
8.	"Hide Your Tears"	August 21, 2017	3:15
9.	"The Odds of Loving You"	October 7, 2017	4:06
10.	"One Stiff Breeze"	October 5, 2017	3:41
11.	"Robber's Highway"	October 4, 2017	4:24
Total length:			42:13

== Personnel ==
- John Hiatt – acoustic guitar, baritone guitar, electric guitar, vocals
- Kenneth Blevens – drums
- Patrick O'Hearn – bass
- Yates McKendree – guitar, slide acoustic guitar
- Kevin McKendree – piano, electric piano, organ
