= Crossing Muddy Waters =

Studio album by John Hiatt
- Released: September 26, 2000
- Recorded: April 23–26, 2000
- Studio: Hound's Ear Studio, Franklin, Tennessee
- Genre: Rock, bluegrass, folk rock
- Length: 42:58
- Label: Vanguard

John Hiatt chronology
Little Head (1997)	Crossing Muddy Waters (2000)	The Tiki Bar Is Open (2001)

Singles from Bring The Family
- 1. "Before I Go" Released: 2000

Crossing Muddy Waters is singer-songwriter John Hiatt's fourteenth album, released in 2000. A raw album recorded with no drummer, it is purely an acoustic album that brought elements of bluegrass music into his Americana sound. It was nominated for a Grammy Award in 2001 for Best Contemporary Folk Album.

== Background and recording ==
Hiatt recorded a rock album with Capitol that they didn't release. In January 2000, Hiatt got out of his contract with Capitol, and took the rock album with him. Hiatt's manager told him that an internet company wanted Hiatt to record an album to put out on the internet. Hiatt always wanted to record an acoustic album, and thought it was a good time to record it now. Eventually, Vanguard and Sanctuary came along and released the album in shops in the US and Europe respectively.

The album was recorded in just 4 days between April 23, and April 26. The album is entirely acoustic, and recorded with no drummer.

== Release ==
Crossing Muddy Waters was released by Vanguard in the US, and Sanctuary in Europe on September 26, 2000. The album debuted, and peaked at No. 110 on the Billboard 200 chart. The album also peak at No. 3 on the Billboard Top Blues Albums chart. The album was nominated for the Best Contemporary Folk Album award at the 43rd Annual Grammy Awards in 2001. "Before I Go" was released as a single from the album.

== Critical reception ==
Crossing Muddy Waters was met with generally favorable reviews from music critics. At Metacritic, which assigns a normalized rating out of 100 to reviews from mainstream publications, the album received an average score of 79, based on five reviews.

Professional ratings
Aggregate scores
Source	Rating
Metacritic	79/100
Review scores
Source	Rating
AllMusic	3/5 stars
Daily Vault	A
Melodic	5/5 stars

AllMusic's Hal Horowitz calls the album a "vast improvement over 1997's disappointing Little Head", adding "Although not quite in a class with career highlights like Bring the Family or Slow Turning, Crossing Muddy Waters is a subtle treat and an album whose watercolor brush strokes paint a vibrant picture of stirring delicacy." PopMatters writes "Where the earlier album was a stripped-down, rocking bass-drums-guitar combo, this time around Hiatt utilizes mostly acoustic instruments to give the disc a homey, back porch appeal which hearkens back to his Slow Turning and Walk On albums."

== Track listing ==
All tracks are written by John Hiatt.

No.	Title	Length
1.	"Lincoln Town"	4:03
2.	"Crossing Muddy Waters"	4:05
3.	"What Do We Do Now"	2:58
4.	"Only the Song Survives"	4:00
5.	"Lift Up Every Stone"	3:15
6.	"Take It Down"	4:00
7.	"Gone"	2:57
8.	"Take It Back"	3:04
9.	"Mr. Stanley"	3:33
10.	"God's Golden Eyes"	2:38
11.	"Before I Go"	3:34
Total length:		42:58

== Personnel ==
- John Hiatt – guitar, vocals, harmonium
- Davey Faragher – bass guitar, tambourine, harmony vocals
- David Immerglück – slide and 12-string guitar, mandolin, backing vocals

Technical

- Justin Niebank – recording, mixing
- Georgette Cartwright – creative director
- Michael Wilson – cover photography
