= Terms of My Surrender =

Studio album by John Hiatt
- Released: July 14, 2014
- Studio: Studio G, Nashville, Tennessee
- Genre: Roots rock, Americana, blues rock, folk rock
- Length: 42:38
- Label: New West
- Producer: Doug Lancio

John Hiatt chronology
Mystic Pinball (2012)	Terms of My Surrender (2014)	The Eclipse Sessions (2018)

Terms of My Surrender is singer-songwriter John Hiatt's twenty-second album, released in 2014. It was produced by Doug Lancio. The album was nominated for two Grammy Awards in 2015.

== Recording and release ==
The album was recorded in East Nashville. The album was produced by Doug Lancio, who also plays lead guitar. The entire album was recorded live in a couple of takes with his long-time backing band The Combo.

Terms of My Surrender was released by New West on July 14, 2014. The album debuted, and peaked at No. 47 on the Billboard 200 chart. The album was nominated for the Best Americana Album award at the 57th Annual Grammy Awards in 2015. The title track was nominated for Best American Roots Song the same year.

== Critical reception ==
Terms of My Surrender was met with generally favorable reviews from music critics. At Metacritic, which assigns a normalized rating out of 100 to reviews from mainstream publications, the album received an average score of 78, based on twelve reviews.

Professional ratings
Aggregate scores
Source	Rating
AnyDecentMusic?	6.9/10
Metacritic	78/100
Review scores
Source	Rating
AllMusic	3.5/5 stars
American Songwriter	4/5 stars
Consequence of Sound	C+
Cuepoint (Expert Witness)	(2-star Honorable Mention)
Daily Vault	A−
Exclaim!	8/10
The Guardian	3/5 stars
PopMatters	8/10
Record Collector	4/4 stars
Uncut	4/5 stars

Mark Deming of AllMusic writes "On Terms of My Surrender, Hiatt has the blues, and he's got the goods, and this is another solid chapter in a recording career that's drifted into an unexpected but pleasing renaissance." Craig of Louder Than War says the album is "probably his bluesiest effort since 2001’s Crossing Muddy Waters and it has the hard task of following one his best albums Mystic Pinball." Stuart Henderson of Exclaim! wrote "Terms of My Surrender is a mellow, late-night acoustic album, full of salt, gravel, whiskey and ache, but always there is this good humour, this personable rascal singing his blues for whoever's there to hear. A truly welcome return to form from a real master." Lexington Herald-Leader's Walter Tunis wrote "Ever since Bring the Family redefined his career more than 25 years ago, Hiatt has sounded remarkably comfortable in the well-worn skin he calls home. The stories on Terms of My Surrender aren't autobiographical, but they are told with enough crusty, curmudgeonly zeal to make Hiatt the master of all the bliss and wreckage before him."

== Track listing ==
All tracks are written by John Hiatt.

No.	Title	Length
1.	"Long Time Comin'"	4:12
2.	"Face of God"	3:42
3.	"Marlene"	3:01
4.	"Wind Don't Have to Hurry"	3:47
5.	"Nobody Knew His Name"	4:25
6.	"Baby's Gonna Kick"	4:07
7.	"Nothin' I Love"	4:23
8.	"Terms of My Surrender"	3:29
9.	"Here to Stay"	3:55
10.	"Old People"	4:30
11.	"Come Back Home"	3:07
Total length:		42:38

== Personnel ==
- John Hiatt – vocals, guitar, harmonica
- Doug Lancio – banjo, guitar, mandolin
- Nathan Gehri – bass
- Jon Coleman – keyboards
- Kenneth Blevins – drums, percussions
- Brandon Young – background vocals

== Chart performance ==
Chart (2014)	Peak position
Swedish Albums (Sverigetopplistan)	27
US Billboard 200	47
US Americana/Folk Albums (Billboard)	4
US Independent Albums (Billboard)	6
US Top Rock Albums (Billboard)	18
