= At Budokan =

At (the) Budokan, Live at (the) Budokan, or variants, the title of many live audio and video recordings made at Nippon Budokan, may refer to:

== 1970s ==
- Live At Budokan 1974 by The Carpenters, recorded 1974, released 1996 (video)
- Odeon Budokan by Neil Young, recorded 1976, released 2023
- Live at the Budokan by Ian Gillan Band, 1977
- Rollerworld: Live at the Budokan 1977 by Bay City Rollers, recorded 1977, released 2001
- Cheap Trick at Budokan by Cheap Trick, 1978
- Live At Nippon Budokan by Joe Yamanaka, 1978
- Bob Dylan at Budokan by Bob Dylan, recorded 1978, released 1979
- Another Budokan 1978 and The Complete Budokan 1978 by Bob Dylan, recorded 1978, released 2023
- Live in Budokan by Pink Lady, recorded 1978, released 1979

== 1980s ==
- Densetsu Kara Shinwa e: Budokan... At Last by Momoe Yamaguchi, 1980
- Budokan by Kitarō, recorded 1980, released 1983
- Live At Budokan 1980 by Yellow Magic Orchestra, recorded 1980, released 1993
- Reunion at Budokan 1981 by the Modern Jazz Quartet, 1981
- Quincy Jones Live at Budokan by Quincy Jones, 1981
- One Night at Budokan by the Michael Schenker Group, recorded 1981, released 1982
- Live At The Budokan Arena Tokyo, Japan 1983 by Asia, recorded and broadcast 1983, released 2022
- Willie Nelson Live at Budokan by Willie Nelson, recorded 1984, released 1984 (LaserDisc only) and 2022 (audio and digital video media)
- Rainbow Goblins Story / Live At Budokan by Masayoshi Takanaka, 1986

== 1990s ==
- Japan Live 1990 at Budokan by Vow Wow, 1990 (video)
- Live At Budokan by Yngwie Malmsteen, 1994 (video)
- Live at the Budokan by Blur, recorded 1995, released 1996
- Live at Budokan by Mr. Big, recorded 1994 and 1996, released 1997
- Live at the Budokan by Chic, recorded 1996, released 1999
- Niji Densetsu II - Live at Budokan - Time Machine to the Past by Masayoshi Takanaka, 1997

== 2000s ==
- Live at the Budokan by Bryan Adams, recorded 2000, released 2003
- Live at Budokan by Ozzy Osbourne, 2002
- Live at Budokan, by Sheryl Crow, recorded/broadcast 2002, released 2003
- The Judgment Day -2003.1.4. Live at Budokan- by J, 2003 (video)
- Live at Budokan by Dream Theater, 2004 (audio and video)
- Live at Budokan by Butch Walker, 2005 (video)
- Live at Budokan: Bonez Tour by Avril Lavigne, 2005 (video)
- Eizō Sakuhinshū Vol. 2 by Asian Kung-Fu Generation, recorded 2004, released 2005 (video)
- Zone Final Live in Nippon Budokan by Zone, 2005 (video)
- S.S.J.B.F. in Budōkan by S.O.A.P., 2005 (video)
- Captain Nippon Budokan by Cobra, 2008 (video)
- Budōkaaaaaaaaaan!!!!! by Perfume! 2009 (video)
- Back to Budokan by Mr. Big, 2009
- Joe Hisaishi in Budokan: 25 years with the Animations of Hayao Miyazaki by Joe Hisaishi with the New Japan Philharmonic, 2009 (video)

== 2010s ==
- Dancing at Budokan!! by Superfly, recorded 2009, released 2010 (audio and video)
- Uroboros: With the Proof in the Name of Living... - At Nippon Budokan by Dir En Grey, 2010 (video)
- This Is My Budokan?! by One Ok Rock, recorded 2010, released 2011 (video)
- SCANDAL Japan Title Match Live 2012 – SCANDAL vs Budokan by Scandal, 2012 (video)
- Experienced II: Embrace Tour 2013 Budokan, by Boom Boom Satellites, 2013 (audio and video)
- Live at Budokan: Red Night & Black Night Apocalypse a video album by Babymetal, recorded 2014, released 2015 (video)
- Budokan by Duran Duran, 2018
- 20180206 Live at Budokan by coldrain, 2018 (video)

== 2020s ==
- Live at Budokan by Helloween, 2024
- Passcode Nippon Budokan 2022 by Passcode, 2022 (video)

== Parodies ==
Albums with titles referencing Budokan which were not recorded there.

- Triple Live Möther Gööse at Budokan by Green Jellö, recorded in S.P.L. Studio, Van Nuys, CA in 1989
- Live at Budokan by Stormtroopers of Death, recorded at The Ritz in New York City in 1992
- At Budokan by Supersuckers, claimed to be recorded "in Japan" in 1994 (7 inch EP)
- Hiatt Comes Alive at Budokan? by John Hiatt, recorded at various venues in the United States, released 1994
