= Little Village (album) =

Studio album by Little Village
- Released: 18 February 1992
- Recorded: 1991
- Studios: Moula Banda Studios, Santa Monica, Hollywood, California; Ocean Way Studios, Hollywood, California
- Genre: Roots rock
- Length: 46:24
- Label: Reprise
- Producer: Little Village

Singles from Little Village
- 1. "Solar Sex Panel" Released: 1992; 2. "Don't Go Away Mad" Released: 1992

Professional ratings
Review scores
Source	Rating
AllMusic	3/5 stars

Little Village is the only studio album by the band Little Village. The band, a super-group comprising Ry Cooder, John Hiatt, Nick Lowe and Jim Keltner, released the album, went on a tour of the US and Europe to support it, and disbanded the year of its release. They had previously worked as a group while recording Hiatt's solo album Bring the Family in 1987. Although all songs are credited to all four group members, Hiatt sang all but three, with two sung by Lowe and one by Cooder. "She Runs Hot", "Solar Sex Panel" and "Don't Go Away Mad" were released as singles. The Solar Sex Panel EP contained a new non-album track "Do With Me What You Want to Do" written by Cooder/Hiatt/Keltner/Lowe and sung by Lowe, as well as a cover of the novelty song "Haunted House", originally released by Jumpin' Gene Simmons in 1964, and sung by Cooder. "Do with Me What You Want to Do" was also included as a B-side on the "Don't Go Away Mad" single.

At the Grammy Awards of 1993, Little Village was nominated for Best Rock Performance by a Duo or Group with Vocal.

== Track listing ==
All songs written by Little Village and sung by John Hiatt except where noted.

Little Village track listing
No.	Title	Lead vocals	Length
1.	"Solar Sex Panel"		3:47
2.	"The Action"	Ry Cooder	3:25
3.	"Inside Job"		4:17
4.	"Big Love"		6:26
5.	"Take Another Look"	Nick Lowe	3:40
6.	"Do You Want My Job"		5:36
7.	"Don't Go Away Mad"		3:39
8.	"Fool Who Knows"	Lowe	3:46
9.	"She Runs Hot"	Hiatt, Lowe, Cooder	3:19
10.	"Don't Think About Her When You're Trying to Drive"		4:33
11.	"Don't Bug Me When I'm Working"	Hiatt, Lowe, Cooder	3:56

== Personnel ==
Little Village

- John Hiatt – guitars, lead vocals (1, 3, 4, 6, 7, 9–11) and backing vocals, piano
- Ry Cooder – guitars, backing and lead (2, 9, 11) vocals
- Nick Lowe – bass guitar, backing and lead (5, 8, 9, 11) vocals
- Jim Keltner – drums, percussion

== Production notes ==
- Produced by Little Village
- Engineered by Ken Allardyce, Dan Bosworth, Allen Sides
- Mastered by Bernie Grundman

== Charts ==
Chart performance for Little Village
Chart (1992)	Peak position
Australian Albums (ARIA)	55
Canada Top Albums/CDs (RPM)	32
Dutch Albums (Album Top 100)	18
German Albums (Offizielle Top 100)	39
New Zealand Albums (RMNZ)	32
Norwegian Albums (VG-lista)	5
Swedish Albums (Sverigetopplistan)	16
Swiss Albums (Schweizer Hitparade)	16
UK Albums (Official Charts)	23
US Billboard 200	66
