= Thank You Girl (disambiguation) =

"Thank You Girl" is a song recorded by the Beatles, written by John Lennon and Paul McCartney.

Thank You Girl may also refer to:

- "Thank You Girl", a song by John Hiatt from his 1987 album Bring the Family
- "Thank You Girl", 1970 single by Rupert Holmes
- "Thank You Girl", 1973 single by Jimmy Ruffin
