= Riding with the King =

Riding with the King may refer to:

- Riding with the King (John Hiatt album), 1983
- Riding with the King (B. B. King and Eric Clapton album), 2000
