= Slug line =

Slug line may refer to:

- Slugging, a form of commuting
- Screenplay slug line, in film industry
- Slugline (software), in screenwriting software
- Slug Line, John Hiatt's third album
- Slugline, a fictional political blog in the US television series House of Cards
