= Walk On (John Hiatt album) =

Studio album by John Hiatt
- Released: October 24, 1995
- Studios: A&M, Hollywood, CA; Castle, Franklin, TN; Enterprise, N. Hollywood, CA; Journey Room, Malibu, CA; MC, Woodland Hills, CA
- Genres: Folk, country rock
- Length: 68:57
- Label: Capitol
- Producer: Don Smith

John Hiatt chronology
Hiatt Comes Alive at Budokan? (1994)	Walk On (1995)	Little Head (1997)

Singles from Walk On
- 1. "Cry Love" Released: 1995; 2. "Shredding the Document" Released: 1996

Walk On is singer-songwriter John Hiatt's twelfth album, released in 1995. It was his first album with Capitol Records. The album peaked at No. 48 on the Billboard 200 chart, but it only spent 5 weeks on the chart. The album also features guest appearances by the Jayhawks and Bonnie Raitt. The song "Cry Love" was nominated for the Grammy Award for Best Male Rock Vocal Performance and Best Rock Song in 1997.

== Production ==
Hiatt wrote the songs while touring to promote Perfectly Good Guitar. The guitarist David Immerglück replaced Mike Ward for the recording sessions. The album was produced by Don Smith.

== Release ==
Walk On was released by Capitol Records on October 24, 1995. The album debuted, and peaked at No. 48 on the Billboard 200 chart, selling around 21,500 units in its first week. "Cry Love" was the lead single from the album. The music video for the song was shot in Los Angeles, Piru, California, and Nashville, and directed by Mick Haggerty. The song was nominated for the Best Male Rock Vocal Performance and Best Rock Song awards at the 39th Annual Grammy Awards in 1997. "Shredding the Document" was also released as a single, and the music video was directed by Kevin Kerslake.

== Critical reception ==
Professional ratings
Review scores
Source	Rating
AllMusic	3/5 stars
Daily Vault	A
The Encyclopedia of Popular Music	4/5 stars
MusicHound Rock: The Essential Album Guide	4/5 stars
The New Rolling Stone Album Guide	3/5 stars

The Encyclopedia of Popular Music called the title track one of Hiatt's "most infectious songs." In its review, Entertainment Weekly called Hiatt "country rock’s best singer-songwriter." Trouser Press wrote that Walk On "calmly returns Hiatt to the rustic folk-roots sound of his most natural habitat, with mixed but generally positive results." The Chicago Tribune called it Hiatt's best since Bring the Family. RPM writes that Hiatt's "crusty, throaty voice is the perfect vehicle for these songs which at times sound mournful, even a little cynical, but always contain that tiny ray of hope that the best songwriters never seem to miss." The Gavin Report calls Hiatt "probably one of the greatest songwriters walking the planet," adding "Walk On has Hiatt walking tall once again."

== Track listing ==
All tracks are written by John Hiatt.

1. "Cry Love" – 4:20
2. "You Must Go" – 5:01
3. "Walk On" – 5:11
4. "Good as She Could Be" – 3:28
5. "The River Knows Your Name" – 4:25
6. "Native Son" – 3:55
7. "Dust Down a Country Road" – 4:04
8. "Ethylene" – 4:03
9. "I Can't Wait" – 4:25
10. "Shredding the Document" – 5:02
11. "Wrote It Down and Burned It" – 6:02
12. "Your Love Is My Rest" – 4:34
13. "Friend of Mine" – 14:22 (*)

(*) The song "Friend of Mine" ends at 3:22. After 2 minutes [3:22 – 5:22] begins the hidden song "Mile High" [5:22 – 14:22], included on the Capitol release but not mentioned. Listed as a bonus track on the European and BMG releases. A few seconds after Mile High, there is a second hidden track featuring audio of thunder and rain followed by a passing train.

== Personnel ==
- John Hiatt – electric guitar and acoustic guitar, vocals, electric piano, Wurlitzer
- Davey Faragher – bass guitar, background vocals
- David Immerglück – electric guitar, slide guitar, mandolin, pedal steel guitar, three-stringed guitar, background Vocals
- Michael Urbano – drums, percussion

Additional musicians

- Lisa Haley – violin on "Walk On" and "The River Knows Your Name"
- Gary Louris – background vocals on "You Must Go"
- Mark Olson – background vocals on "You Must Go"
- Bonnie Raitt – background vocals on "I Can't Wait"
- Benmont Tench – piano and harpsichord on "Shredding the Document" and pump organ on "The River Knows Your Name"

Production

- Don Smith – producer, mixer
- Tim Devine – executive producer
- Gary Gersh – executive producer
- Davey Faragher – associate producer
- Shelly Yakus – mixer
