= Love Gets Strange: The Songs of John Hiatt =

Compilation album by Various Artists
- Released: 1993
- Recorded: 1978–90
- Genre: Rock, pop, country
- Length: 73:01
- Label: Rhino

Professional ratings
Review scores
Source	Rating
AllMusic	3/5 stars

Love Gets Strange: The Songs of John Hiatt is a 1993 compilation album of songs written by John Hiatt and performed by various artists.

== Track listing ==
All songs written by John Hiatt, except where noted.

1. "Love Gets Strange" – Don Dixon – 5:39
2. "Washable Ink" – The Neville Brothers – 4:03
3. "She Said the Same Things to Me" – Johnny Adams – 4:09
4. "When We Ran" – Katy Moffatt – 4:57
5. "Pink Bedroom" – Rosanne Cash – 3:12
6. "Someplace Where Love Can't Find Me" – Marshall Crenshaw – 4:04
7. "Drive South" – Kelly Willis – 3:32
8. "Angel Eyes" (Hiatt, Fred Koller) – The Jeff Healey Band – 4:43
9. "I'll Never Get Over You" – Jo-El Sonnier – 4:55
10. "She Don't Love Nobody" – Nick Lowe – 3:25
11. "She Loves the Jerk" – Rodney Crowell – 3:40
12. "Something Happens" – Dave Edmunds – 3:16
13. "Icy Blue Heart" – Emmylou Harris – 4:10
14. "The Real One" – John Doe – 4:15
15. "Where is the Next One Coming From?" – Mitch Ryder – 3:57
16. "The Way We Make a Broken Heart" – Rosanne Cash – 3:57
17. "Any Single Solitary Heart" (Hiatt, Mike Porter) – Kris McKay – 3:55
18. "Confidence Man" – The Jeff Healey Band – 3:12
