= Little Head =

Studio album by John Hiatt
- Released: July 1, 1997
- Studio: Chapman Studios, Kansas City, MO; Sunset Sound Factory, Los Angeles, CA; Village Recorder, Los Angeles, CA
- Genre: Rock
- Length: 42:58
- Label: Capitol
- Producer: Davey Faragher, John Hiatt

John Hiatt chronology
| Walk On (1995) | Little Head (1997) | Crossing Muddy Waters (2000) |

Singles from Little Head
- 1. "Little Head" Released: 1997; 2. "Sure Pinocchio" Released: September 1997; 3. "Pirate Radio" Released: 1997

Little Head is singer-songwriter John Hiatt's thirteenth album, released in 1997. It failed to hit the top half of the Billboard 200, and it was his last album with Capitol Records. Little Head was the first album which Hiatt took a role in its production.

== Recording ==
The album was co-produced by John Hiatt and Davey Faragher, who also plays bass on the album. Hiatt wrote all of the songs on the album while on the tour supporting Walk On in 1996. Two of the songs from the album, "Graduated" and "Runaway" were recorded during the tour, in Chapman Studios, Kansas City, Missouri, and Sunset Sound Factory, Los Angeles, California, while the rest were recorded at the Village Recorder in Los Angeles.

== Release ==
Little Head was released by Capitol Records on July 1, 1997. The album debuted, and peaked at No. 111 on the Billboard 200 chart. The title track, "Sure Pinocchio" and "Pirate Radio" were released as singles.

== Critical reception ==
Professional ratings
Review scores
| Source | Rating |
|---|---|
| AllMusic | 1.5/5 stars |
| Daily Vault | B |
| Uncut | 4/5 stars |

The Independent reviewer Andy Gill writes "While clearly in more jocular mood than on 1995's admirable but downbeat Walk On, John Hiatt relinquishes none of that set's essential quality on Little Head, which may be his most approachable record yet." AllMusic's Stephen Thomas Erlewine calls the album "arguably his weakest to date," writing "By attempting to loosen up on Little Head, John Hiatt only accentuates his songwriting slump. Hiatt tentatively backs away from pure Americana, trying to make the rhythms looser and the lyrics funnier. Its supposed to be a lighthearted record, but the humor is so labored and the music so forced that it largely falls flat. But the real problem is Hiatt's shockingly listless songwriting. Although he's recycled past ideas on Perfectly Good Guitar and Walk On, his craftsmanship made those two efforts at least marginally entertaining. On Little Head, his skill has abandoned him -- there's no spark to the music, no bite to the lyrics, no hooks in the melodies."

== Track listing ==
All tracks are written by John Hiatt, except where noted.

| No. | Title | Writer(s) | Length |
|---|---|---|---|
| 1. | "Little Head" | | 3:45 |
| 2. | "Pirate Radio" | | 4:27 |
| 3. | "My Sweet Girl" | | 4:04 |
| 4. | "Feelin' Again" | | 3:45 |
| 5. | "Graduated" | | 4:38 |
| 6. | "Sure Pinocchio" | John Hiatt, Davey Faragher | 4:16 |
| 7. | "Runaway" | | 5:53 |
| 8. | "Woman Sawed in Half" | | 4:31 |
| 9. | "Far As We Go" | | 4:15 |
| 10. | "After All This Time" | | 3:24 |

== Personnel ==
- John Hiatt – guitar, vocals, piano
- Davey Faragher – bass guitar, vocals
- David Immerglück – guitar, pedal steel guitar, Dobro, electric sitar, vocals
- Gary Ferguson – drums, vocals
- Peter Holsapple – piano, organ
- Efrain Toro – percussion, vocals

Additional musicians

- Jon Brion – vibraphone, Chamberlin
- Kevin Buck – cello
- Emilio Castillo – tenor saxophone
- Bill Churchville – trumpet, flugelhorn
- Barry Danielian – trumpet, flugelhorn
- Matt Ferguson – vocals
- Jim Gilstrap – vocals
- Bob Joyce – vocals
- Stephen "Doc" Kupka – baritone saxophone
- Jean McClain – vocals
- Laura Creamer – vocals
- John Scarpulla – tenor saxophone, alto saxophone, flute
- Jeff Scornavacca – vocals
- Benmont Tench – organ
- Michael Urbano – drums
- Billy Valentine – vocals
