= Overcoats (album) =

Studio album by John Hiatt
- Released: 1975
- Studio: American Studios, Nashville; The Village Recorder, Los Angeles
- Genre: Rock
- Length: 39:59
- Label: Epic
- Producer: Glen Spreen

John Hiatt chronology
| Hangin' Around the Observatory (1974) | Overcoats (1975) | Slug Line (1979) |

Overcoats is singer-songwriter John Hiatt's second album, released in 1975 by Epic Records. Like his debut album, this album was also produced by Glen Spreen. The album failed to sell many copies, and thus Epic Records released Hiatt from his contract. He would spend the next four years without a recording contract.

Professional ratings
Review scores
| Source | Rating |
|---|---|
| AllMusic | 2/5 stars |
| Christgau's Record Guide | B |
| Record Collector | 3/4 stars |
| Record World | (unrated) |
| Rolling Stone | 3/5 stars |
| The New Rolling Stone Album Guide | 3/5 stars |

The album's artwork, which features Hiatt half-submerged in water, was an inspiration to Yoshitomo Nara, and his painting Cosmic Eyes (in the Milky Lake).

== Track listing ==
All tracks are written by John Hiatt.

Side one
| No. | Title | Length |
|---|---|---|
| 1. | "One More Time" | 3:40 |
| 2. | "Smiling in the Rain" | 4:19 |
| 3. | "I'm Tired of Your Stuff" | 3:36 |
| 4. | "Distance" | 3:34 |
| 5. | "Down Home" | 3:11 |

Side two
| No. | Title | Length |
|---|---|---|
| 1. | "Overcoats" | 6:50 |
| 2. | "I Want Your Love Inside of Me" | 3:12 |
| 3. | "I Killed an Ant with My Guitar" | 3:26 |
| 4. | "Motorboat to Heaven" | 5:27 |
| 5. | "The Lady of the Night" | 3:10 |
| Total length: | | 39:59 |

== Personnel ==
- John Hiatt – acoustic guitar, electric guitar, twelve-string guitar, percussion, piano, vocals
- Ted Reynolds – bass guitar
- Larrie Londin – drums
- Shane Keister – piano, electric piano, Moog synthesizer, Fender Rhodes

with:

- John Huey – steel guitar on "Motorboat to Heaven" and "The Lady of the Night"
- Josh Graves – dobro on "Motorboat to Heaven" and "The Lady of the Night"
- Bobby Emmons – organ on "I'm Tired of Your Stuff"
- Gene Estes – marimba on "I Killed an Ant With My Guitar"
- Tracy Nelson, Anita Baugh, Dianne Davidson, Sadie – backing vocals on "Motorboat to Heaven"
- Samuel Boghossian – viola on "Distance"
- Allan Harshman – viola on "Distance"
- Jesse Ehrlich – cello on "Distance"
- Billy Puett – clarinet, flute, recorder, soprano saxophone, tenor saxophone
- Norman Ray – baritone saxophone
- Irving Kane – trombone
- George Tidwell – trumpet, horn arrangements
