= Russ Thyret =

American music executive (1944–2021)

Russ Thyret (1944 – February 12, 2021) was an American music industry executive. He was the chairman and CEO of Warner Bros. Records from 1995 to 2001. At the time of his appointment, he had worked for the company for more than 20 years in positions which included running the Warner Bros. Records sales, marketing, and promotion departments. He is noted for his involvement with artists including Prince, whom he signed, in addition to Devo, John Fogerty, R.E.M. and others. Thyret was instrumental in the success of the labels affiliated with Warner Bros., which included Maverick Records, Qwest Records, 4AD, and Luaka Bop.
