= The Open Road (album) =

Studio album by John Hiatt
- Released: March 2, 2010
- Recorded: June–August 2009
- Length: 47:53
- Label: New West
- Producer: John Hiatt

John Hiatt chronology
Same Old Man (2008)	The Open Road (2010)	Dirty Jeans and Mudslide Hymns (2011)

The Open Road is singer-songwriter John Hiatt's nineteenth album, released in 2010. The album peaked at number 72 on the Billboard 200.

== Release ==
The Open Road was released by New West on March 2, 2010. It debuted, and peaked at No. 72 on the Billboard 200 chart.

== Critical reception ==
The album was met with generally favorable reviews from music critics. At Metacritic, which assigns a normalized rating out of 100 to reviews from mainstream publications, the album received an average score of 71, based on seven reviews.

Professional ratings
Aggregate scores
Source	Rating
Metacritic	71/100
Review scores
Source	Rating
AllMusic	3.5/5 stars
American Songwriter	4/5 stars
Creative Loafing	4/5 stars
The Irish Times	4/5 stars
PopMatters	6/10
Record Collector	4/4 stars

PopMatters writes "there will always be latent flight in a rambler like Hiatt, and it’s this spirit that keeps Hiatt going. If he keeps making records as solid as The Open Road, that spirit is something to celebrate." Terry Staunton of Record Collector calls the album "his strongest for some time," adding "While not a wholesale return to form, it’s as if he’s cloning the more satisfying parts of his back catalogue." Doug Collette of Glide Magazine calls the album a "loose, very spontaneous affair, much like its predecessor Same Old Man. But unlike that prior album, where the focus remained on the songs, the material on this new album is the means to the end of making music, during the course of which Hiatt himself is an integral member of a highly-skilled band."

== Track listing ==
All tracks are written by John Hiatt.

No.	Title	Length
1.	"The Open Road"	4:34
2.	"Haulin'"	4:07
3.	"Go Down Swingin'"	3:40
4.	"Like a Freight Train"	6:00
5.	"My Baby"	4:12
6.	"Homeland"	4:47
7.	"Wonder of Love"	3:53
8.	"What Kind of Man"	3:52
9.	"Movin' On"	4:44
10.	"Fireball Roberts"	4:28
11.	"Carry You Back Home"	3:36
Total length:		47:53

== Personnel ==
- John Hiatt - acoustic and electric guitar, vocals
- Kenneth Blevins - drums
- Doug Lancio - electric guitar
- Patrick O'Hearn - bass
