= Little Village =

American/British rock band

Little Village was an American/British rock band, formed in 1991 by Ry Cooder (guitar, vocal), John Hiatt (guitar, piano, vocal), Nick Lowe (bass, vocal), and Jim Keltner (drums). Each of the group's members had previously worked on Hiatt's 1987 album Bring the Family, and formed in 1991 while on a break from their own musical projects.

The group's name was initially (and jokingly) announced as Hiatus. It was soon changed to Little Village, in reference to the foul-mouthed in-studio diatribe by Sonny Boy Williamson II on a Chess reissue album titled Bummer Road. The group released its only album, Little Village, in early 1992. The songs were composed by all four group members and mainly sung by Hiatt, although Lowe took lead on two songs and Cooder one. While the album was met with general commercial indifference, it was nominated in 1993 for a Grammy Award as Best Rock Vocal Performance by a Duo or Group. The album peaked at No. 23 in the UK Albums Chart.

Nick Lowe later said, "Little Village was really good fun. Unfortunately, the record we did was no good. I suppose on some level, it worked, but Warner Brothers kind of gave us too much time to do it."

Little Village toured the U.S. and Europe in 1992 to support the album, but the group disbanded later that year.

== Singles ==
- "She Runs Hot" 1992 with a music video set at a NASCAR-Style track and bodyshop.
- "Solar Sex Panel", 1992
- "Don't Go Away Mad", 1992
