= Mystic Pinball =

Studio album by John Hiatt
- Released: September 25, 2012
- Recorded: 2012
- Studios: Ben's Place (Nashville, Tennessee)
- Genre: Roots rock
- Length: 45:54
- Label: New West
- Producer: Kevin Shirley

John Hiatt chronology
Dirty Jeans and Mudslide Hymns (2011)	Mystic Pinball (2012)	Terms of My Surrender (2014)

Singles from Mystic Pinball
- 1. "We're Alright Now" Released: 2012

Mystic Pinball is singer-songwriter John Hiatt's twenty-first album, released in 2012. The recording sessions took place at Ben's Studio in Nashville. The album was produced by Kevin Shirley. It features contributions from Doug Henthorn, Brandon Young, Doug Lancio, Russ Pahl, Patrick O'Hearn, Kenneth Blevins, Arlan Schierbaum, and Ron Dziubla.

In the United States, the album peaked at No. 39 on the Billboard 200, No. 6 on the Americana/Folk Albums, No. 17 on the Top Rock Albums, No. 8 on the Independent Albums and No. 15 on the Tastemakers. It also reached No. 35 on the Sverigetopplistan, No. 41 on the Dutch Album Top 100, and No. 90 on the Swiss Hitparade.

== Release ==
Mystic Pinball was released by New West on September 25, 2012. The album debuted, and peaked at No. 39 on the Billboard 200 chart, making it Hiatt's highest-charting album in the US. "We're Alright Now" was released as a single.

== Critical reception ==
Mystic Pinball was met with generally favorable reviews from music critics. At Metacritic, which assigns a normalized rating out of 100 to reviews from mainstream publications, the album received an average score of 72, based on five reviews.

Professional ratings
Aggregate scores
Source	Rating
Metacritic	72/100
Review scores
Source	Rating
AllMusic	3.5/5 stars
Classic Rock	3.5/5 stars
The Irish Times	4/5 stars
PopMatters	6/10
Record Collector	4/5 stars
Uncut	8/10

Andrew Mueller of Uncut called the work "another assemblage of breezy balladry and snarling storytelling, delivered in the familiar Cookie Monster drawl". AllMusic's Mark Deming wrote: "for a guy whose 40th year as a solo artist is appearing on the horizon, he's sounding as full of ideas and energy as a guy half his age, and Mystic Pinball confirms he's still delivering the goods in an impressive fashion". In his mixed review for PopMatters, Matt Arado stated: "an album that offers familiar pleasures without stretching for new ones". Grant Britt of No Depression writes "Hiatt’s work has always been impossible to categorize, and thankfully that shows no signs of changing. The only constant in his music is that it’s always gloriously twisted and gnarly. Once it touches you, its roots entwine you so thoroughly in Hiatt-ness that you can’t cut loose. You just relax in his embrace and wait for the next one to come along and grab you."

== Track listing ==
All tracks are written by John Hiatt.

No.	Title	Length
1.	"We're Alright Now"	4:22
2.	"Bite Marks"	3:36
3.	"It All Comes Back Someday"	3:38
4.	"Wood Chipper"	4:36
5.	"My Business"	3:06
6.	"I Just Don't Know What to Say"	4:37
7.	"I Know How to Lose You"	3:49
8.	"You're All the Reason I Need"	3:47
9.	"One of Them Damn Days"	2:46
10.	"No Wicked Grin"	3:55
11.	"Give It Up"	4:08
12.	"Blues Can't Even Find Me"	3:34
Total length:		45:54

== Personnel ==
- John Hiatt – vocals, electric guitar (tracks: 1–3, 5, 8, 9), acoustic guitar (tracks: 4, 6–8, 10–12), organ (track 4), piano (track 6)
- Doug Henthorn – backing vocals (tracks: 1–3, 8), harmony vocals (tracks: 7, 11)
- Brandon Young – backing vocals (track 4)
- Doug Lancio – electric guitar (tracks: 1–9, 11, 12), Hammertone twelve-string guitar (tracks: 7, 10), mandolin & dobro (track 12)
- Russ Pahl – pedal steel guitar (track 11)
- Patrick O'Hearn – bass (tracks: 1–9, 11, 12), fiddle (track 10)
- Kenneth Blevins – drums, percussion (tracks: 1–9, 11, 12)
- Arlan Schierbaum – piano (tracks: 3, 11), organ (track 3)
- Ron Dziubla – saxophone
- Kevin Shirley – recording, mixing, producer
- Jared Kvitka – engineering
- Leslie Richter – engineering
- Pat Thrall – additional engineering
- Bob Ludwig – mastering
- John Golden – additional mastering
- Gina R. Binkley – design
- Jack Spencer – photography
- Gary Briggs – A&R

== Charts ==
Chart (2012)	Peak position
Belgian Albums (Ultratop Flanders)	75
Belgian Albums (Ultratop Wallonia)	168
Dutch Albums (Album Top 100)	41
Swedish Albums (Sverigetopplistan)	35
Swiss Albums (Schweizer Hitparade)	90
US Billboard 200	39
US Americana/Folk Albums (Billboard)	6
US Top Rock Albums (Billboard)	17
US Independent Albums (Billboard)	8
US Indie Store Album Sales (Billboard)	15
