= Hiatt Comes Alive at Budokan? =

Live album by John Hiatt and the Guilty Dogs
- Released: November 22, 1994
- Recorded: February 26–May 30, 1994
- Genre: Rock
- Length: 76:12
- Label: A&M
- Producer: Matt Wallace

John Hiatt and the Guilty Dogs chronology
Perfectly Good Guitar (1993)	Hiatt Comes Alive at Budokan? (1994)	Walk On (1995)

Hiatt Comes Alive at Budokan? is singer-songwriter John Hiatt's first live album, released in 1994. The album was actually recorded at venues in North America; the title parodies both Peter Frampton's Frampton Comes Alive! and the At Budokan albums released by numerous artists, most famously by Cheap Trick in 1978.

Professional ratings
Review scores
Source	Rating
AllMusic	3/5 stars
The New Rolling Stone Album Guide	2.5/5 stars

Hiatt is backed on this album by the Guilty Dogs, which was recorded on the tour supporting Perfectly Good Guitar.

== Track listing ==
All tracks are written by John Hiatt, except where noted.

No.	Title	Writer(s)	Recorded at	Length
1.	"Through Your Hands"		The State Theater, Portland, ME	4:14
2.	"Real Fine Love"		The Freemont Theater, San Luis Obispo, CA	4:59
3.	"Memphis In The Meantime"		The Red Mile Racetrack, Lexington, KY	4:38
4.	"Icy Blue Heart"		Schuba's, Chicago, IL	5:42
5.	"Paper Thin"		The Red Mile Racetrack, Lexington, KY	4:29
6.	"Angel Eyes"	John Hiatt, Fred Koller	The State Theater, Portland, ME	4:54
7.	"Your Dad Did"		The Strand Theater, Providence, R.I	5:35
8.	"Have a Little Faith in Me"		The Chance Theater, Poughkeepsie, N.Y	4:17
9.	"Drive South"		The Chance Theater, Poughkeepsie, N.Y	5:02
10.	"Thing Called Love"		The Stone Ballroom, Newark, DE	5:50
11.	"Perfectly Good Guitar"		Toad's Place, New Haven, CT	5:43
12.	"Feels Like Rain"		Toad's Place, New Haven, CT	6:21
13.	"Tennessee Plates"	John Hiatt, Mike Porter	The Terrace Ballroom, Austin, TX	4:06
14.	"Lipstick Sunset"		The Von Braun Civic Center, Huntsville, AL	5:31
15.	"Slow Turning"		The State Theater, Portland, ME	4:51
Total length:				76:12

== Personnel ==
- John Hiatt – vocals, rhythm guitar, piano

The Guilty Dogs

- Michael Ward – electric guitar, background vocals
- Davey Faragher – bass guitar, background vocals
- Michael Urbano – drums, associate producer
