= Hangin' Around the Observatory =

Studio album by John Hiatt
- Released: 1974
- Recorded: July 1973
- Studio: Columbia Studio A (Nashville, Tennessee)
- Genre: Rock
- Length: 37:44
- Label: Epic
- Producer: Glen Spreen

John Hiatt chronology
Hangin' Around the Observatory (1974)	Overcoats (1975)

Singles from Hangin' Around the Observatory
- 1. "Sure As I'm Sittin' Here" Released: 1974

Hangin' Around the Observatory is the debut solo studio album by American singer-songwriter John Hiatt. It was released in 1974 through Epic Records. The recording sessions took place at Columbia Recording Studios in Nashville. The album was produced by Glen Spreen. The song "Sure As I'm Sittin' Here" was released as a single, and was covered that same year by Three Dog Night on their album Hard Labor, and was a top 20 hit.

== Reception ==
Professional ratings
Review scores
Source	Rating
AllMusic	3/5 stars
Christgau's Record Guide	B
Record Collector	3/4 stars
Rolling Stone	4/5 stars
The New Rolling Stone Album Guide	3.5/5 stars

A Billboard magazine reviewer says that the album "showcases a young writer and vocalist of obvious promise," and that "Hiatt's rich, slightly crazed and occasionally overwrought vocals are sympathetically buoyed by Glen Spreen's production, ranging from buzz-saw rock to sweet country without losing its coherence." A Record World reviewer calls Hiatt an "unusually gifted writer and performer whose voice and songs are strangely compelling and often insightful."

== Track listing ==
All tracks are written by John Hiatt.

Side one
No.	Title	Length
1.	"Maybe Baby, Say You Do"	2:35
2.	"Whistles in My Ears"	3:24
3.	"Sure As I'm Sittin' Here"	3:18
4.	"Rose"	3:05
5.	"Hangin' Around the Observatory"	3:00

Side two
No.	Title	Length
1.	"Full Moon"	5:16
2.	"Wild-Eyed Gypsies"	4:44
3.	"It's All Right with Me"	3:46
4.	"Little Blue Song for You"	3:12
5.	"Ocean"	5:24
Total length:		37:44

== Personnel ==
- John Hiatt – songwriter, arranger, design
- Glen Spreen – producer, remixing
- Gene Eichelberger – recording engineer
- Stan Hutto – recording engineer and remixing
- Ron Reynolds – recording and technical engineer
- Mike Figlio – recording engineer
- Ed Hudson – technical engineer
- Jerry Watson – technical engineer
- Charles Bradley – technical engineer
- Freeman Ramsey – technical engineer
- Lou Bradley – remixing
- Bill Barnes – design
- Peggy Owens – design
- Wilbur "Slick" Lawson – photography
