= Stolen Moments (John Hiatt album) =

Studio album by John Hiatt
- Released: June 19, 1990
- Studios: Ocean Way, Hollywood
- Genre: Rock
- Length: 52:45
- Label: A&M
- Producer: Glyn Johns

John Hiatt chronology
Slow Turning (1988)	Stolen Moments (1990)	Perfectly Good Guitar (1993)

Singles from Stolen Moments
- 1. "Child of the Wild Blue Yonder" Released: 1990; 2. "Bring Back Your Love to Me" Released: 1990; 3. "Stolen Moments" Released: 1990

Stolen Moments is singer-songwriter John Hiatt's tenth album, released in 1990. It was his highest charting solo album upon its release, peaking at No. 61 on the Billboard 200. Joan Baez later covered "Through Your Hands" on her 1992 album Play Me Backwards, and David Crosby covered it on his 1993 record Thousand Roads. Don Henley's version reached No. 33 on the US Billboard charts and appeared in the 1996 film Michael. The Nitty Gritty Dirt Band covered "The Rest of the Dream" on a 1990 album of the same title. Ilse DeLange recorded "Child of the Wild Blue Yonder" on her live album Dear John. Earl Thomas Conley had a country hit with "Bring Back Your Love to Me"; it was issued as a single in February 1990 and reached No. 11 on both the US and Canadian country charts.

The album was produced by Glyn Johns, and recorded at Ocean Way in Hollywood.

== Release ==
Stolen Moments was released by A&M Records in June 1990. The album debuted at No. 147, and peaked at No. 61 on the Billboard 200 chart. "Child of the Wild Blue Yonder" was the lead single. It debuted at No. 45, and peaked at No. 17 on the Mainstream Rock chart. A music video was made for the song. "Bring Back Your Love To Me," and "Stolen Moments" were also released as singles. The music video for "Bring Back Your Love To Me" features actress Ally Sheedy. It was directed by Blanche White, and shot in Nashville, Tennessee.

== Critical reception ==
Professional ratings
Review scores
Source	Rating
AllMusic	3.5/5 stars
Rolling Stone	4/5 stars
Select	4/5

Ira Robbins of Rolling Stone wrote, "Abandoning fiery youth for well-adjusted adulthood has left many artists with nothing to say. Not so with John Hiatt – now that he's settled down, he's just beginning to find his true voice." William Ruhlmann says that the album is a "step down from the dizzy heights of Bring the Family and Slow Turning, as he abandons his more acid commentaries and turns in a self-deprecating set full of promises of reformation and celebrations of marriage and family life. But the observations remain acute, and Hiatt's singing (so much camouflaged in his early days) is becoming his secret weapon."

== Track listing ==
All tracks are written by John Hiatt.

No.	Title	Length
1.	"Real Fine Love"	4:21
2.	"Seven Little Indians"	4:08
3.	"Child of the Wild Blue Yonder"	4:26
4.	"Back of My Mind"	4:04
5.	"Stolen Moments"	4:12
6.	"Bring Back Your Love to Me"	4:04
7.	"The Rest of the Dream"	4:51
8.	"Thirty Years of Tears"	4:08
9.	"Rock Back Billy"	3:51
10.	"Listening to Old Voices"	5:30
11.	"Through Your Hands"	4:49
12.	"One Kiss"	4:22

== Charts ==
Chart (1990)	Peak position
Australian Albums (ARIA Charts)	92

== Personnel ==
- John Hiatt – guitar, piano, vocals
- Pat Donaldson – bass guitar
- Ethan Johns – drums, guitar, mandolin, choir, chorus
- Mike Henderson – slide guitar, rhythm guitar
- Ashley Cleveland – background vocals
- Russ Taff – background vocals
- Robert Russell Bennett – choir, chorus
- Karen Peris – vocals on "Through Your Hands"
- Michael Landau – electric guitar
- Richie Hayward – drums, percussion
- Paul Wickens – synthesizer
- Bill Payne – piano on "Bring Back Your Love to Me"
- Bobby King, Willie Greene Jr. – backing vocals on "Bring Back Your Love to Me"
- Mac Gayden – slide guitar on "Thirty Years of Tears" and "Through Your Hands"
- Michael Porter – drums on "Rock Back Billy"
- David Kemper – drums on "Stolen Moments" and "Through Your Hands"
- Chuck Leavell – organ on "Stolen Moments"

Technical

- Robert Frank – cover photography
