= Dirty Jeans and Mudslide Hymns =

Studio album by John Hiatt
- Released: August 2, 2011
- Studio: Ben's Studio, Nashville, Tennessee
- Length: 51:08
- Label: New West
- Producer: Kevin Shirley

John Hiatt chronology
The Open Road (2010)	Dirty Jeans and Mudslide Hymns (2011)	Mystic Pinball (2012)

Singles from Dirty Jeans and Mudslide Hymns
- 1. "Damn This Town" Released: July 2011

Dirty Jeans and Mudslide Hymns is singer-songwriter John Hiatt's twentieth album, released in 2010. It was produced by Kevin Shirley, and recorded in Nashville, Tennessee.

== Release ==
Dirty Jeans and Mudslide Hymns was released by New West on August 2, 2011. The album debuted, and peaked at No. 59 on the Billboard 200 chart. "Damn This Town" was released as a single in July 2011.

All of the songs on the album were written by Hiatt. "I Love That Girl" was written about his wife. "Detroit Made" was covered by the Detroit-born Bob Seger on 2014's Ride Out. "When I heard the John Hiatt song," Seger recalled, "I downloaded it, put it in my car and drove around and sang harmony parts. And, of course, the subject matter's a no-brainer because we all love cars in Michigan." The song 'When New York Had Her Heart Broke" was written in Philadelphia on September 13, 2001. The song is about the September 11 attacks that happened in New York City.

== Critical reception ==
The album was met with generally favorable reviews from music critics. At Metacritic, which assigns a normalized rating out of 100 to reviews from mainstream publications, the album received an average score of 73, based on eleven reviews.

Professional ratings
Aggregate scores
Source	Rating
Metacritic	73/100
Review scores
Source	Rating
AllMusic	3.5/5 stars
American Songwriter	3.5/5 stars
Chicago Tribune	3/4 stars
Classic Rock	8/10 stars
Robert Christgau	(2-star Honorable Mention)
Rolling Stone	3.5/5 stars
PopMatters	8/10
Under The Radar	5/10 stars

AllMusic's Mark Deming says that the album is a "more polished and ambitious affair than Hiatt has delivered in years," adding, "Hiatt's craft is still potent, while his singing hasn't been this effective in years." Frank Valish of Under The Radar says the album is a "solid addition to Hiatt’s recent catalog, but often times it seems to want for more." Amanda Rigell of Isthmus writes "The best moments are when that voice betrays ragged edges, coming out in a rusty growl, then floating up to a clear, heartbreaking high note. The songs walk a strange line between menacing regret and sentimental hopefulness, and Hiatt's voice does the same. It's rare that a singer can make me scroll back on a track to hear a single phrase a second time, but I find myself wanting to hear lines again before the song was over."

== Track listing ==
All tracks are written by John Hiatt.

No.	Title	Length
1.	"Damn This Town"	4:52
2.	"'til I Get My Lovin' Back"	3:27
3.	"I Love That Girl"	4:19
4.	"All the Way Under"	3:49
5.	"Don't Wanna Leave You Now"	5:42
6.	"Detroit Made"	3:52
7.	"Hold On for Your Love"	6:21
8.	"Train to Birmingham"	3:37
9.	"Down Around My Place"	5:59
10.	"Adios to California"	3:46
11.	"When New York Had Her Heart Broke"	5:08
Total length:		51:08

== Personnel ==
- John Hiatt - vocals, acoustic and electric guitar
- Doug Lancio - electric guitars, mandolin, Hammertone
- Patrick O'Hearn - bass guitar
- Kenneth Blevins - drums

Additional musicians

- Doug Henthorn - additional backing vocals
- Russ Pahl - pedal steel guitar
- Arlan Schierbaum - keyboards
- Reese Wynans - organ on "Down Around My Place"
- Orchestration - Jeff Bova and the Bovaland Orchestra
