= Leftover Feelings =

Studio album by John Hiatt with The Jerry Douglas Band
- Released: May 21, 2021
- Recorded: October 2020
- Studio: RCA Studio B (Nashville, Tennessee); Squirrel Nest (Nashville, Tennessee)
- Genre: Roots rock, Americana, blues rock, folk rock
- Length: 41:26
- Label: New West
- Producer: Jerry Douglas

Singles from Leftover Feelings
- 1. "All The Lilacs In Ohio" Released: 2021; 2. "Mississippi Phone Booth" Released: 2021; 3. "Long Black Electric Cadilac" Released: 2021

Leftover Feelings is a collaborative album by singer-songwriter John Hiatt and The Jerry Douglas Band, released in 2021 through the record label New West Records. The album was nominated for a 2022 Grammy Award in the Best Americana Album category. Hiatt and The Jerry Douglas Band toured in support of the album.

== Recording ==
The album was recorded live during the COVID-19 pandemic in 2020, at the RCA Studio B in Nashville, Tennessee. The album was produced by Jerry Douglas, and was recorded with no drummer. They originally wanted to record the album in April, but because of the pandemic had to wait until October. The entire album was recorded in just four days. The first song recorded for the album was "All The Lilacs In Ohio." The songs "Angel" and "Slow Turning," both first recorded by Hiatt, were re-recorded for this album, but didn't make the final cut.

== Content ==
"All The Lilacs In Ohio" was first recorded by Hiatt for his fifteenth album The Tiki Bar Is Open. "Light of the Burning Sun" was written by Hiatt about his oldest brother who committed suicide when Hiatt was nine years old.

== Release ==
Leftover Feelings was released by New West on May 21, 2021. The album failed to chart on the Billboard 200 chart. The album was nominated for the Best Americana Album award at the 64th Annual Grammy Awards in 2022. "All The Lilacs In Ohio" was the lead single from the album. "Mississippi Phone Booth" and "Long Black Electric Cadillac" were also released as singles. Music videos were made for all three singles.

== Critical reception ==
Leftover Feelings was met with generally favorable reviews from music critics. At Metacritic, which assigns a normalized rating out of 100 to reviews from mainstream publications, the album received an average score of 84, based on five reviews.

Professional ratings
Aggregate scores
Source	Rating
Metacritic	84/100
Review scores
Source	Rating
AllMusic	4/5 stars
American Songwriter	4/5 stars
Uncut	4/5 stars

AllMusic's Mark Deming writes "Leftover Feelings isn't "John Hiatt's Acoustic Album," it's a solid and rewarding set of songs that sounds a bit different than usual, but finds him working with some excellent and simpatico musicians who understand his craft and play into the feel of Hiatt's material." Jim Hynes of Glide Magazine calls the album Hiatt's best since 2008's Same Old Man. Lee Zimmermann of American Songwriter says that the album "doesn’t take either artist beyond their respective comfort zones," adding "it is an outstanding album nevertheless, simply because it’s everything one would expect from a collaboration between the two. Above all, it succeeds in eliciting emotion, which is, by definition, the standard upon which most memorable music is judged."

== Track listing ==
All tracks are written by John Hiatt.

No.	Title	Length
1.	"Long Black Electric Cadillac"	3:26
2.	"Mississippi Phone Booth"	3:06
3.	"The Music Is Hot"	3:46
4.	"All The Lilacs In Ohio"	3:29
5.	"I'm In Asheville"	3:27
6.	"Light Of The Burning Sun"	4:38
7.	"Little Goodnight"	4:43
8.	"Buddy Boy"	3:27
9.	"Changes In My Mind"	3:34
10.	"Keen Rambler"	3:25
11.	"Sweet Dream"	4:29
Total length:		41:26

== Personnel ==
- John Hiatt – acoustic guitar, vocals
- Jerry Douglas – dobro, lap steel guitar, background vocals, production
- Daniel Kimbro – bass, tic-tac bass, string arrangements
- Mike Seal – acoustic guitar, electric guitar
- Christian Sedelmyer – violin, string arrangements
- Carmella Ramsey – background vocals

== Chart performance ==
Chart (2021)	Peak position
Austrian Albums (Ö3 Austria)	46
Belgian Albums (Ultratop Flanders)	25
Belgian Albums (Ultratop Wallonia)	170
German Albums (Offizielle Top 100)	28
Dutch Albums (Album Top 100)	10
Scottish Albums (OCC)	17
Swiss Albums (Schweizer Hitparade)	15
UK Americana Albums (OCC)	3
UK Independent Albums (OCC)	13
UK Jazz & Blues Albums (OCC)	3
US Top Bluegrass Albums (Billboard)	1
US Independent Albums (Billboard)	43
US Americana/Folk Albums (Billboard)	8
