= Warming Up to the Ice Age =

Studio album by John Hiatt
- Released: January 1985
- Genre: Rock
- Length: 38:51
- Label: Geffen
- Producer: Norbert Putnam

John Hiatt chronology
Riding with the King (1983)	Warming Up to the Ice Age (1985)	Bring the Family (1987)

Singles from Warming Up to the Ice Age
- 1. "She Said The Same Things to Me" Released: 1985; 2. "Living a Little, Laughing a Little" / "I'm a Real Man" Released: 1985

Warming Up to the Ice Age is singer-songwriter John Hiatt's seventh album, released in 1985. It was his last album with Geffen Records, who dropped Hiatt after the album failed to chart. It was the last Hiatt studio album to miss the Billboard 200. "The Usual" would later be covered by Bob Dylan and by George Thorogood & The Destroyers. "Living a Little, Laughing a Little", originally a hit for The Spinners, was a duet with Elvis Costello.

The album failed to build on the critical momentum of its predecessor, Riding with the King, and Hiatt found himself without a label as Geffen dropped him from their roster.

== Background and recording ==
The album was produced by Norbert Putnam, and recorded at the Bennett House in Franklin, Tennessee. During the recording of the album Hiatt was still doing drugs and drinking which, he felt, diminished the quality of the album and also meant he was short on material. "The wholeness got dissipated by my personal problems, and I think that kind of showed up on 'Warming Up to the Ice Age'. I was drinking and drugging a lot and eventually I was consumed by it. After 'Ice Age' I got sober." Influencing Hiatt's decision to become sober was the birth of his daughter Lilly in 1984. Shortly after giving birth to Lilly, Hiatt's estranged wife committed suicide, leaving him a single father. Hiatt remained sober throughout the "Warming Up to the Ice Age" tour, which he called a "scary experience".

== Release ==
Warming Up to the Ice Age was released by Geffen Records in January 1985. The album failed to reach the Billboard 200, but it did peak at number 210 on the Billboard Bubbling Under chart. "She Said The Same Things to Me", and "Living a Little, Laughing a Little" were released as singles. A music video was made for "Living a Little, Laughing a Little". Hiatt supported the album with a tour of the US, Canada and Europe.

Country music duo JJ White later recorded a cover of "The Crush" in 1991, taking their rendition to number 69 on the Hot Country Songs charts that year.

== Reception ==
Professional ratings
Review scores
Source	Rating
AllMusic	3/5 stars
The Gavin Report	(unrated)
Robert Christgau	B
The New Rolling Stone Album Guide	3/5 stars

Glenn O'Brien at Spin wrote, "It's back-to-basics, straight-ahead R&B, but it's also subtle and energetic. Hiatt enunciates up a storm with words that are patently, as they say, clever." William Ruhlmann of AllMusic highlights the tracks "The Usual" and "She Said the Same Things to Me." Billboard called the album "another superb set."

== Track listing ==
All tracks are written by John Hiatt, except where noted.

Side one
No.	Title	Writer(s)	Length
1.	"The Usual"		3:46
2.	"The Crush"		4:11
3.	"When We Ran"		4:44
4.	"She Said The Same Things to Me"		4:01
5.	"Living a Little, Laughing a Little"	Thom Bell, Linda Creed	4:03

Side two
No.	Title	Length
1.	"Zero House"	3:41
2.	"Warming Up to the Ice Age"	3:42
3.	"I'm a Real Man"	2:32
4.	"Number One Honest Game"	4:26
5.	"I Got a Gun"	3:48
Total length:		38:51

== Personnel ==
- John Hiatt – guitar, vocals
- Jesse Boyce – bass guitar, rhythm guitar on "The Usual" and "The Crush"
- Larrie Londin – drums
- Randy McCormick – keyboards

with:

- Willie Green, Jr. – bass vocals on "The Crush" and "She Said The Same Things to Me"
- Bobby King – additional vocals on "The Crush"
- Elvis Costello – additional vocals on "Living a Little, Laughing a Little"
- Jon Goin – guitar on "Living a Little, Laughing a Little", "Zero House" and "Warming Up to the Ice Age"
- Mac Gayden – rhythm guitar on "She Said The Same Things to Me"
- Frieda Woody – vocals on "Living a Little, Laughing a Little" and "She Said The Same Things to Me"
- Jerry Hey – trumpet on "The Usual" and "The Crush"
- Gary Grant – trumpet on "The Usual" and "The Crush"
- Chuck Findley – trombone on "The Usual" and "The Crush"
- Bill Reichenbach Jr. – trombone on "The Usual" and "The Crush"
- Larry Williams – saxophone on "The Usual" and "The Crush"
- Kim Hutchcroft – saxophone on "The Usual" and "The Crush"
- Anita Baugh, Dianne Davidson, Tracy Nelson – backing vocals on "Living a Little, Laughing a Little" and "Number One Honest Game"
