= All of a Sudden (album) =

Studio album by John Hiatt
- Released: March 29, 1982
- Studio: Power Station, New York City; Good Earth, London
- Genre: Rock; new wave
- Length: 42:13
- Label: Geffen
- Producer: Tony Visconti

John Hiatt chronology
| Two Bit Monsters (1980) | All of a Sudden (1982) | Riding with the King (1983) |

Singles from All of a Sudden
- 1. "I Look For Love" Released: 1982

Professional ratings
Review scores
| Source | Rating |
|---|---|
| AllMusic | 3/5 stars |
| Robert Christgau | B− |
| Rolling Stone | 3/5 stars |
| The New Rolling Stone Album Guide | 2/5 stars |

All of a Sudden is singer-songwriter John Hiatt's fifth album, released in March 1982. It was the first of three albums with Geffen Records. Hiatt toured in support of the album.

== Background and release ==
After his previous album, Two Bit Monsters, failed to chart MCA Records dropped Hiatt. In 1981, he signed with Geffen Records.

All of a Sudden was released by Geffen Records on March 29, 1982. It was produced by Tony Visconti, known for his work with David Bowie. The album peaked at number 203 on the Billboard Bubbling Under chart.

== Track listing ==
All tracks are written by John Hiatt, except where noted.

Side one
| No. | Title | Length |
|---|---|---|
| 1. | "I Look for Love" | 3:34 |
| 2. | "This Secret Life" | 3:58 |
| 3. | "Overnight Story" | 3:30 |
| 4. | "Forever Yours" | 3:48 |
| 5. | "Some Fun Now" | 3:21 |
| 6. | "The Walking Dead" | 2:54 |

Side two
| No. | Title | Writer(s) | Length |
|---|---|---|---|
| 1. | "I Could Use an Angel" | | 3:38 |
| 2. | "Getting Excited" | | 3:36 |
| 3. | "Doll Hospital" | John Hiatt, Isabella Wood | 3:03 |
| 4. | "Something Happens" | | 3:24 |
| 5. | "Marianne" | | 2:46 |
| 6. | "My Edge of the Razor" | | 4:21 |
| Total length: | | | 42:13 |

== Personnel ==
- John Hiatt – guitar, vocals
- Jesse Harms – keyboards, backing vocals
- James Rolleston – bass guitar, backing vocals
- Darrell Verdusco – drums, backing vocals

Technical

- Larry Alexander – engineer
- Nick Taggart – cover illustration
- Richard Seireeni – art direction
- Howard Rosenberg – photography
