= Two Bit Monsters =

Studio album by John Hiatt
- Released: June 1980
- Studio: International Automated Media, Irvine, California; Kitchen Sync Studios, Hollywood; Crystal Sound, Los Angeles
- Genre: Rock
- Length: 34:43
- Label: MCA
- Producer: Denny Bruce, John Hiatt

John Hiatt chronology
Slug Line (1979)	Two Bit Monsters (1980)	All of a Sudden (1982)

Alternative cover
- Album cover from Slug Line/Two Bit Monsters combo CD

Singles from Two Bit Monsters
- 1. "I Spy (For the F.B.I.)" / "Good Girl, Bad World" Released: 1980; 2. "Back to the War" / "Pink Bedroom" Released: 1980; 3. "Back to Normal" Released: 1981

Two Bit Monsters is singer-songwriter John Hiatt's fourth album, released in June 1980. It was his second of two albums with MCA Records. It failed to chart, and MCA dropped Hiatt. "It Hasn't Happened Yet" would be a minor country hit for Rosanne Cash, from her album Somewhere in the Stars. Cash also covered "Pink Bedroom", on Rhythm & Romance.

== Release ==
Two Bit Monsters was released by MCA Records in June 1980. "I Spy (For the F.B.I.)" was released as a single, with "Good Girl, Bad World" as the B-Side. "Back to the War", c/w "Pink Bedroom", and "Back to Normal" were also released as singles. The album failed to chart everywhere but Sweden, where it peaked at No. 41 on the Sverigetopplistan chart.

== Critical reception ==
Professional ratings
Review scores
Source	Rating
AllMusic	3/5 stars
Cash Box	(unrated)
Robert Christgau	B
Rolling Stone	(favorable)

The Boston Globe wrote that "Hiatt's effort is strong, angry, and intelligent... He is not content to sneer, rather, Hiatt is one to ridicule and condemn." Billboard wrote that the album "takes him [Hiatt] from the folk rock genre to the world of pop rock."

== Track listing ==
All tracks are written by John Hiatt, except where noted.

Side one
No.	Title	Writer(s)	Length
1.	"Back to Normal"		3:18
2.	"Down in Front"		3:22
3.	"I Spy (For the F.B.I.)"	Richard "Popcorn" Wylie, Herman Kelley	2:41
4.	"Pink Bedroom"		2:53
5.	"Good Girl, Bad World"		3:14
6.	"Face the Nation"		3:07

Side two
No.	Title	Length
1.	"Cop Party"	2:54
2.	"Back to the War"	3:28
3.	"It Hasn't Happened Yet"	3:22
4.	"String Pull Job"	3:22
5.	"New Numbers"	3:02
Total length:		34:43

== Personnel ==
- John Hiatt – guitar, vocals
- Howard Epstein – bass guitar, background vocals
- Shane Keister – keyboards, organ, piano
- Darrell Verdusco – drums, background vocals

Technical

- Denny Bruce – producer
- Mark Howlett – recording, mixing
- John Van Hamersveld – photography, design
