= Riding with the King (John Hiatt album) =

Riding with The King

Studio album by John Hiatt
- Released: September 1983
- Studio: The Pen, San Francisco; Eden Studios, London
- Genre: Rock
- Length: 42:05
- Label: Geffen
- Producer: Scott Mathews, Ron Nagle, Nick Lowe

John Hiatt chronology
All of a Sudden (1982)	Riding with The King (1983)	Warming Up to the Ice Age (1985)

Singles from Riding With The King
- 1. "She Loves The Jerk" Released: 1984

Riding with the King is singer-songwriter John Hiatt's sixth album, released in 1983. It was the second of three albums with Geffen Records. Ron Nagle and Scott Mathews (credited as "Scott Matthews") produced side one of the album at The Pen in San Francisco, with Mathews himself playing all instruments (except guitar) and providing all the background vocals. The second side of the album was produced by Nick Lowe at Eden Studios in London with the musicians known as the Cowboy Outfit that Lowe recorded two albums with in the mid-1980s.

The album's title track was taken from an odd dream Scott Mathews had, although he was never credited as a co-writer. It was later covered by B.B. King and Eric Clapton on their album of the same name. Hiatt reworked the lyrics for the King and Clapton collaboration. "Love Like Blood" was subsequently covered by Feargal Sharkey on his second album Songs From The Mardi Gras.

== Release ==
Riding With The King was released by Geffen Records in September 1983. The album failed to chart everywhere but Sweden, where it peaked at No. 36 on the Sverigetopplistan chart. "She Loves The Jerk" was released as a single, and a music video was made for the song. The cover art was photographed by Brian Griffin at a level crossing in Acton, London.

== Critical reception ==
Professional ratings
Review scores
Source	Rating
AllMusic	4.5/5 stars
Music Week	(unrated)
Robert Christgau	A−
Rolling Stone	3/5 stars
The New Rolling Stone Album Guide	4/5 stars

"I always kind of look at Riding with the King as the first album where I really put it altogether. I finally figured out what I was all about and found three or four styles I liked to work in", Hiatt observed about the album. Although the album failed to chart in the US, it received considerable critical acclaim with Robert Christgau observing "...this is his best album because the songs are so much his catchiest and pithiest. Most of them reflect smashed hopes." Mark Deming of AllMusic says the album "may be a bit mixed-up, but it was certainly a step in the right direction for Hiatt." Billboard wrote that "Both teams' musical verve and sly humor mate nicely with Hiatt's own thorny style, flexed in snappy rockers, uptempo love songs and typically lissome singing throughout."

== Track listing ==
All tracks are written by John Hiatt, except where noted.

Side one
No.	Title	Writer(s)	Length
1.	"I Don't Even Try"		3:25
2.	"Death by Misadventure"	John Hiatt, John Hadley	3:29
3.	"Girl on a String"		3:11
4.	"Lovers Will"		4:00
5.	"She Loves the Jerk"		3:38
6.	"Say It with Flowers"		3:06

Side two
No.	Title	Writer(s)	Length
1.	"Riding with the King"		4:18
2.	"You May Already Be a Winner"		3:35
3.	"Love Like Blood"		3:55
4.	"The Love that Harms"		2:49
5.	"Book Lovers"	Isabella Wood, John Hiatt	3:04
6.	"Falling Up"		3:35
Total length:			42:05

== Personnel ==
- John Hiatt – vocals, guitar
- Scott Mathews – producer, drums, slide guitar, bass guitar, keyboards, saxophones, backing vocals (side one only)

Musicians (side two)

- Nick Lowe – bass guitar, backing vocals
- Martin Belmont – guitar
- Paul Carrack – keyboards, backing vocals
- Bobby Irwin – drums

Technical

- Neill King – engineer
- Brian Griffin – cover photography
- Phil Smee – sleeve design
