= Slug Line =

Studio album by John Hiatt
- Released: April 1979
- Recorded: January–February 1979
- Genre: Rock
- Length: 38:22
- Label: MCA
- Producer: Denny Bruce

John Hiatt chronology
Overcoats (1975)	Slug Line (1979)	Two Bit Monsters (1980)

Singles from Slug Line
- 1. "Radio Girl" / "Sharon's Got a Drug Store" Released: April 1979; 2. "Slug Line" Released: 1979

Slug Line is singer-songwriter John Hiatt's third album, released in April 1979. It was the first of two albums with MCA Records. It was his first charting album, reaching No. 202 on Billboard's album charts, and also the highest-charting album during his first 15 years as a recording artist.

== Background and recording ==
Hiatt had spent the previous 4 years without a recording contract. After opening for musician Leo Kottke, he caught the attention of Kottke's manager and producer, Denny Bruce. Bruce put together a demo, which caught the attention of MCA Records who signed him.

Slug Line was recorded in January and February 1979, and produced by Denny Bruce.

== Release ==
Slug Line was released by MCA Records in April 1979. The album peaked at number 202 on the Billboard Bubbling Under chart. Two singles were released from the album, "Radio Girl" in April 1979, with "Sharon's Got a Drug Store" as the B-side, and "Slug Line."

== Critical reception ==
Professional ratings
Review scores
Source	Rating
AllMusic	3/5 stars
Christgau's Record Guide	B+
The Rolling Stone Album Guide	4/5 stars
Smash Hits	(favorable)

The Rolling Stone Album Guide wrote that "Hiatt evinces a talent for disarmingly pretty ballads." Record World called the album a collection of "reggae laced semi-rockers." Billboard called the album an "appealing, uptempo rock 'n roll package," and that Hiatt "infuses various elements into his style, including calypso strains at times." Cash Box said that the album "fuses crisp rock 'n' roll energy, infectious Dave Edmunds-like vocals, and of course, his highly distinctive, imaginative compositions."

== Track listing ==
All tracks are written by John Hiatt, except where noted.

Side one
No.	Title	Writer(s)	Length
1.	"You Used to Kiss the Girls"		2:36
2.	"The Negroes Were Dancing"		2:46
3.	"Slug Line"		3:02
4.	"Madonna Road"	John Hiatt, Jim Wismar	4:23
5.	"(No More) Dancin' in the Street"		2:22
6.	"Long Night"		5:18

Side two
No.	Title	Length
1.	"The Night That Kenny Died"	2:37
2.	"Radio Girl"	2:57
3.	"You're My Love Interest"	3:19
4.	"Take Off Your Uniform"	4:08
5.	"Sharon's Got a Drugstore"	2:12
6.	"Washable Ink"	3:15
Total length:		38:22

== Personnel ==
- John Hiatt – guitar, vocals
- Jon Paris – guitar, bass guitar
- Doug Yankus – guitar
- Veyler Hildebrand – bass
- Etan McElroy – piano, background vocals on "Long Night"
- B.J. Wilson – drums
- Gerry Conway – drums
- Bruce Gary – drums
- Thom Mooney – drums
- Todd Cochran – piano, organ

Technical

- Denny Bruce – producer
- Russ Gary – engineer
- John Van Hamersveld – art direction
- Nick Rozsa – cover photography
