= Perfectly Good Guitar =

Studio album by John Hiatt
- Released: September 7, 1993
- Studio: Conway (Hollywood, California); Ocean Way (Hollywood, California)
- Genre: Rock
- Length: 52:31 / 57:30
- Label: A&M
- Producer: Matt Wallace

John Hiatt chronology
Stolen Moments (1990)	Perfectly Good Guitar (1993)	Hiatt Comes Alive at Budokan? (1994)

Singles from Perfectly Good Guitar
- 1. "Perfectly Good Guitar" Released: 1993; 2. "Cross My Fingers" Released: 1993; 3. "Something Wild" Released: 1994; 4. "Buffalo River Home" Released: 1994

Perfectly Good Guitar is singer-songwriter John Hiatt's eleventh album, released in 1993. It was his last studio album with A&M Records, despite it being Hiatt's highest-charting album in the US (No. 47), Canada (No. 34), the UK (No. 67), the Netherlands (No. 13), and Sweden (No. 11). The European edition of the album contains the bonus track "I'll Never Get Over You." Iggy Pop first issued the song "Something Wild" on his 1990 album, Brick by Brick. Hiatt toured in support of the album. The tour lasted 13 months.

== Recording and release ==
The album was recorded in two weeks at the Conway Studios, and Ocean Way Recording Studios, both in Hollywood, CA. It was produced by Matt Wallace.

Perfectly Good Guitar was released by A&M Records on September 7, 1993. The album debuted and peaked at No. 47 on the Billboard 200 chart. "Perfectly Good Guitar" was the first single released. The song was inspired by a televised performance by Nirvana, where the band's bassist Krist Novoselic threw his bass into the air, intending for it to fall and shatter on the ground, but instead, the instrument ended up hitting him on the head. The single debuted at No. 37, and peaked at No. 16 on the Mainstream Rock chart. "Cross My Fingers" was the second single from the album. The third single was "Something Wild," it debuted and peaked at No. 31 on the Mainstream Rock chart. The fourth single was "Buffalo River Home." The single failed to chart, but a music video was made for it, directed by Paula Greif.

== Critical reception ==
Professional ratings
Review scores
Source	Rating
AllMusic	2.5/5 stars
Robert Christgau	(choice cut)
Rolling Stone	4/5 stars

Troy J. Augusto of Cash Box calls the album a "loose, windswept and jumping affair that sees Hiatt kick out an assortment of musicals jams, making for his most satisfying album in many a moon." AllMusic's Stewart Mason writes that producer Matt Wallace gives a "Neil Young-style guitar crunch to most of the songs," and that Hiatt "seems to borrow not only Young's guitar sound, but also his sloppy, inconsistent songwriting for this album," adding "John Hiatt has released far worse albums than Perfectly Good Guitar, but given how terrific about a third of the songs are, this album's one of his more frustrating efforts."

== Track listing ==
All tracks are written by John Hiatt, except where noted.

No.	Title	Writer(s)	Length
1.	"Something Wild"		4:31
2.	"Straight Outta Time"		4:30
3.	"Perfectly Good Guitar"		4:38
4.	"Buffalo River Home"		5:11
5.	"Angel"		3:18
6.	"Blue Telescope"		4:21
7.	"Cross My Fingers"		4:02
8.	"Old Habits"	John Hiatt, Marshall Chapman	4:42
9.	"The Wreck of the Barbie Ferrari"		4:35
10.	"When You Hold Me Tight"		5:23
11.	"Permanent Hurt"		3:22
12.	"Loving a Hurricane"		3:58
Total length:			52:31

European edition bonus track
No.	Title	Length
13.	"I'll Never Get Over You"	4:36
Total length:		57:30

== Charts ==
Chart (1993)	Peak position
Australian Albums (ARIA Charts)	83

== Personnel ==
- John Hiatt – guitar, vocals, piano, organ
- Brian MacLeod – drums, percussion
- John Pierce – bass guitar
- Dennis Locorriere – harmony vocals
- Michael Ward – guitar
- Ravi Oli – electric sitar [Ravi Oli is a pseudonym of David Immerglück]
