= Slow Turning =

Studio album by John Hiatt
- Released: August 30, 1988
- Recorded: May 20 – June 6, 1988
- Studio: Ronnie Milsap's Groundstar Labs, Nashville, Tennessee
- Genre: Rock
- Length: 48:45
- Label: A&M
- Producer: Glyn Johns

John Hiatt chronology
Bring the Family (1987)	Slow Turning (1988)	Stolen Moments (1990)

Singles from Slow Turning
- 1. "Slow Turning" Released: November 1988; 2. "Paper Thin" Released: 1988; 3. "Icy Blue Heart" Released: 1989; 4. "Drive South" Released: 1989

Slow Turning is singer-songwriter John Hiatt's ninth album, released in 1988. It provided Hiatt's only significant radio hit with the title track. The single "Slow Turning" was also featured in the 2002 motion picture drama The Rookie which starred Dennis Quaid. "Feels Like Rain" was later covered by Buddy Guy on an album of the same name and was featured in the 2004 Kate Hudson movie Raising Helen. Aaron Neville also covered "Feels Like Rain" on his 1991 album "Warm Your Heart". "Drive South" became a No. 2 country hit for Suzy Bogguss in early 1993. "Icy Blue Heart" was covered by Emmylou Harris on her 1989 album Bluebird, with backing vocals by Bonnie Raitt, and was covered later by Linda Ronstadt on her 1998 album We Ran. Ilse DeLange recorded "It'll Come To You" and "Feels Like Rain" on her live album "Dear John". During the barroom scene in the film Thelma and Louise, the band is playing "Tennessee Plates" (Charlie Sexton recorded the song for the soundtrack album).

Though not credited on the album cover, Hiatt is backed by the Goners.

== Release ==
Slow Turning was released by A&M Records on August 30, 1988. The album debuted at No. 183, and peaked at No. 98 on the Billboard 200 chart. The album spent 31 weeks on that chart. The first single from the album was the title track, released in November 1988. It debuted at No. 48, and peaked at No. 8 on the Mainstream Rock chart. "Paper Thin", which debuted at No. 46, and peaked at No. 18 on the Mainstream Rock chart, "Icy Blue Heart," and "Drive South" were also released as singles. Music videos were made for "Slow Turning" and "Drive South".

== Critical reception ==
Professional ratings
Review scores
Source	Rating
AllMusic	4.5/5 stars
Chicago Sun-Times	3.5/4 stars
Chicago Tribune	4/4 stars
Los Angeles Times	3.5/4 stars
NME	7/10
Q	5/5 stars
Record Collector	4/5 stars
Rolling Stone	4/5 stars
Uncut	8/10
The Village Voice	B+

Billboard calls the album a "noble follow-up." Cash Box calls Slow Turning "an album of myriad pleasures, characterized by weathered vocals, precise, bitter imagery and noveau-country/roots arrangements." The Gavin Report wrote "Topping last year's Bring The Family was no easy feat, yet I'd rate Slow Turning even higher." RPM wrote "No real turnaround here, just a good solid follow-up record." AllMusic reviewer Mark Deming says that "Following the best album of your career is no easy task for most performers, but with Slow Turning John Hiatt made it clear that the excellence of Bring the Family was no fluke."

== Track listing ==
All tracks are written by John Hiatt, except "Tennessee Plates", written by John Hiatt and Mike Porter.

Side one
No.	Title	Length
1.	"Drive South"	3:55
2.	"Trudy and Dave"	4:25
3.	"Tennessee Plates"	2:57
4.	"Icy Blue Heart"	4:34
5.	"Sometime Other Than Now"	4:25
6.	"Georgia Rae"	4:26

Side two
No.	Title	Length
1.	"Ride Along"	3:31
2.	"Slow Turning"	3:36
3.	"It'll Come to You"	3:29
4.	"Is Anybody There?"	5:01
5.	"Paper Thin"	3:35
6.	"Feels Like Rain"	4:51
Total length:		48:45

== Charts ==
Chart (1988)	Peak position
Australian (Kent Music Report)	71

== Personnel ==
- John Hiatt – guitar, vocals, electric piano
- Kenneth Blevins – drums, tambourine
- Sonny Landreth – electric guitar, acoustic slide guitar, 12-string guitar, National steel guitar
- David "Now" Ranson – bass guitar
- James Hooker – Hammond organ
- Bernie Leadon – guitar, mandolin, banjo, mandocello
- Ashley Cleveland – backing vocals
- Dennis Locorriere – backing vocals
- Glyn Johns – producer

Technical

- Anton Corbijn – photography
