= John Hiatt =

American musician (born 1952)

- Hiatt at South by Southwest in Austin, Texas (2010)

Background information
- Born: John Robert Hiatt; August 20, 1952 (age 74); Indianapolis, Indiana, U.S.
- Genres: Heartland rock, blues rock, folk rock, country, Americana
- Occupations: Singer-songwriter, musician
- Instruments: Vocals, guitar, piano, keyboards
- Years active: 1972–present
- Labels: MCA, A&M, Geffen, Vanguard, New West Records
- Website: www.johnhiatt.com

John Robert Hiatt (born August 20, 1952) is an American singer-songwriter. He has played a variety of musical styles on his albums, including new wave, blues, and country. Hiatt has been nominated for nine Grammy Awards and has been awarded a variety of other distinctions in the music industry.

Hiatt was working as a songwriter for Tree International, a record label in Nashville, Tennessee, when his song "Sure As I'm Sittin' Here" was covered by Three Dog Night. The song became a Top 40 hit, earning Hiatt a recording contract with Epic Records. Since then he has released 22 studio albums, two compilation albums and one live album.

== Early life ==
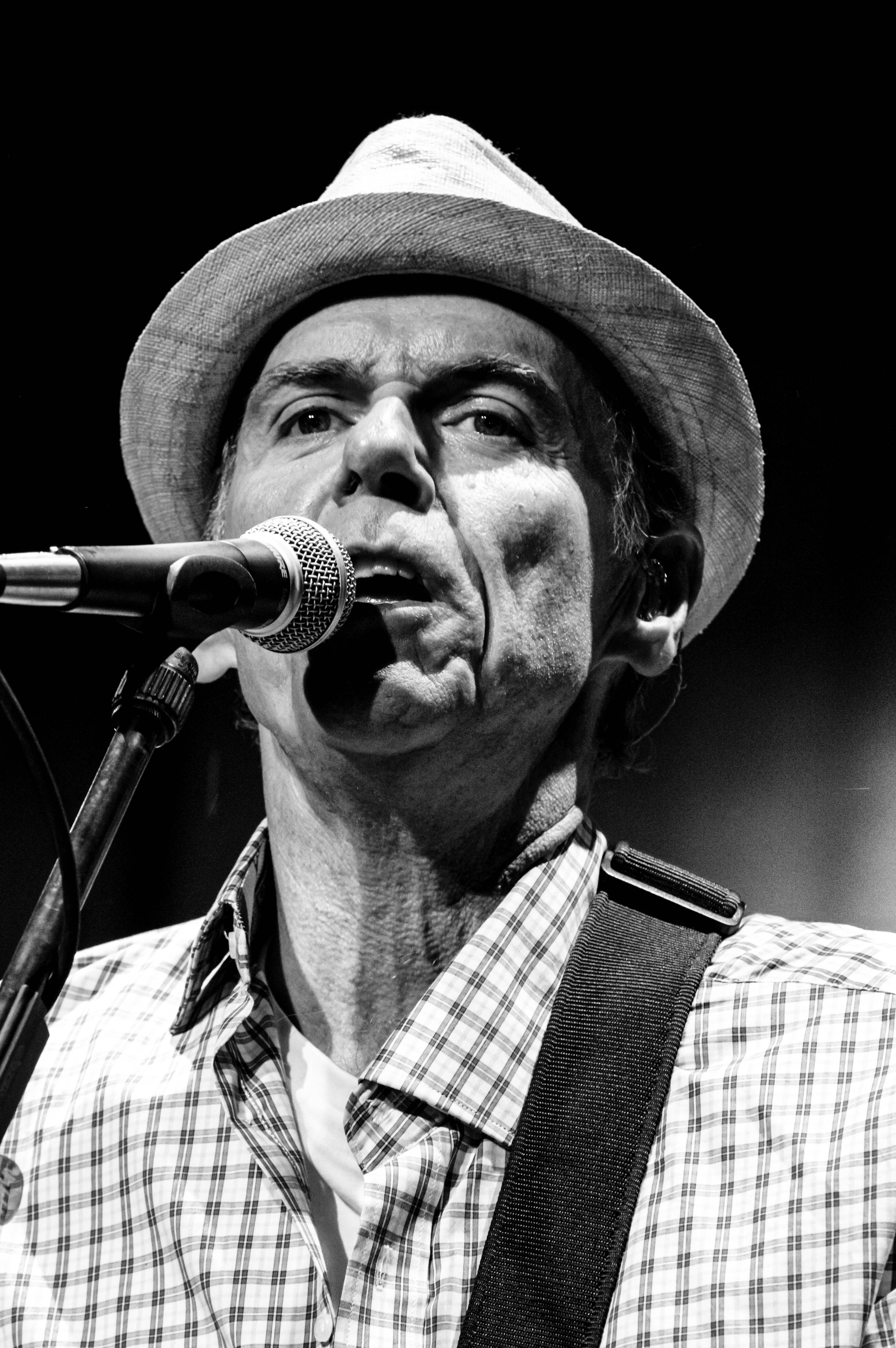
Hiatt at the Zelt-Musik-Festival 2015 in Freiburg, Germany

Hiatt was born in 1952 to Robert and Ruth Hiatt, the sixth of seven children in a Roman Catholic family from Indianapolis, Indiana. When he was 9 years old, Hiatt's 21-year-old brother Michael died by suicide. Two years later, his father died after a long illness. To escape the stress of his early life, Hiatt watched IndyCar racing and listened to Elvis Presley, Bob Dylan, and the blues. In his youth, Hiatt reports that he and several others stole a Ford Thunderbird, a crime for which he was caught by the owners but got away with posing as a hitchhiker. He learned to play the guitar when he was 11 and began his musical career in Indianapolis as a teenager. He played in various local clubs such as the Hummingbird and also with bands, including The Four-Fifths and John Lynch & the Hangmen.

== Career ==
Hiatt moved to Nashville, Tennessee, when he was 18 years old and got a job as a songwriter for the Tree-Music Publishing Company for $25 a week (equivalent to about $203 in 2024). Hiatt, who was unable to read or write scores, had to record all 250 songs he wrote for the company. In 1972 he also began playing with the band White Duck as one of three singer-songwriters within the group. White Duck had already recorded one album before Hiatt joined. He wrote and performed two songs on their second album In Season. Hiatt performed live in many clubs around Nashville with White Duck and also as a solo act.

=== Early solo career (1974–78) ===
Hiatt met Don Ellis of Epic Records in 1973, and received a record deal, releasing his first single "We Make Spirit" later that year. That same year Hiatt wrote the song "Sure as I'm Sitting Here" recorded by Three Dog Night, which went to number 16 on the Billboard chart in 1974.

In 1974, Hiatt released Hangin' Around the Observatory, which was a critical success but a commercial failure. A year later, Overcoats was released and when it also failed to sell, Epic Records released Hiatt from his contract. For the next four years he was without a recording contract. During this time his style evolved from country-rock to new wave of Elvis Costello, Nick Lowe and Graham Parker, among others.

=== MCA/Geffen years (1979–1986) ===
Hiatt was picked up by the MCA label in 1979. He released two albums for the label – Slug Line (1979) and Two Bit Monsters (1980) – neither of which met with commercial success. He received a few good reviews for these albums by critics in the Netherlands. He performed at Paradiso in Amsterdam for the first time in 1979 (opening for Southside Johnny & The Asbury Jukes) and came back often and built a solid fan base. In 1982, "Across the Borderline", written by Hiatt with Ry Cooder and Jim Dickinson, appeared on the soundtrack to the motion picture The Border, sung by country star Freddy Fender. The song was later covered on albums by Willie Nelson, Paul Young, Rubén Blades and Willy DeVille, among others, as well as by Bruce Springsteen and Bob Dylan in concert.

Hiatt was signed in 1982 to Geffen (which later absorbed MCA), where he recorded three diverse albums from 1982 to 1985. The first, All of a Sudden, was produced by Tony Visconti, and featured use of keyboards and synthesizers; his future albums combined country and soul influences. Riding with the King appeared in 1983, produced by Scott Mathews, Ron Nagle and Nick Lowe. Hiatt began making "critics choice" lists and building a large European following. The title track of Riding with the King (taken from an odd dream Scott Mathews had) was re-recorded two decades later by Eric Clapton and B. B. King and went double platinum.

During this period, Rosanne Cash covered several Hiatt compositions, taking "It Hasn't Happened Yet" to the Top 20 on the country charts. In 1983, Cash did a duet with Hiatt on his "The Way We Make a Broken Heart" produced by Nick Lowe. When Geffen failed to release the single, Cash re-recorded it in 1987 and it went to No. 1 on the US country charts. It was during this time that Asleep at the Wheel covered the song. Ricky Nelson covered "It Hasn't Happened Yet" on his 1981 album Playing to Win.

Hiatt recorded a duet with Elvis Costello, a cover version of the Spinners' song "Living a Little, Laughing a Little", which appeared on Warming Up to the Ice Age. Shortly after its release, Bob Dylan covered Hiatt's song "The Usual", which had appeared on the soundtrack to Hearts of Fire. However, Geffen dropped Hiatt from the label after Ice Age failed to chart.

=== Success (1987–1989) ===
Hiatt finally came into success in 1987, when he released Bring the Family. For the album, Hiatt had a backing band consisting of Ry Cooder, Nick Lowe, and Jim Keltner. Two of the songs on the album have been extensively covered: "Have a Little Faith in Me," which has been interpreted by a number of artists, including Joe Cocker, Delbert McClinton, Jewel, Bill Frisell, Mandy Moore and Bon Jovi; and "Memphis in the Meantime", which has been covered by Carl Perkins, Chris Smither, Spafford, and Gregg Allman. "Thank You Girl" was a moderate radio hit, and the B-side of the single featured a non-album duet with Loudon Wainwright III on a cover of the Temptations’ hit "My Girl" (Hiatt returned the favor on the B-side of Wainwright's single "Your Mother and I"). Most notably, Bonnie Raitt brought "Thing Called Love" to No. 11 on the US charts with her 1989 release Nick of Time.

Following Bring the Family, Hiatt had a string of nine straight studio albums which hit the Billboard 200.

In 1988, he returned to the studio with Glyn Johns producing to record Slow Turning, which was his first album to hit the upper half of the Billboard 200. It featured his only top 10 chart single, the title track, which hit No. 8 on the Mainstream Rock Tracks chart, and "Tennessee Plates", which was used in the soundtrack of the Ridley Scott directed and Academy Award-winning film Thelma and Louise in 1991. The Jeff Healey Band covered the Hiatt-penned song "Angel Eyes" and took it to the top five of the Billboard Hot 100.

=== 1990s and beyond ===
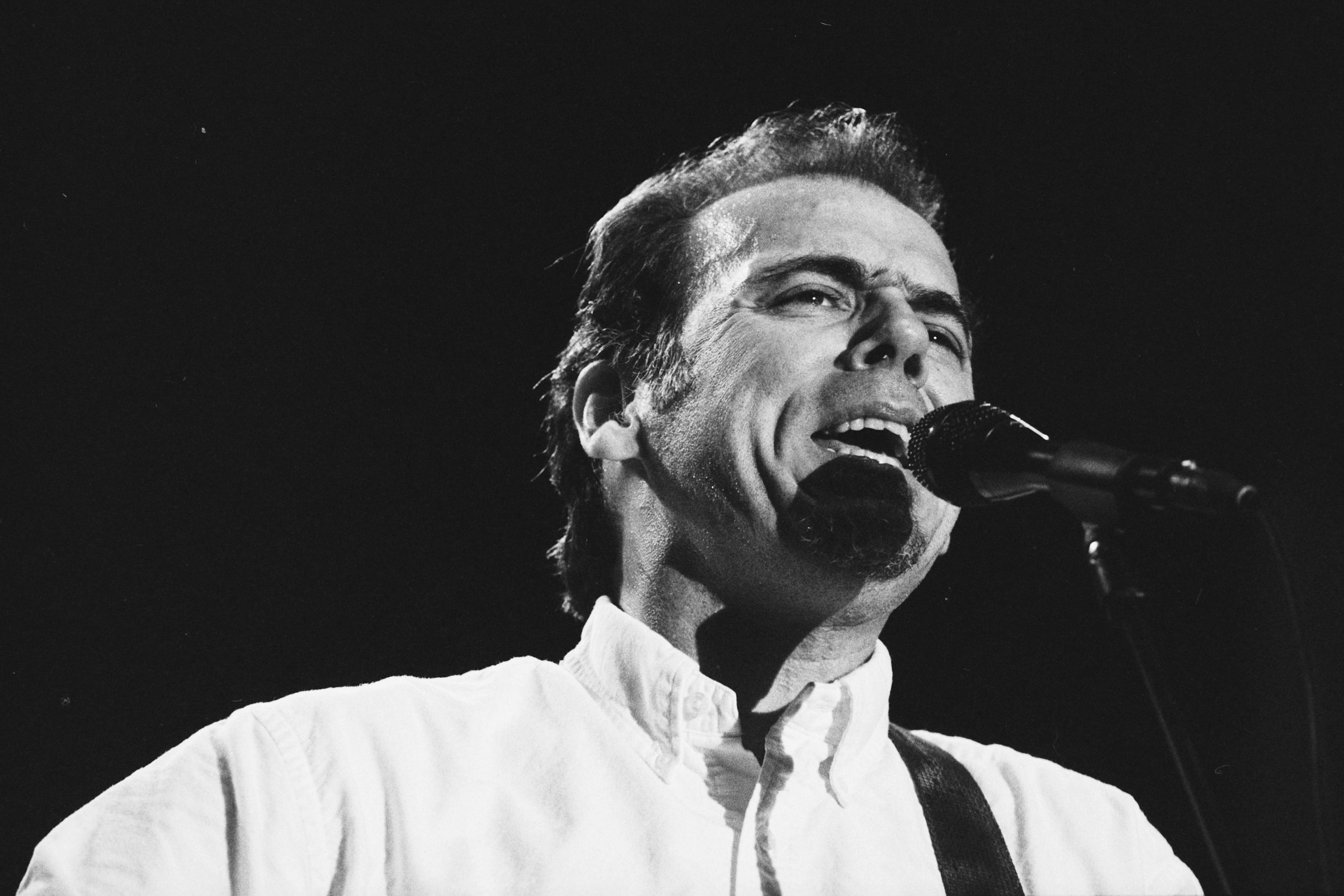
At Halfway Amsterdam festival 1994.

In 1992, Cooder, Keltner, and Lowe again backed up Hiatt, but this time they gave themselves the band name Little Village, a reference to a Sonny Boy Williamson II song. Expectations for the Little Village album were high, but the album failed to even chart as high as Hiatt's last solo album. The group disbanded after a moderately successful tour. Conversely, country artist Suzy Bogguss scored a No. 2 hit that year with a cover of Hiatt's song "Drive South."

Hiatt recorded Perfectly Good Guitar with members of alternative rock groups School of Fish and Wire Train in 1993. Hiatt recorded the album with producer Matt Wallace, who had worked most prominently with Faith No More, a band that Hiatt's 15-year-old stepson had recommended for him. It was Hiatt's highest-peaking album at No. 47, but was not the commercial breakthrough A&M expected.

Also in 1993, Love Gets Strange: The Songs of John Hiatt, a compilation album of covers of Hiatt's songs, was released. This was followed by an album of original covers Rollin' into Memphis: Songs of John Hiatt in 2000, and a second compilation album with a few originals, titled It'll Come To You...The Songs of John Hiatt, in 2003.

In 1994, Hiatt released Hiatt Comes Alive at Budokan?, his first official live album and his last album with A&M Records. A CD and DVD of his performance on Austin City Limits was released in 2005. Hiatt previously released two live promotional "official bootlegs", Riot with Hiatt in 1985, and Live at the Hiatt in 1993, as well as the EP Live at the Palace in 1991. Hiatt received his first Grammy nomination in 1995 for his album Walk On.

In 2000, Hiatt released his first independent album on Vanguard Records, Crossing Muddy Waters, which saw a heavy influence of bluegrass in his music. Later that year, he was named songwriter/artist of the year at the Nashville Music Awards. In 2001, Crossing Muddy Waters was nominated for a Grammy Award for Best Contemporary Folk Album, with Davey Faragher and David Immerglück as his only accompanists. In 2002, Hiatt performed several songs for the soundtrack of the Disney's The Country Bears movie, again with Johns producing, representing the voice of the lead singer. The movie featured covers of Hiatt songs by Bonnie Raitt and Don Henley.

Hiatt's next album, Master of Disaster, was released on June 21, 2005. The album was produced by Jim Dickinson, and Hiatt was backed up by the bassist David Hood and several members of the North Mississippi Allstars. The album achieved modest sales, becoming a top 10 independent album, but failed to achieve significant commercial success.

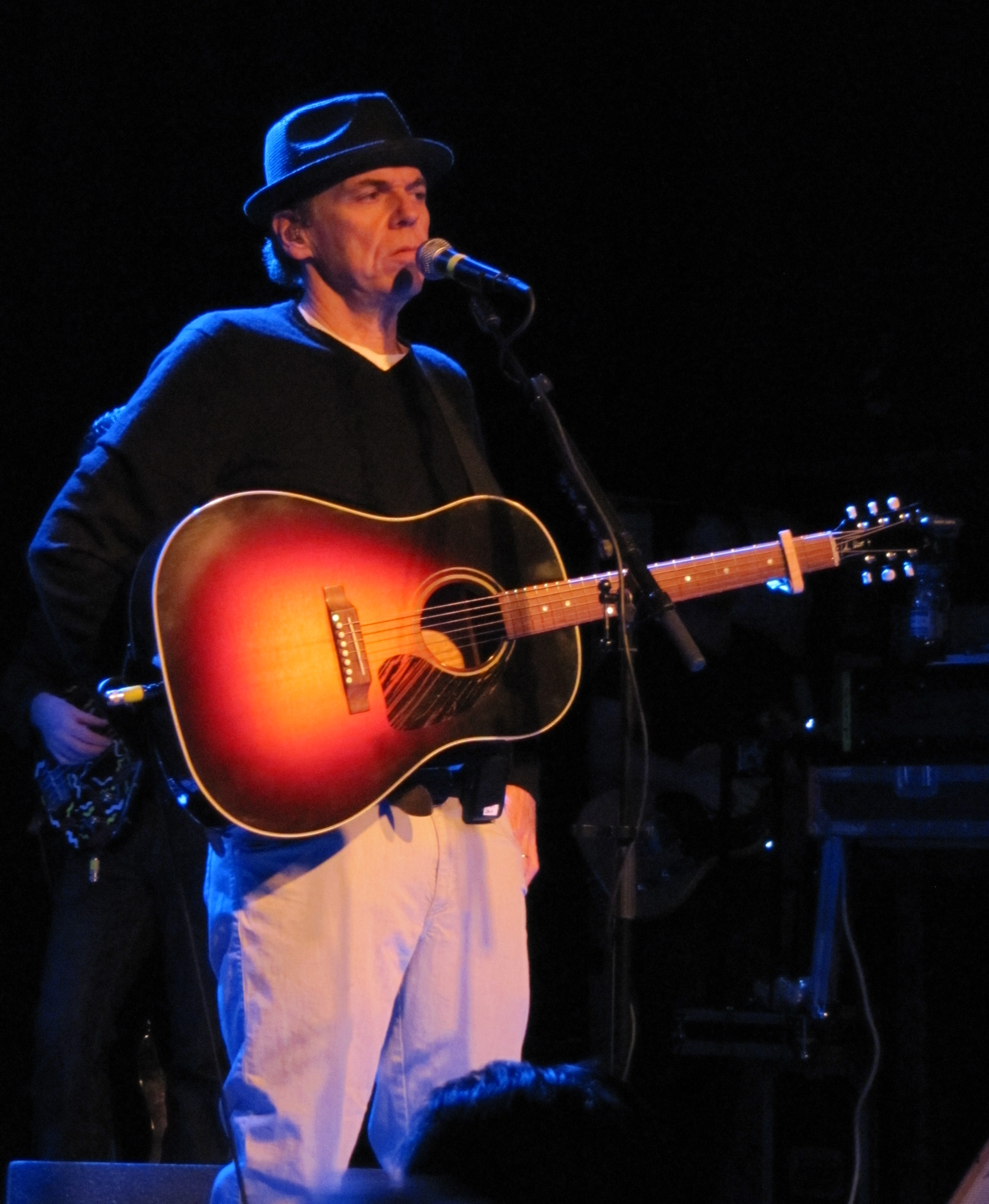
Hiatt solo in 2010

On February 12, 2008, during a concert with Lyle Lovett at the National Arts Centre in Ottawa, Ontario, Hiatt said that his new album would be titled Same Old Man. It was released on May 27, 2008.

On September 17, 2008, he appeared in Levon Helm's Ramble at the Ryman singing "The Weight" at the historic Ryman Auditorium, in Nashville.

Hiatt appeared as a performer in The House of Blues in the sixth episode of the second season of Treme, with the episode title taken from his song Feels Like Rain. The episode aired May 29, 2011.

In November 2011 Hiatt guested at Joe Bonamassa's two night Beacon Theatre, New York concerts. The following year Bonamassa released a two LP, CD and DVD capturing the two nights.

Hiatt presented an Americana Lifetime Achievement Award to Bonnie Raitt on September 12, 2012. The two performed "Thing Called Love" together at the ceremony.

On July 15, 2014, Hiatt released Terms of My Surrender, his 22nd studio album. It earned him two Grammy nominations.

On October 12, 2018, Hiatt released The Eclipse Sessions, an LP via New West Records. The album, his first in four years, was recorded over four days in the summer of 2017, a period that included the August 21 solar eclipse. Hiatt recorded the album as part of a trio of guitar, bass (Patrick O’Hearn), and drums (Kenneth Blevins).

== Personal life ==
Hiatt has two daughters, singer-songwriter Lilly Hiatt and Georgia Rae Hiatt, and a stepson, Robert. Along with singing, Hiatt is also a whistler, whistling in many of his songs.

== Discography ==
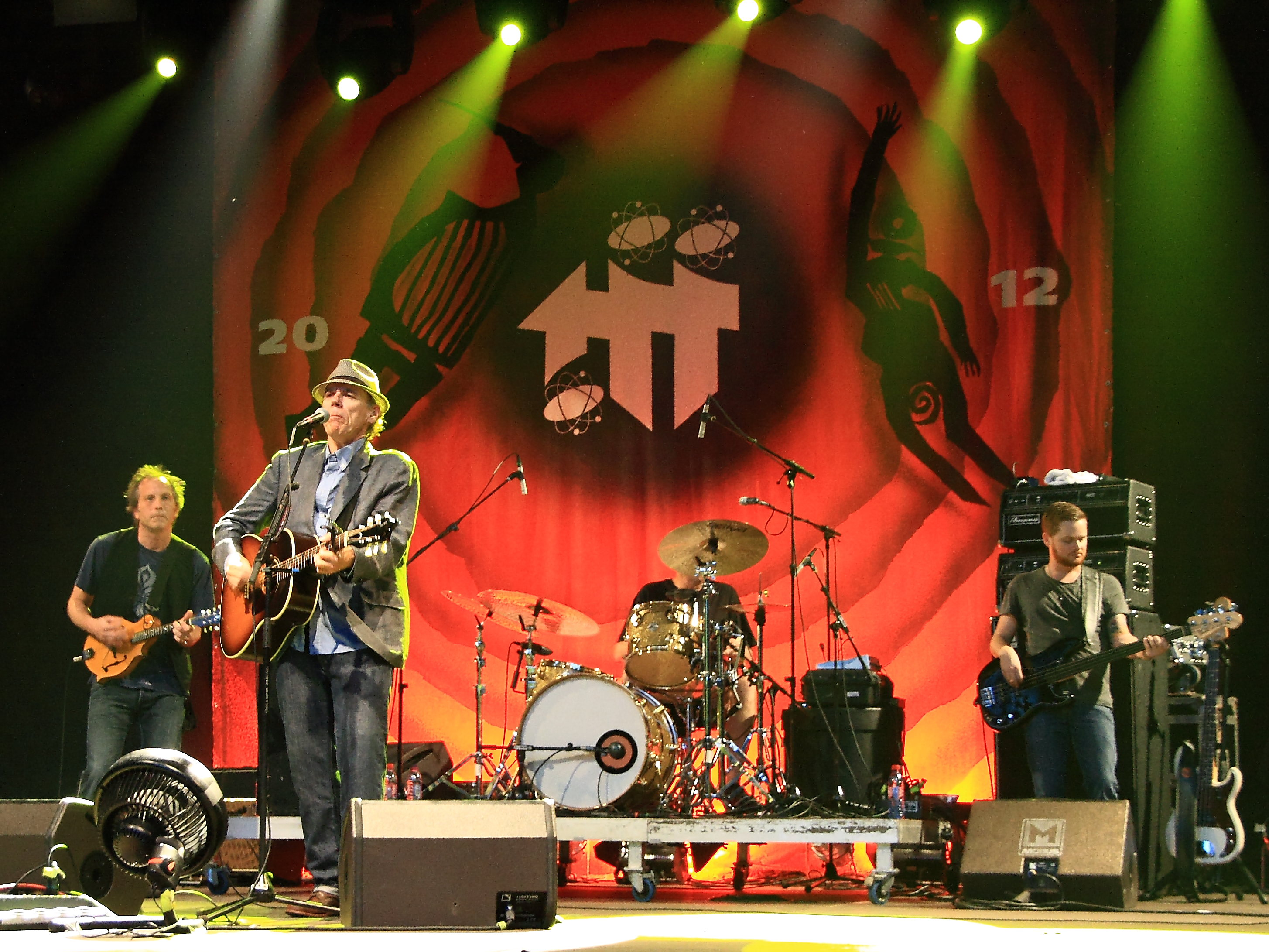
Hiatt and his backing band, The Combo, 2012

- Hangin' Around the Observatory (Epic, 1974)
- Overcoats (Epic, 1975)
- Slug Line (MCA, 1979)
- Two Bit Monsters (MCA, 1980)
- All of a Sudden (Geffen, 1982)
- Riding with the King (Geffen, 1983)
- Warming Up to the Ice Age (Geffen, 1985)
- Bring the Family (A&M, 1987)
- Slow Turning (A&M, 1988)
- Stolen Moments (A&M, 1990)
- Perfectly Good Guitar (A&M, 1993)
- Walk On (Capitol, 1995)
- Little Head (Capitol, 1997)
- Crossing Muddy Waters (Vanguard, 2000)
- The Tiki Bar is Open (Vanguard, 2001)
- Beneath This Gruff Exterior (New West, 2003)
- Master of Disaster (New West, 2005)
- Same Old Man (New West, 2008)
- The Open Road (New West, 2010)
- Dirty Jeans and Mudslide Hymns (New West, 2011)
- Mystic Pinball (New West, 2012)
- Terms of My Surrender (New West, 2014)
- The Eclipse Sessions (New West, 2018)
- Leftover Feelings – with the Jerry Douglas Band (2021)

== Awards ==
- 2000 Nashville Music Awards: Songwriter/Artist of the Year
- 2008 Americana Music Association: Lifetime Achievement Award for Songwriting
- 2019 BMI Troubador Award

Awards
| Preceded by Willie Nelson | AMA Lifetime Achievement Award for Songwriting; 2008 | Succeeded by John Fogerty |
