= Bring the Family =

Studio album by John Hiatt
- Released: June 3, 1987
- Recorded: February 17–20, 1987
- Studio: Ocean Way (Hollywood)
- Genres: Rock and roll; heartland rock
- Length: 45:26
- Label: A&M
- Producer: John Chelew

John Hiatt chronology
Warming Up to the Ice Age (1985)	Bring the Family (1987)	Slow Turning (1988)

Singles from Bring The Family
- 1. "Thank You Girl" Released: 1987; 2. "Have a Little Faith in Me" Released: 1987

Bring the Family is American singer-songwriter John Hiatt's eighth studio album, released in 1987. It was his first album to chart on the Billboard 200, and featured his first single entry on the mainstream rock chart with "Thank You Girl". It features Ry Cooder on guitar, Nick Lowe on bass guitar and Jim Keltner on drums. The four would later reform as Little Village and release an album in 1992. "Thing Called Love" later became a hit for Bonnie Raitt, and "Have a Little Faith In Me" is among Hiatt's most popular songs. "Alone In The Dark" was featured in the 1994 James Cameron film True Lies, in a memorable scene where Jamie Lee Curtis dances to the song.

== Background and recording ==
The album was recorded live, in just four days with little to no overdubs after McCabe's Guitar Shop booker John Chelew convinced Hiatt that these were some of his best songs. Hiatt was recently sober but had burned so many bridges in the music industry he did not think he had a chance of continuing. He had been dropped by his label and "wondered if I was worth a damn". Hiatt had played some solo acoustic shows at McCabe's in January 1987 just prior to recording where he debuted songs such as "Lipstick Sunset", "Your Dad Did" and "Memphis in the Meantime".

Demon Records in England still loved his work and had pledged about $30,000 if he wanted to record ("Demon Records said I sing in the shower and they'd put it out," Hiatt says. He later told the Rocky Mountain News that Demon would release an album "if I farted in a bathtub"). A&M Records in the U.S. eventually picked up the finished disc. Chelew asked Hiatt to name his dream band and Hiatt replied that he'd want to cut a record with Ry Cooder on guitar, Nick Lowe on bass, and Jim Keltner on drums. To Hiatt's surprise, he discovered all three were willing to work with him on his next album. They went into Studio 2 of Ocean Way Studios, Los Angeles and recorded the album in four days, using direct metal mastering. These songs were all that were recorded – there were no leftovers or outtakes and Hiatt had to complete a couple of songs in the studio. "I remember Ry walking out the door on the fourth day and me coming after him and going: 'Ry, I've got one more song. Could you stay?' Literally, we'd done nine and I needed one more," Hiatt has said. Budgets were so tight that Hiatt and Lowe shared a Holiday Inn room in the San Fernando Valley during the recording sessions. Lowe, an old friend of Hiatt's, took no payment for his contribution. Chelew's prediction turned out to be correct. Bring the Family is one of the cornerstones of Hiatt's career, a critical and financial success, and not a Hiatt performance goes by without a generous helping of its songs.

== Release ==
Bring The Family was released by A&M Records on June 3, 1987. The album debuted at No. 197, and peaked at No. 107 on the Billboard 200 chart. It eventually sold more than 200,000 copies. "Thank You Girl" was the first single from the album, it debuted at No. 41, and peaked at No. 27 on the Mainstream Rock chart. "Have a Little Faith in Me" was also released as a single. Music videos were made for both singles. Hiatt toured to support the album, but couldn't bring Cooder, Keltner or Lowe. Instead he hired a group of musicians known as the Goners, with which he recorded his next album, Slow Turning.

== Critical reception ==
Professional ratings
Review scores
Source	Rating
AllMusic	4.5/5 stars
Chicago Sun-Times	4/4 stars
Chicago Tribune	3.5/4 stars
Los Angeles Times	3/4 stars
The Philadelphia Inquirer	4/4 stars
Q	5/5 stars
Record Collector	5/5 stars
The Rolling Stone Album Guide	3.5/5 stars
Uncut	9/10
The Village Voice	B−

Billboard calls the album a "superb collection." The Gavin Report describes the album as "blues-based rockin' folk with wonderfully clever lyrical twists." Cash Box says that "Hiatt’s strong songwriting fills each cut with earthy honesty." Mark Deming of AllMusic called Bring The Family "the best album of Hiatt's career" and wrote "Bring the Family isn't an album about tragedy, it's about responsibility and belatedly growing up, and it's appropriate that it was a band of seasoned veterans with their own stories to tell about life who helped Hiatt bring it across; it's a rich and satisfying slice of grown-up rock & roll."

== Track listing ==
All tracks are written by John Hiatt.

Side one
No.	Title	Length
1.	"Memphis in the Meantime"	4:00
2.	"Alone in the Dark"	4:46
3.	"Thing Called Love"	4:13
4.	"Lipstick Sunset"	4:14
5.	"Have a Little Faith in Me"	4:05

Side two
No.	Title	Length
1.	"Thank You Girl"	4:11
2.	"Tip of My Tongue"	5:54
3.	"Your Dad Did"	4:03
4.	"Stood Up"	6:01
5.	"Learning How to Love You"	4:06
Total length:		45:26

== Charts ==
Chart (1987)	Peak position
Australian (Kent Music Report)	74

== Personnel ==
- John Hiatt - Acoustic guitar, vocals, Piano on "Have a Little Faith in Me"
- Ry Cooder - Electric guitar, Harmony on "Thing Called Love", Sitar on "Your Dad Did"
- Jim Keltner - drums
- Nick Lowe - Bass guitar, Harmony on "Learning How To Love You"
- John Chelew - Production
- Larry Hirsch - Recording, Engineering
- Joe Schiff - Engineering, Mixing
- Jeffrey Gold - Art direction
- Michael Hodgson - Art direction, Design
- Steven M. Martin - Photographs
