= Kenneth Blevins =

American drummer

- Born: Lake Charles, Louisiana, U.S.
- Genres: Rock, country
- Occupation: Musician
- Instrument: Drums
- Years active: 1977–present

Kenneth Blevins (born in Lake Charles, Louisiana) is an American drummer and percussionist known primarily for his session work. As a session drummer, he has contributed to the work of many well-known artists.

== Biography ==
=== Early career ===
As a child, Blevins played cornet and piano, but decided to play drums at age 14. Several years later, he was performing gigs, with an affinity for rock, blues, and Cajun music.

Blevins moved from Lake Charles to Lafayette, then Baton Rouge, then to New Orleans. After playing steadily, Blevins moved to New York City in 1989 to work as a session drummer, and to Nashville in 1993.

=== Session work ===
Blevins has been involved with more than 80 albums in his music career. Though best known for his work with John Hiatt (since 1988) and Sonny Landreth, he also has performed with Li'l Queenie and the Percolators, The Continental Drifters, and the band Tiny Town (with Tommy Malone, Pat McLaughlin, and Johnny Ray Allen).

Blevins prefers to be part of the creative process, selecting recording sessions that allow for creative input.

=== John Hiatt ===
Blevins was a member of the Goners, who backed Hiatt on his 1988 Slow Turning album. Hiatt recruited the Goners again in 2001 for The Tiki Bar Is Open, and Blevins has continued to support Hiatt on many of his albums and tours.

=== Equipment ===
Blevins uses Paiste cymbals.

== Discography ==
=== As a member of Tiny Town ===
- 1998: Tiny Town - (Pioneer Music Group)

=== With John Hiatt ===
- 1988: Slow Turning (A&M)
- 2001: The Tiki Bar is Open (Vanguard)
- 2003: Beneath This Gruff Exterior (New West)
- 2008: Same Old Man (New West)
- 2010: The Open Road (New West)
- 2011: Dirty Jeans and Mudslide Hymns (New West)
- 2012: Mystic Pinball (New West)
- 2014: Terms of My Surrender (New West)

=== With Sonny Landreth ===
- 1992: Outward Bound (Praxis)
- 1994: Exit 103A (Zoo Entertainment)
- 2005: Sonny Landreth - Grant Street (self-released)

=== With Zachary Richard ===
- 1977: Mardi Gras (Arzéd)
- 1977: Migration (CBS)

=== With Greg Trooper ===
- 1992: Everywhere (Ripe & Ready) with the Flatirons
- 1996: Noises In The Hallway (D'Ville)
- 2013: Incident on Willow Street (52 Shakes)

=== As sideman ===
- 1979: Lise Cousineau - Moi, Lise Cousineau (Le Tamanoir)
- 1980: John Mooney - Telephone King (Blind Pig)
- 1986: Spencer Bohren - Born in a Biscayne (Great Southern)
- 1987: John Magnie - Now Appearing (Rabadash)
- 1988: Raymond A Myles - New Orleans Gospel Genius (Great Southern)
- 1988: Li'l Queenie and the Percolators - My Darlin' New Orleans (Great Southern)
- 1988: Michael Doucet and Cajun Brew - Michael Doucet & Cajun Brew (Rounder)
- 1989: Spencer Bohren - Snap Your Fingers (Loft)
- 1989: Bruce Daigrepont - Coeur Des Cajuns (Rounder)
- 1990: Charles Brown - All My Life (Bullseye Blues)
- 1990: John Mooney - Late Last Night (Bullseye Blues)
- 1991: Sue Medley - Sue Medley (Mercury / PolyGram)
- 1992: Maureen McElheron - The Tune (Newport Classic)
- 1993: Chuck Prophet - Balinese Dancer (China)
- 1994: C. C. Adcock - C.C. Adcock (Island)
- 1994: Lucy Kaplansky - The Tide (Red House)
- 1994: Richard Shindell - Blue Divide (Shanachie)
- 1995: Don Williams - Borrowed Tales (American Harvest)
- 1998: Guitar Shorty - Roll Over, Baby (Black Top)
- 1999: Johnny Sansone - Watermelon Patch (Rounder)
- 2001: Susan Werner - New Non-Fiction (self-released)
- 2006: various artists - Sail Away: The Songs of Randy Newman (Sugar Hill) - track 2, "Louisiana 1927" (Sonny Landreth)
- 2010: Carol & Dale - Legacy (self-released)
- 2012: Lilly Hiatt - Let Down (Normaltown)
- 2016: John Prine - For Better, or Worse (Oh Boy)
- 2018: John Prine - The Tree of Forgiveness (Oh Boy)
