= Earth vs. The Radiators: The First 25 (album) =

Earth vs. The Radiators: the First 25

Live album by The Radiators
- Released: 2004
- Genre: Swamp rock
- Label: Image Entertainment

The Radiators chronology
The Radiators (1990)	Earth vs. The Radiators: the First 25 (2004)	Dreaming out Loud (2006)

Earth vs. The Radiators: the First 25 is the thirteenth album released by The Radiators in their twenty-five-year-long career, and their fifth live album. Recorded at a series of twenty-fifth anniversary concerts held at Tipitina's club in New Orleans—the same site where their first album, Work Done on Premises was recorded—this two CD set features numerous guest appearances by southern US musicians.

The album was released simultaneously with a concert DVD. Despite bearing the same name, the album and DVD feature almost no songs in common.

== Track listing ==
Disc 1:

1. "City of Refuge" (traditional) — 10:53
2. "Crazy Mona" (Ed Volker) — 11:06
3. "Midnight Rider" (Gregg Allman) — 3:32
4. "Junco Partner" (Shad?) — 7:12
5. "Waiting for the Rain" (Volker) — 10:11
6. "I Don't Speak Love" (Dave Malone) — 7:12
7. "Make Fire" (Volker) — 9:24
8. "Go Back the Way You Came" (Volker, Malone) — 7:15
9. "River Run" (Volker) — 11:51

Disc 2:

1. "Meet Me Down in Birdland" (Volker) — 5:00
2. "Sitting on Top of the World" (Howlin' Wolf) — 10:13
3. "Danang" (Volker) — 6:02
4. "I Like My Poison" (Volker, Malone) — 8:04
5. "Hard Rock Kid" (Volker) — 7:25
6. "Fools Go First" (Volker) — 6:59
7. "Soul on Fire" (Volker) — 7:51
8. "Wild and Free" (Volker, Malone) — 6:21
9. "Lila" (Volker) — 8:58
10. "Lovely You" (Volker) — 10:15

== Credits ==
- Ed Volker – vocals, keyboards
- Dave Malone – vocals, guitars
- Camile Baudoin – guitar
- Reggie Scanlan – bass
- Frank Bua Jr. – drums
- George Porter Jr. – (guest) bass
- Theresa Andersson – (guest) vocals
- Mark Mullins – (guest) trombone
- Karl Denson – (guest) saxophone
- Mike Skinkus – (guest) percussion
