= The Best of The Radiators: Songs from the Ancient Furnace =

The Best of the Radiators: Songs from the Ancient Furnace

Greatest hits album by The Radiators
- Released: May 27, 1997
- Genre: Swamp rock
- Label: Epic

Professional ratings
Review scores
Source	Rating
Allmusic	link

The Best of the Radiators: Songs from the Ancient Furnace is the second compilation album from The Radiators, released by Epic Records in 1997.

== Overview ==
The album features excerpts from the band's three studio albums with Epic Records, as well as seven previously unreleased tracks, including a live version of "Love is a Tangle".

== Track listing ==
1. "Nail Your Heart to Mine" (Ed Volker)
2. "Like Dreamers Do" (Volker)
3. "Confidential" (Volker)
4. "Little Paradise" (Volker)
5. "Zigzagging Through Ghostland" (Volker)
6. "Doctor Doctor" (Volker, Dave Malone, Camile Baudoin, Reggie Scanlan, Frank Bua Jr., Glenn Sears)
7. "My Whole World Flies Apart"
8. "Join the Circus"
9. "Let the Red Wine Flow" (Volker, Malone, Baudoin)
10. "Fluid Drive"
11. "End of Your Rope"
12. "Molasses" (Volker, Malone)
13. "Moving Day"
14. "Love Is a Tangle"

== Credits ==
- Ed Volker – keyboards, vocals, percussion
- Dave Malone – guitars, vocals
- Camile Baudoin – guitars, vocals
- Reggie Scanlan – bass
- Frank Bua Jr. – drums
- Glenn Sears – percussion
