= Earth vs. The Radiators: The First 25 =

Earth vs. The Radiators: the First 25
- Directed by: Geoffrey Hanson
- Written by: The Radiators
- Produced by: Geoffrey Hanson
- Starring: The Radiators
- Edited by: Serious Robots
- Music by: The Radiators
- Distributed by: Image Entertainment
- Release date: June 8, 2004
- Running time: 148 minutes
- Country: United States
- Language: English

Earth vs. The Radiators: the First 25 is a 2004 concert film by the New Orleans rock band, The Radiators. Released in honor of the band's twenty-fifth anniversary, the film contains the complete performance from their January 31, 2004 concert at Tipitina's nightclub in New Orleans, and features guest appearances by a wide variety of other musicians. Bonus features include backstage footage, band interviews, and excerpts from other concerts in their twenty-fifth anniversary series of shows.

A CD of the same name was also released, but it features an almost completely different set of songs.

== Track listing ==
Set 1:

1. "Monkey Meet" (Volker?)
2. "Let's Radiate" (Ed Volker)
3. "Last Getaway" (Volker)
4. "Waiting for the Rain" (Volker)
5. "Lila" (Volker)
6. "Little Sadie" (traditional)
7. "Confidential" (Volker)
8. "Long Hard Journey Home" (Volker)
9. "Jack O'Diamonds" (traditional)
10. "Like Dreamers Do" (Volker)

Set 2:

1. "Smoke and Dust" (Volker?)
2. "Lovely You" (Volker)
3. "Shake It Loose" (Volker?)
4. "I Like It Like That" (Chris Kenner, Allen Toussaint)
5. "Turtle Beach" (Volker)
6. "Lost What They Had" (Volker)

== Bonus Features ==
- The Radiators and Gregg Allman (features backstage footage and a joint performance of Allman's "Midnight Rider")
- Backstage with Karl Denson
- More Back Stage stuff
- The Radiators with Maceo Parker at B.B. King's, January 2, 2004
- Radiators Interview with Ken Dashow
