= Leigh Harris =

American singer and songwriter (1954–2019)

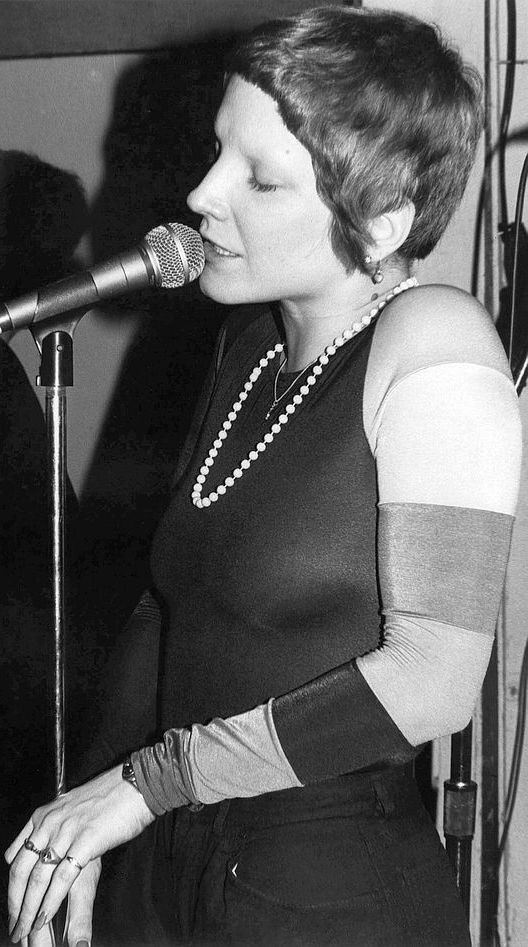
- Harris performing in 1978

Background information
- Also known as: Little Queenie
- Born: July 27, 1954; New Orleans, Louisiana, U.S.
- Died: September 21, 2019 (aged 65) Rural Hall, North Carolina, U.S.
- Genres: New Orleans R&B; jazz
- Occupation: Singer-songwriter
- Years active: 1966–2019

Leigh Harris (July 27, 1954 – September 21, 2019) was a New Orleans R&B and jazz singer and songwriter.

== Early life ==
Harris was born on July 27, 1954, in New Orleans, Louisiana, the daughter of Gertrude Morris Middleton and Allan Joseph Harris, Jr. Leigh was the eldest of three, her sisters being Sally and Ellen. Her father, a manufacturer's representative for the Allan J. Harris Company by trade, was a clarinetist, with a love for Big Band and Dixieland music. Her mother was founder and director of the Little School (a ministry of St. Martin's Church) where she also taught.

Harris showed talent at a very young age. Shortly after her first birthday, she was humming lullabies back to her parents; six months later, she'd added the lyrics... "and I haven't ever really shut my face since" she told poet John Sinclair in a 1999 interview. She performed in plays in the backyard of her family's home in Old Metairie, and was writing folk songs when she was a student at St. Martin's. Her love of rock and roll was galvanized at age 10 after she saw the Beatles perform in City Park. She performed in public for the first time at age 11 in February 1966 singing and playing her guitar at the Tulane University Student Center in their monthly Folk Festival. The hootenanny was broadcast throughout campus and into the dorms of Tulane by WTUL radio.

== Career ==
Harris was nicknamed "Little Queenie" by a former boyfriend. It was a "nickname somebody made up to get me mad, but I thought was really funny", she later told John Rockwell from the New York Times.

Harris first performed as "Little Queenie" on April Fool's Day 1975 at Jed's Bar on Oak Street in uptown New Orleans.

=== Li'l Queenie and the Percolators ===
By mid-1977, Harris had a regular Monday night set at Tipitina's with keyboardist John Magnie (also known as Johnny Zimple), who later played with The Subdudes. With the addition of other musicians, this collaboration soon evolved into Li'l Queenie and the Percolators, later called Little Queenie and the Percolators. The band played throughout Louisiana, including regular gigs at New Orleans clubs Tipitina's, Jimmy's, The Dream Palace and Snug Harbor and performed at The New Orleans Jazz & Heritage Festival.

The first incarnation of Li'l Queenie and the Percolators in 1977 consisted of Harris (vocals), John Magnie (keyboards and vocals), John Meunier (bass and vocals), Butch Gomez (sax) and Alan Pecora (drums). Saxophonist Sed Sedlack replaced Gomez and soon afterwards jazz guitarist Emily Remler joined the group for a few months. The next lineup (around 1980) introduced drummer Kenneth Blevins and Fred Kemp on saxophone.

In March 1980, Li'l Queenie and the Percolators performed for several nights at Kenny's Castaways nightclub in New York City which led to their first national press. A review in The New York Times stated "Miss Harris has more voice, personality and stage presence than any other young performer this observer has encountered in a long, long time." Sitting in for Kemp on these gigs was Fred Lipsius, the original saxophonist from Blood, Sweat & Tears.

By 1982, band members were Harris (vocals), John Magnie (keyboards and vocals), Tommy Malone (guitar), Ricky Cortes (bass) and Kenneth Blevins (drums). Other musicians joining in at various times included Charles Neville (sax), Sonny Landreth (guitar), Craig Wroten (keyboards), Earl Turbinton (sax), Phil deGruy (guitar), Tom Fitzpatrick (sax), Gregg Mazel (sax), Mike Sizer (sax), Eric Langstaff (trombone), Charles Joseph (trombone), Eric Traub (saxophone) Karl Allmon (sax), and Reggie Houston (sax).

The Percolators released one single in 1980, "My Dawlin' New Orleans," co-written by Charles Neville, Ron Cuccia and Ramsey McLean which was an instant local hit and has become a New Orleans standard. The song, later credited as "My Darlin’ New Orleans – Li'l Queenie & The Percolators" was used as the closing song on the premiere episode of HBO's Treme, and was the final song on the Treme season one soundtrack album.

The Percolators' final performance was at Tipitina's on June 7, 1982, but Harris remains "Little Queenie" in perpetuity.

Li'l Queenie and the Percolators reunited on April 29, 2007, in New Orleans, promoted as "Jimmy's Music Club Reunion Concert starring Li'l Queenie and the Percolators". The band had been the first act to play at Jimmy's when it opened in 1978.

Home, a compilation disc of Li'l Queenie and the Percolators tunes was released in October 2018.

=== Other collaborations ===
Harris, along with John Magnie, had been an integral part of Ron Cuccia's Jazz Poetry Group in July 1979; other musicians in the group were Charles Neville (sax), Ramsey McLean (bass) and Ricky Sebastian (drums).

In 1982, Harris, Magnie and guitarist Bruce MacDonald (then Harris' husband) formed Little Queenie and the Skin Twins. Another notable collaboration was a bluegrass-style band called Mixed Knots with Harris on vocals and Jimmy Robinson (guitar), Cranston Clements (guitar), Paul Clement (bass guitar), Tom Marron (fiddle), and Mitchell Moss (mandolin).

Other bands fronted by Harris' vocals included Backtalk, The Boys of Joy, Little Queenie and The Rhythm and Blues Death Squad, Red Beans and Rice Review, Roy G Biv, The Ofay Soul Choir and Little Queenie's Wahini Dakinis.

Harris also performed in duets accompanied by guitarist Phil deGruy, pianist Amasa Miller or pianist Josh Paxton.

Harris enjoyed singing with other female New Orleans vocalists including Susan Cowsill, Vicki Peterson, Suzy Malone, Holley Bendtsen, Kathleen Stieffel, Jan Clements, Annie Clements and Debbie Davis.

Over the years, Harris performed with other established New Orleans musicians including Dr. John, The Neville Brothers, and Professor Longhair. She also appeared live or on recordings with B. B. King, Elvis Costello, Sun Ra, Jerry Jeff Walker, The Guess Who, Bonerama, Wynton Marsalis, Branford Marsalis, Odetta, They Might Be Giants, The Gospel Soul Children, C. C. Adcock, Harry Connick, Jr., Buckwheat Zydeco, The Subdudes, The Neville Brothers, Astral Project, Larry Sieberth, Pete Seeger, Asleep at the Wheel, Michael Wolff's Impure Thoughts, Linton Kwesi Johnson, Roomful of Blues, Taj Mahal, Li'l Band o'Gold, NRBQ, The Louisiana Philharmonic Orchestra, Bryan Ferry, Anders Osborne, Doug Duffey, Doug Belote, Clark Vreeland and Delbert McClinton.

Director John Sayles cast Harris in two of his movies; she can be seen and heard singing "After You've Gone" in Eight Men Out and she plays the part of Kit in Passion Fish.

Harris collaborated on music for film and television in the United States and Europe, including the HBO series Treme. "My Darlin New Orleans" by Li'l Queenie and the Percolators is played (uncredited) during end-titles on the first episode of Treme. The Treme season one soundtrack album was nominated for a Grammy Award, in the category Best Compilation Soundtrack Album for Motion Picture, Television or Other Visual Media. Harris is also seen performing her original song "10 Carat Blues" with Josh Paxton in "Don't You Leave Me Here" (season 3, episode 8) of Treme.

Harris produced and recorded three solo albums. Her final album titled Purple Heart contains recordings made between 2003 and 2005, but was not released until December 2018. The album opens with a new version of "My Darlin' New Orleans". It was promoted as a benefit album to help offset Harris' medical expenses incurred following her cancer diagnosis.

Since Harris' death, her husband Rick Ledbetter has been releasing previously unavailable live recordings and unfinished/alternate takes of Harris' performances.

== Awards and honors ==
Harris was inducted (as Li'l Queenie / Leigh Harris) into the Louisiana Music Hall of Fame in 2019.

On July 25, 2019, the New Orleans City Council honored Harris by proclaiming her birthday, July 27, as "Little Queenie" Day. Her son Alex accepted the honor on his mother's behalf.

== Personal life ==
Her first marriage to guitarist Bruce MacDonald produced her only child Alex Harris MacDonald, also a musician, who performs as a rocking "skrubologist" (washboard player).

She relocated to Rural Hall, North Carolina, after floodwaters from Hurricane Katrina destroyed her New Orleans home in 2005.

In 2006 she married another musician, composer/bassist Rick Ledbetter.

In early 2016, Harris was diagnosed with Stage IV breast cancer that had invaded her brain, liver, lymph system and bones. She fought a long battle against the disease and died peacefully at her North Carolina home she called "Harmony Hill" on September 21, 2019.

== Discography ==
=== Solo albums ===
- House of Secrets (released January 1, 1999)
- Polychrome Junction (released August 2006)
- Purple Heart (released December 2018)
- Waking Up in Dreamland (EP, posthumously released November 28, 2020)
- The Rufus Sessions (posthumously released May 19, 2021)

=== Singles, tracks and videos ===
- Li’l Queenie & the Percolators (45 single on vinyl) 1980 – Ignant Records

A side – "My Darlin New Orleans"
B side – "Wild Natives"

- Leigh Harris – "Kiss" (track released April 24, 2016, from the CD Q Ball)
- Leigh Harris – "Bring A Torch, Jeanette, Isabella" (track released December 18, 2018)
- Leigh Harris – "Dog (Dawg) Days" (ode to New Orleans' summers)
- Leigh Harris with Ron Cuccia- "My Darlin' New Orleans" (updated version with added spoken word introduction)
- Leigh Harris – "If Ever I Cease to Love" (the unofficial theme of Mardi Gras)
- Leigh Harris – "Who's Lovin' You" (Live Concert at Jackson Square):
- Leigh Harris – "After You've Gone" (from John Sayles' movie Eight Men Out)
- Leigh Harris – "Cloudburst"
- Leigh Harris – "Telephone Sleeping in my Bed"
- Leigh Harris with Phil DeGruy – "Ruby" (live)
- Leigh Harris with Clark Vreeland- "Dreamland" (live)
- Leigh Harris – live at Clark Vreeland Memorial
- Leigh Harris – "When You Wish Upon A Star"
- Leigh Harris with Mixed Knots – "Falling In Love"

=== Live albums ===
- Leigh Harris, Josh Paxton and Phil deGruy – Live in NOLA w. Josh Paxton & Phil deGruy (released April 14, 2015)
- Leigh Harris – Q ball (posthumously released May 4, 2020)
- Little Queenie and the Percolators – Live at Jimmy's Oct. 20. 1979 (posthumously released May 2020)
- Little Queenie and the Percolators – Live at Tipitina's 1982 (posthumously released July 16, 2020)
- Leigh Harris – Live at the 1993 Jazz Fest Heritage Stage (posthumously released September 27, 2020)
- Leigh Harris – Live at Carrollton Station 10/23/97 (posthumously released February 21, 2021)
- Leigh Harris – Back Door Blues Review – Live at Tipitina’s (posthumously released July 12, 2021)

=== Collaborations ===
- Jazz Poetry Group (released February 1, 1979)
- Little Queenie and Backtalk (released September 1983)
- John Magnie – Now Appearing (1984, re-released on CD in 2005), with featured vocals by Leigh Harris
- Tom McDermott – Louisianthology: A Mirthful Survey of New Orleans Music (1999), with featured vocals by Leigh Harris and Davell Crawford
- Kevin Clark – New Orleans Trumpet (2000), with supporting vocals by Leigh Harris and others
- Holley Bendtsen and Amasa Miller – Our Songs (2010), with supporting vocals by Leigh Harris and others
- Li'l Queenie and the Percolators – Home (released October 2018)
- Little Queenie and Mixed Knots – QBall (posthumously released December 2019)

=== Various artist compilation albums ===
- Patchwork: A Tribute to James Booker (2003): songs "All Around the World", "Please Send Me Someone to Love" and "Providence Provides" (all performed with Larry Sieberth)
- Doctors, Professors, Kings & Queens: The Big Ol' Box of New Orleans (2004): songs "My Darlin' New Orleans" (on disc 1); "Dog Days" (on disc 2)

=== Soundtracks ===
- HBO TV series Treme: "Do You Know What It Means?" (season 1 | episode 1 (during end titles) | aired April 11, 2010), song "My Darling New Orleans" – Li'l Queenie and the Percolators (uncredited)
- Eight Men Out (1988): songs "After You've Gone" written by Henry Creamer and Turner Layton, performed by Leigh "Little Queenie" Harris; "I Be Blue" written by John Sayles and Mason Daring, performed by Leigh "Little Queenie" Harris

== Filmography ==
- Eight Men Out (1988) – Singer
- Passion Fish (1992) – Kit
- HBO TV series Treme: "Don't You Leave Me Here" (season 3 | episode 8 | aired November 11, 2012) – Leigh "Li'l Queenie" Harris and Josh Paxton performing "10 Carat Blues" at Chickie Wah Wah
