= Hayseed =

- Hayseed, a derogatory term for a yokel, an unsophisticated individual from the countryside
- Hayseed (album), a 2013 contemporary folk music album by Susan Werner
- The Hayseed, a 1919 film by Fatty Arbuckle
- Hayseed (1997 film), a 1997 Canadian comedy film
- Hayseed (2023 film), a 2023 American comedy murder mystery film
- Hayseed Stephens (1938–2003), American football player, businessman, and evangelical preacher
