= Cindy Lou =

Cindy Lou may refer to:

== Songs ==
- original title of "Peggy Sue", written by Buddy Holly, Jerry Allison and Norman Petty
- "Cindy Lou", a 1955 song by the Boogie Ramblers, later renamed Cookie and his Cupcakes
- "Cindy Lou", a 1957 song by Dick Penner
- "Little Loved One/Cindy Lou!", a 1963 single by Keith O'Conner Murphy
- "Cindy Lou", a track on the 1994 album C. C. Adcock
- "Cindy Lou", a song by French singer David Christie (born Jacques Pepino)

== Fictional characters ==
- Cindy Lou Who, in the Dr. Seuss story How the Grinch Stole Christmas! and various derived works
- Cindy Lou, in the 1943 Broadway musical Carmen Jones and the 1954 film adaptation
- Cindy Lou, a recurring character in season 3 of the Australian TV series Wentworth
- Cindy Lou, a ring name of Winona Littleheart (born 1961), retired professional wrestler

== See also ==
- Cindy-Lu Bailey (born 1965), former Australian deaf swimmer who competed in the Commonwealth Games and Deaflympics
- Cindy Lu, a member of the winning American team in the 2014 Pacific Rim Gymnastics Championships – Rhythmic Gymnastics
