= The Subdudes =

American roots rock band

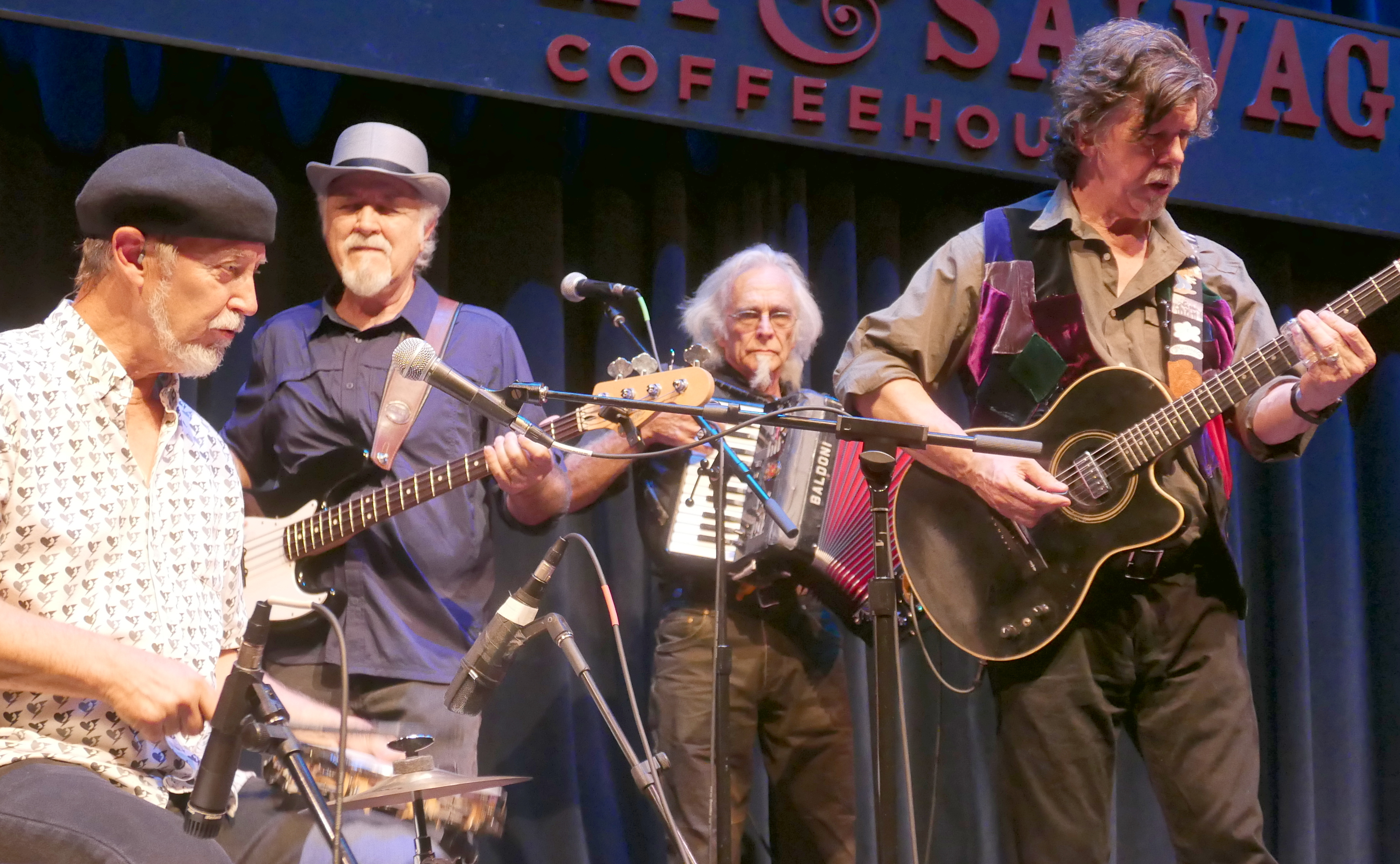
- The Subdudes performing in 2017

Background information
- Origin: New Orleans, Louisiana
- Genres: Americana; Roots rock Swamp rock Southern rock Cajun/Zydeco; New Orleans R&B; Country soul
- Years active: 1987–present
- Labels: East West, High Street, Back Porch, 429
- Members: Tommy Malone; John Magnie; Steve Amedée; Tim Cook; Jimmy Messa
- Past members: Johnny Ray Allen
- Website: www.subdudes.com

The Subdudes (styled lowercase as The subdudes) are an American roots rock group from New Orleans. Their music blends folk, swamp pop, New Orleans rhythm and blues, Louisiana blues, country, cajun/zydeco, funk, soul and gospel with harmonic vocals. Their sound is notable for the band's substitution of a tambourine player for a drummer. The subdudes formed in 1987 through a music venue in New Orleans called Tipitina's.

== History ==
The Subdudes often credit their songwriting to the group as a whole, although the primary songwriters are Tommy Malone (brother of The Radiators guitarist Dave Malone) and John Magnie, both former members of Little Queenie and the Percolators. Current members of the band are:

- Tommy Malone: vocals, acoustic, electric and slide guitars
- John Magnie: vocals, accordion, keyboards
- Steve Amedée: tambourine, drums, other percussion, and vocals
- Tim Cook: percussion, bass and vocals
- Jimmy Messa: bass and guitar

They are an Americana band with a rock-based sound that also shows soul, gospel, blues, cajun/zydeco, country, and other American roots music influences. Their former bass player was Johnny Ray Allen, who had not been with the band since their 1996 farewell tour (documented the next year on the Live at Last CD) until a brief reunion in 2014. Willie Williams also contributed to three albums: Annunciation, Primitive Streak and Live at Last as a second guitarist. Annunciation (1994) was produced in part by Glyn Johns.

After regrouping in 2002 (first as The Dudes but then re-adopting the name 'subdudes' in March 2003), Bob Dylan's guitarist Freddy Koella helped produce Miracle Mule. The album Behind the Levee (2006) was produced by bluesman Keb' Mo' and yielded a minor hit, "Papa Dukie and the Mud People" (better known by its refrain, "Love is a Beautiful Thing"). Released in late 2007, the album Street Symphony was recorded in Nashville, Tennessee, at Blackbird Studios in March 2007 and was produced by George Massenburg, who has worked with Little Feat. Released in late 2008, Live at the Ram's Head is available on CD or as a two DVD set, with one disc being the live show from "The Ram's Head" in Annapolis, Maryland, and the second DVD being Unplugged at Pleasant Plains, with interviews and live studio footage from the recording of Street Symphony in Nashville.

Most recently (2009), the band's self-produced Flower Petals was recorded in Magnie's basement studio then mixed in Miami, Florida, by The Albert Brothers and Steve Alaimo. The album was a departure for the band, being much more country-oriented than previous releases. The cover art was by William Matthews, a Denver, Colorado, artist well known for his Old West-style paintings. Flower Petals was originally slated to be recorded as the follow-up to Miracle Mule in 2004 but was nixed by the band's record company at the time, Back Porch Records. Five years later, the band members financed the recording themselves then shopped around the completed tapes.

The Subdudes' stature as New Orleans musicians was reflected by their inclusion individually and as a group in the HBO series Treme.

After a hiatus starting in 2011, the original line-up reunited in March 2014, with Johnny Ray Allen on bass. Allen died on August 8, 2014, at age 56. The band continued to tour with Tim Cook on bass. However, during the COVID pandemic, the band basically disbanded, posting a notice on bandsintown.com: "The Subdudes retired during the Covid-19 epidemic, but the members are active as solo artists and perform together on occasion."

== Discography ==
- 1987: the subdudes (privately released single sided cassette)
- 1989: The Subdudes (East West)
- 1991: Lucky (East West)
- 1994: Annunciation (High Street)
- 1994: (What A World Would Be Without) Poverty (an EP to benefit the NCH) (High Street)
- 1996: Primitive Streak (High Street)
- 1997: Live at Last (High Street)
- 2004: Miracle Mule (EMI/Back Porch)
- 2006: Behind the Levee (EMI/Back Porch)
- 2007: Street Symphony (EMI/Back Porch)
- 2008: Live at the Ram's Head (Biographica)
- 2009: Flower Petals (429 Records)
- 2016: 4 on the Floor (I. Malone. Songs and Sleeping Elephant Music)
- 2019: Lickskillet
