= The Strat Pack =

2005 concert film

The Strat Pack: Live in Concert
- Directed by: Aubrey Powell
- Produced by: Perry Joseph
- Starring: Joe Walsh; David Gilmour; Brian May; Paul Rodgers; Ronnie Wood; Hank Marvin; The Crickets; Albert Lee; Gary Moore; Mike Rutherford; Phil Palmer; Paul Carrack; Phil Manzanera; Amy Winehouse; Jamie Cullum; Theresa Andersson
- Distributed by: Eagle Vision
- Release date: 3 May 2005
- Running time: 115 minutes
- Language: English

The Strat Pack: Live in Concert is a film of a 24 September 2004 concert featuring Joe Walsh, Gary Moore, Brian May, Hank Marvin, David Gilmour, Mike Rutherford, and many more musicians, marking the 50th anniversary of the Fender Stratocaster guitar. The film was released in 2005.

== Track listing ==
1. "Peggy Sue" (Jerry Allison, Buddy Holly, Norman Petty)
2. "Maybe Baby" (Holly, Petty)
3. "I Fought the Law" (Sonny Curtis)
4. "Oh Boy" (Petty, Bill Tilghman, Sonny West)
5. "That'll Be the Day" (Allison, Holly)
  - Tracks 1–4 performed by the Crickets, Albert Lee, and Brian May
  - Track 5 performed by the Crickets, Albert Lee, Brian May, and Ronnie Wood
6. "The Rise and Fall of Flingel Bunt" (Brian Bennett, Hank Marvin, John Rostill, Bruce Welch)
7. "Sleep Walk" (Ann Farina, Johnny Farina, Santo Farina, Don Wolf)
8. "Apache" (Jerry Lordan)
  - Tracks 6–8 performed by Hank Marvin and Ben Marvin
9. "I'm on My Way" (Theresa Andersson)
  - Performed by Theresa Andersson
10. "Country Boy" (Tony Colton, Albert Lee, Ray Smith)
  - Performed by Albert Lee and Theresa Andersson
11. "How Long" (Paul Carrack)
12. "All Along the Watchtower" (Bob Dylan) with Andy Fairweather-Low
13. "While My Guitar Gently Weeps" (George Harrison) with Andy Fairweather-Low
14. "I Can't Dance" (Tony Banks, Phil Collins, Mike Rutherford)
  - Tracks 11–14 performed by Mike Rutherford and Paul Carrack
15. "Red House" (Jimi Hendrix)
  - Performed by Gary Moore
16. "Angel" (Hendrix)
  - Performed by Jamie Cullum
17. "Take the Box" (Luke Smith, Amy Winehouse)
18. "In My Bed" (Salaam Remi, Winehouse)
19. "Stronger than Me" (Remi, Winehouse)
  - Tracks 17–19 performed by Amy Winehouse
20. "Muddy Water Blues" (Paul Rodgers)
  - Performed by Paul Rodgers
21. "Drinking" (Bôa)
  - Performed by Paul Rodgers, Steve Rodgers, and Jasmine Rodgers
22. "All Right Now" (Andy Fraser, Rodgers)
  - Performed by Paul Rodgers and Brian May
23. "Can't Get Enough" (Mick Ralphs)
  - Performed by Paul Rodgers and Joe Walsh
24. "Funk 49" (Jim Fox, Dale Peters, Joe Walsh)
25. "Life's Been Good" (Walsh)
26. "Life in the Fast Lane" (Glenn Frey, Don Henley, Walsh)
27. "Rocky Mountain Way" (Rocke Grace, Kenny Passarelli, Joe Vitale, Walsh)
  - Tracks 23–27 performed by Joe Walsh
28. "6PM" (Phil Manzanera)
  - Performed by Phil Manzanera
29. "Marooned" (David Gilmour, Richard Wright)
30. "Coming Back to Life" (Gilmour)
31. "Sorrow" (Gilmour)
  - Tracks 29–31 performed by David Gilmour and Phil Manzanera
32. "Ooh La La" (Ronnie Lane, Ronnie Wood)
  - Performed by Ronnie Wood
33. Stay with Me (Rod Stewart, Wood)
  - Performed by all except Hank and Ben Marvin

== Personnel ==
- Joe Walsh – guitar, vocals
- David Gilmour – guitar, vocals
- Brian May – guitar, vocals
- Paul Rodgers – guitar, vocals
- Ronnie Wood – guitar, vocals
- Hank Marvin – guitar, vocals
- The Crickets – guitar, vocals
- Albert Lee – guitar, vocals
- Gary Moore – guitar, vocals
- Mike Rutherford – guitar, vocals
- Paul Carrack – guitar, piano, vocals
- Phil Manzanera – guitar, vocals
- Amy Winehouse – guitar, vocals
- Jamie Cullum – keyboard, vocals
- Theresa Andersson – guitar, fiddle, vocals
- Andy Fairweather-Low – guitar, vocals
- Annie Clements – bass guitar
- Ben Marvin – guitar
- Cassandra Malaise – backing vocals

=== Support band ===
- Phil Palmer – guitar
- Pino Palladino – bass guitar
- Paul "Wix" Wickens – keyboards
- Ian Thomas – drums and percussion
- Cassandra Malaise – backing vocals
- Margo Buchanan – backing vocals
- Steve Balsamo – backing vocals
- Helen McRobbie – backing vocals

=== Venue ===
- Wembley Arena

== Certifications ==
Region	Certification	Certified units/sales
Australia (ARIA)	Platinum	15,000^{^}
^{^} Shipments figures based on certification alone.
