= Wilco Live: Ashes of American Flags =

Video by Wilco
- Released: April 18, 2009
- Recorded: February–March 2008
- Genre: Alternative rock
- Label: Nonesuch

Wilco chronology
Shake It Off (2007)	Wilco Live: Ashes of American Flags (2009)

Professional ratings
Review scores
Source	Rating
Chicago Reader	(favorable)

Wilco Live: Ashes of American Flags is a live performance DVD by the American alternative rock band Wilco.

The film was released exclusively to independent record stores through Nonesuch Records on April 18, 2009, in coordination with Record Store Day. The wide-scale release of the DVD was April 28, 2009. Ashes was assembled by longtime collaborators Brendan Canty and Christoph Green of Trixie Films, who previously worked on frontman Jeff Tweedy's solo DVD Sunken Treasure: Live in the Pacific Northwest. The live performances were recorded in February and March 2008 at Washington D.C.'s 9:30 Club, Nashville's Ryman Auditorium, Mobile's Mobile Civic Center, New Orleans' Tipitina's, and Tulsa's Cain's Ballroom.

The DVD also features a Weblink, which allows the owner to download MP3s of the all 20 tracks on the DVD.

== Track listing ==
1. "Ashes of American Flags" (from "Yankee Hotel Foxtrot")
2. "Side with the Seeds" (from "Sky Blue Sky")
3. "Handshake Drugs" (from "A Ghost is Born")
4. "The Late Greats" (from "A Ghost is Born")
5. "Kingpin" (from "Being There")
6. "Wishful Thinking" (from "A Ghost is Born")
7. "Impossible Germany" (from "Sky Blue Sky")
8. "Via Chicago" (from "Summerteeth")
9. "A Shot in the Arm" (from "Summerteeth")
10. "Monday" (from "Being There")
11. "You Are My Face" (from "Sky Blue Sky")
12. "Heavy Metal Drummer" (from "Yankee Hotel Foxtrot")
13. "War on War" (from "Yankee Hotel Foxtrot")

== Bonus tracks ==
1. "I'm the Man Who Loves You" (from "Yankee Hotel Foxtrot")
2. "Airline to Heaven" (from "Mermaid Avenue Vol. II")
3. "It's Just That Simple" (from "A.M.")
4. "At Least That's What You Said" (from "A Ghost is Born")
5. "I Am Trying to Break Your Heart" (from "Yankee Hotel Foxtrot")
6. "Theologians" (from "A Ghost is Born")
7. "Hate It Here" (from "Sky Blue Sky")
