= Annunciation (album) =

Studio album by the Subdudes
- Released: 1994
- Studio: Chez Flames
- Label: High Street
- Producer: The Subdudes, Keith Keller, Glyn Johns

The Subdudes chronology
Lucky (1991)	Annunciation (1994)	Primitive Streak (1996)

Annunciation is an album by the American band the Subdudes, released in 1994. The album title refers to Annunciation Street, in New Orleans; the album was originally intended to be released on Annunciation Day. Annunciation was the band's first album for High Street Records. The Subdudes supported the album with a North American tour. Annunciation sold more than 120,000 copies in its first eight months of release.

== Production ==
Annunciation's songs were written in a cabin in Colorado. It was recorded primarily at Chez Flames Recordings in New Orleans, produced by the band and Keith Keller. Glyn Johns had produced five of the songs for an earlier, aborted album. The band was chiefly inspired by gospel music; they also decided to make a mostly acoustic album. The title track describes being dropped by Atlantic Records. "Late at Night" was cowritten by members of the Iguanas. "Message Man" criticizes the music industry. "Angel to Be" is about the death of bassist Johnny Ray Allen's mother.

== Critical reception ==
Professional ratings
Review scores
Source	Rating
AllMusic	4/5 stars
Chicago Tribune	3.5/4 stars
The Indianapolis Star	4/4 stars
MusicHound Rock: The Essential Album Guide	4/5 stars
Orlando Sentinel	5/5 stars
Rolling Stone	3.5/5 stars
The Tampa Tribune	3.5/4 stars

The Chicago Tribune praised Tommy Malone's "soulful vocals and bluesy guitar work." The Orlando Sentinel determined that the Subdudes "custom-blend their R & B with rock, gospel, funk and Cajun/Creole influences from New Orleans." The Indianapolis Star called the music "a melodic mix of New Orleans blues and gospel and American pop, with a heavy emphasis on beat." The Pittsburgh Post-Gazette dismissed the album as "a lukewarm, white-bread retread of the Big Chill soundtrack."

The Colorado Springs Gazette-Telegraph deemed the album "a mixture of N'awlins funk, deep South blues and Colorado folk." Rolling Stone wrote that "this is New Orleans R&B at its most swinging, with touches of barroom blues, gospel-inspired harmonies, rock and country rhythms and, very simply, some fine playing." Stereo Review opined that "Malone sometimes comes across like Michael McDonald—a white guy trying too hard to sing the blues." The Boston Herald considered the music to be "folk-soul."

AllMusic wrote that "the music combines joy, melancholy, gospel fervor, and blues sincerity to create a unique and appealing sound."

== Track listing ==
No.	Title	Length
1.	"(You'll Be) Satisfied"
2.	"Why Can't I Forget About You"
3.	"Angel to Be"
4.	"I Know"
5.	"Late at Night"
6.	"Miss Love"
7.	"Poverty"
8.	"Message Man"
9.	"Save Me"
10.	"Fountains Flow"
11.	"Cold Nights"
12.	"Sugar Pie"
13.	"It's So Hard"
