= Snafu 10-31-'91 =

Live album by The Radiators
- Released: 1992
- Recorded: New Orleans, Louisiana
- Genre: Swamp rock
- Length: 67:58
- Label: Croaker Records

The Radiators chronology
Total Evaporation (1990)	Snafu 10-31-'91 (1992)	Bucket of Fish (1994)

Professional ratings
Review scores
Source	Rating
Allmusic	link

Snafu 10-31-'91 is the second live album by The Radiators, and their sixth album overall.

== Overview ==
After parting company with Epic Records, The Radiators returned to their own Croaker label in 1992 with their first live album in a decade. The album was recorded at a Halloween concert hosted by the New Orleans fan group, the Krewe of SNAFU. It was the first official release by the band to feature numerous covers of other artists, in addition to compositions by The Radiators' chief songwriter, Ed Volker.

== Track listing ==
1. "Got My Mojo Working" (Muddy Waters) — 6:22
2. "Let's Radiate" (Ed Volker) — 4:40
3. "Swamp Rat" (Volker) — 4:48
4. "The Twist" (Hank Ballard) — 2:59
5. "You Gotta Move" (Fred McDowell) — 4:47
6. "Up on Cripple Creek" (Robbie Robertson) — 7:38
7. "Down on the Corner" (John Fogerty) — 3:26
8. "No Expectations" (Mick Jagger, Keith Richards) — 7:20
9. "Crossroads" (Robert Johnson) — 6:06
10. "Outlaw Blues" (Bob Dylan) — 5:43
11. "Crawfish Head" (Volker) — 1:45
12. "All Meat" (Volker) — 5:52
13. "Automatic" (Volker) -6:32

== Credits ==
- Ed Volker – percussion, keyboards, vocals
- Dave Malone – guitars, vocals
- Camile Baudoin – guitars, vocals
- Reggie Scanlan – bass
- Frank Bua – drums
- Glenn Sears – percussion
- The Radiators – producer
