= The Tiki Bar Is Open =

The Tiki Bar is Open

Studio album by John Hiatt
- Released: September 11, 2001
- Genre: Rock
- Length: 44:55
- Label: Vanguard
- Producer: Jay Joyce

John Hiatt chronology
Crossing Muddy Waters (2000)	The Tiki Bar is Open (2001)	Beneath This Gruff Exterior (2003)

Singles from The Tiki Bar is Open
- 1. "My Old Friend" Released: 2001; 2. "I'll Never Get Over You" Released: March 27, 2002

The Tiki Bar is Open is singer-songwriter John Hiatt's fifteenth album, released in 2001. It was his last album with Vanguard Records. Although they are uncredited, the album features backing band the Goners, the same cadre of friends who backed Hiatt in his 1988 release, Slow Turning. (CD Version does credit the Goners: Dave Ranson, Kenneth Blevins, and Sonny Landreth) "All the Lilacs in Ohio" was eventually rerecorded for Hiatt's collaboration album with the Jerry Douglas Band, Leftover Feelings.

== Background and release ==
Hiatt and the Goners recorded most of the album before Crossing Muddy Waters, and it was originally going to be released by Capitol. However, in January 2000, Hiatt got out of his contract with Capitol, and The Tiki Bar is Open was eventually finished and released by Vanguard.

The Tiki Bar is Open was released by Vanguard on September 11, 2001. The album debuted, and peaked at No. 89 on the Billboard 200 chart. "My Old Friend" and "I'll Never Get Over You" were released as singles.

== Critical reception ==
Professional ratings
Review scores
Source	Rating
AllMusic	3.5/5 stars
The Austin Chronicle	4/4 stars
Daily Vault	A−
The Michigan Daily	B−
The New Rolling Stone Album Guide	3/5 stars

AllMusic's Hal Horowitz wrote "Far from winding down in his fifties, John Hiatt released the most inspired work of his life. Not quite as magical as his high-water mark, Bring the Family, this is still a superbly crafted disc whose songs quickly sink in and stay lodged in your brain." Gina Pensiero of The Michigan Daily writes that "All the songs on The Tiki Bar is Open have substantial potential, but their presentations are mediocre and clich. One exception to this rule is "Hangin Round Here," which is catchy and Randy Newman-esque. Another is the upbeat and pop-driven "All the Lilacs in Ohio." PopMatters writes "The Tiki Bar Is Open is such a departure from last year’s all-acoustic Crossing Muddy Waters that it may come as a bit of a shock to complacent Hiatt fans. It has more in common spiritually with Perfectly Good Guitar than even Slow Turning, because it rocks hard where Slow Turning casually rolled. It’s as if Hiatt is not quite ready to become a full-time blues singer, or a straight-ahead folk rocker, like many would expect him to. The tiki torch still shines." John Hood of Music Row says that the album "solidifies Hiatt's reputation as one of America's most enduring and important songwriters."

== Track listing ==
All tracks are written by John Hiatt.

No.	Title	Length
1.	"Everybody Went Low"	3:20
2.	"Hangin' Round Here"	3:09
3.	"All the Lilacs in Ohio"	3:37
4.	"My Old Friend"	3:50
5.	"I Know a Place"	3:26
6.	"Something Broken"	3:12
7.	"Rock of Your Love"	3:15
8.	"I'll Never Get Over You"	3:38
9.	"The Tiki Bar Is Open"	4:40
10.	"Come Home to You"	3:52
11.	"Farther Stars"	8:49
Total length:		44:55

== Personnel ==
- John Hiatt – guitar, piano, harmonica, mandolin, harmonium, vocals
- Jay Joyce – guitar, keyboards, loops
- Sonny Landreth – guitar
- Dave Ranson – bass
- Kenneth Blevins – drums, percussion
- David Bianco – piano on "The Tiki Bar Is Open"
- Julie Miller – backing vocals
- New Reflections Men's Choir – backing vocals on "The Tiki Bar Is Open"
