= Theresa Andersson =

American singer

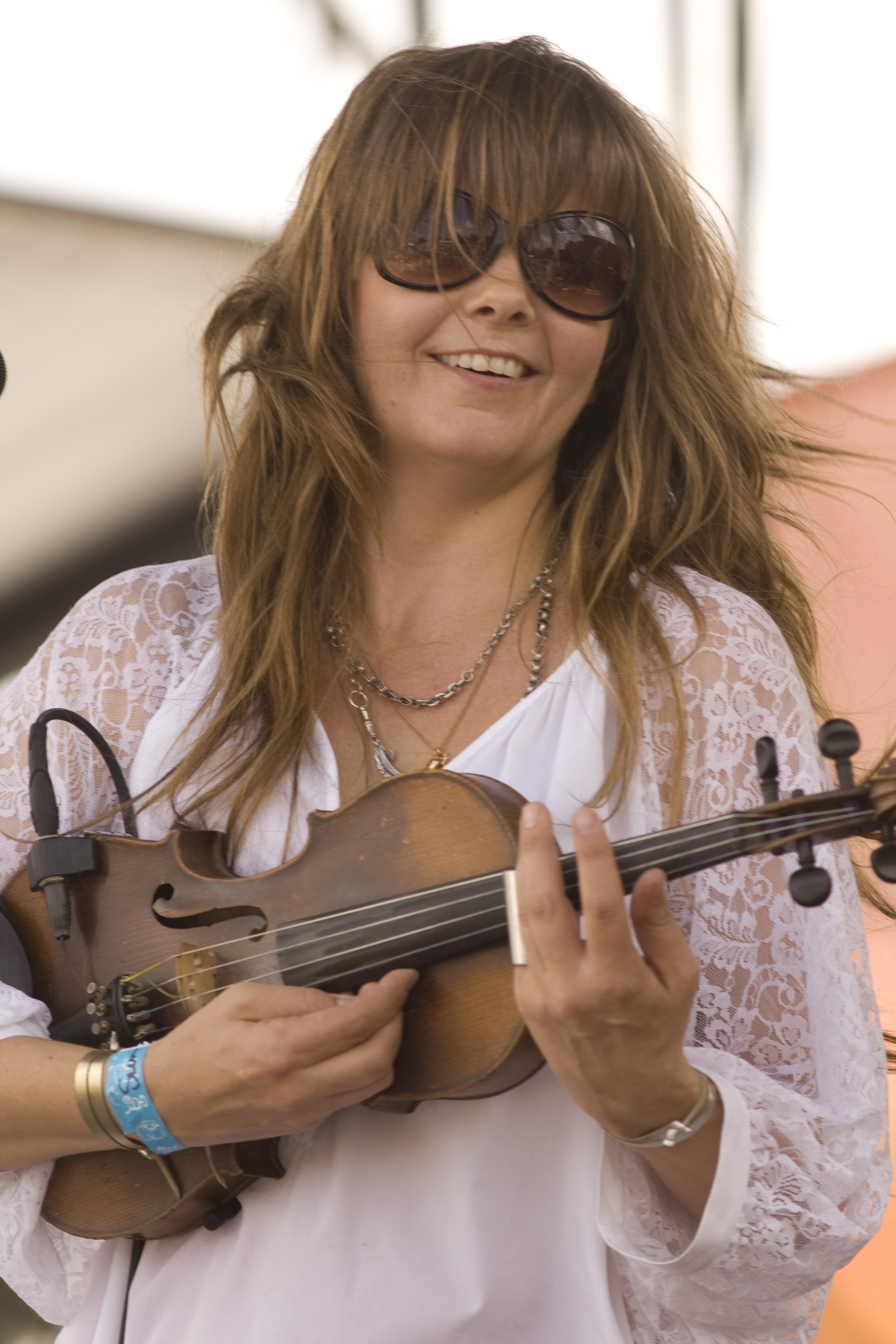
- Theresa Andersson at French Quarter Festival, 2012

Background information
- Born: 11 September 1971 (age 54); Gotland, Sweden
- Genres: Soul
- Occupation: Musician
- Years active: 1990–present
- Label: Basin Street
- Website: www.theresaandersson.com

Theresa Andersson (born 11 September 1971) is a Swedish singer-songwriter and multi-instrumentalist, based in Shreveport, Louisiana.

== History ==
=== General ===
Born in Slite on the Swedish island of Gotland, Andersson went to New Orleans in 1990 to play violin with fellow singer-songwriter and Swede, Anders Osborne. She remained and has since then performed and recorded with several well-known New Orleans musicians, including Allen Toussaint, The Neville Brothers, The Meters and Betty Harris. In 2007, she accepted an invitation to participate in Goin' Home: A Tribute to Fats Domino, where she performed "When The Saints Go Marching In" with The Preservation Hall Jazz Band. Andersson has performed on Late Night with Conan O'Brien and The Late Late Show with Craig Ferguson and has been a performer at the Voodoo Festival in New Orleans.

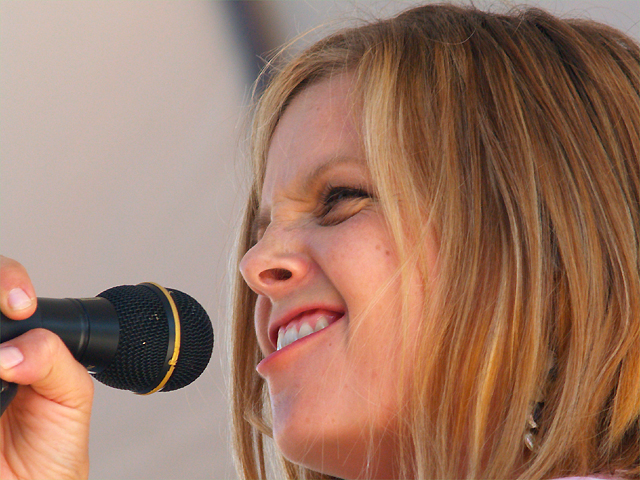
Andersson in 2006

=== One-woman show ===
Inspired by a one-man-puppet-show (Blair Thomas, Chicago), in which the puppeteer played multiple characters and the drums, Andersson overcame the financial impracticality of touring Europe with a band by learning to play with a loop pedal. She began by looping just her violin, voice, and guitar. Wanting to create a richer sound live, however, she began thinking about adding another loop pedal and more instruments. As a result, Andersson currently travels with two loop pedals, which she uses simultaneously, along with her record player, drums, dulcimer, guitar, and violin.

== Recording specifics ==
=== Hummingbird, Go! ===
Andersson's idea for her most recent Basin Street Records release was borne while touring Sweden, when she met with producer Tobias Froberg. With little prodding, like-minded Tobias flew to New Orleans in the fall of 2007, where the two recorded Hummingbird, Go! in Andersson's kitchen. Andersson played most of the instruments on the album, with exception on two duets: one with New Orleans producer Allen Toussaint, and the other with Norwegian Singer Ane Brun. The album was mixed by Linus Larsson (Peter, Bjorn and John, Mercury Rev).

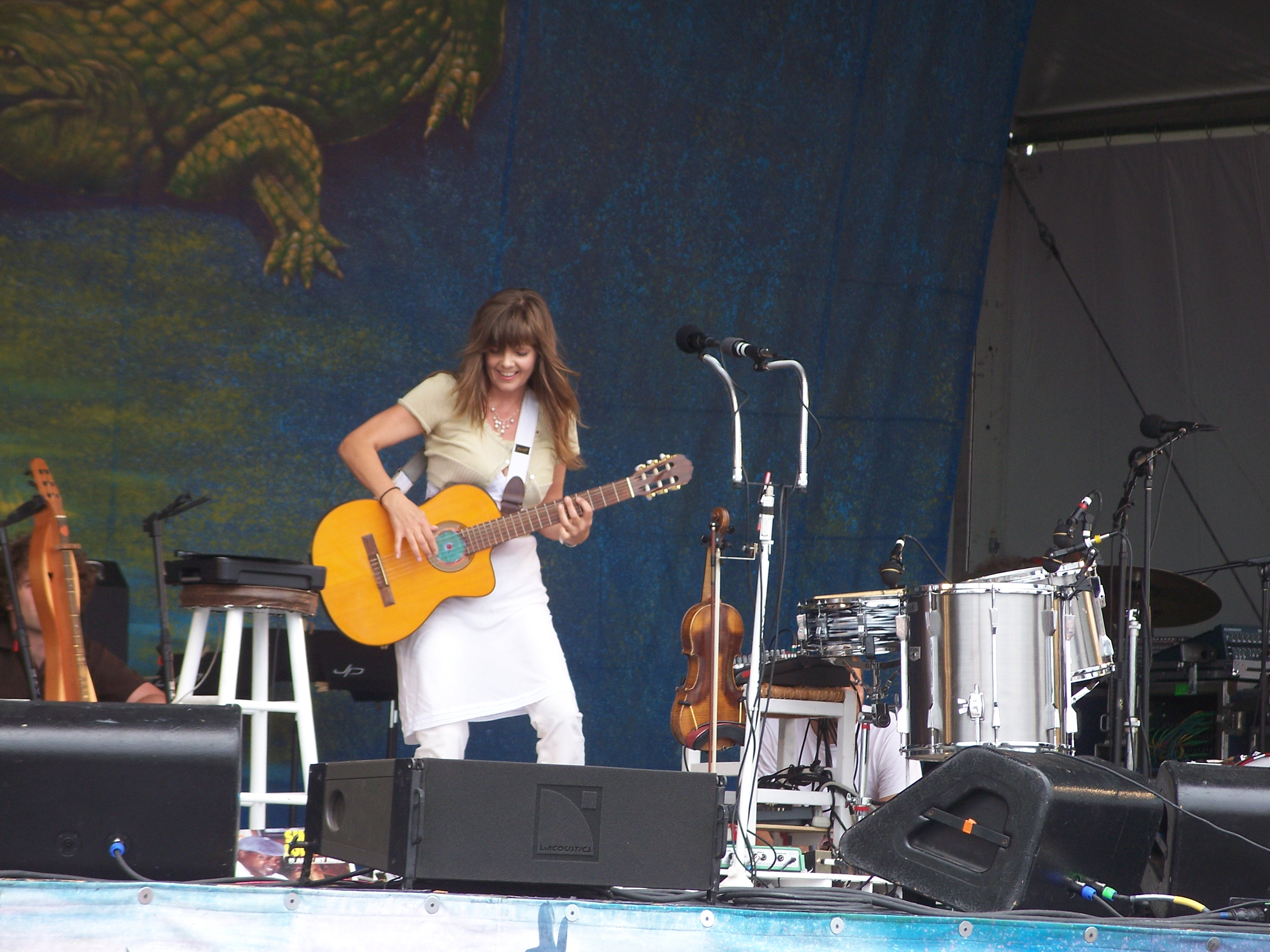
Theresa Andersson performs at the New Orleans Jazz & Heritage Festival, April 2009.

=== Theresa Andersson Live at Le Petit ===
In April 2010, Theresa released her first live DVD entitled Theresa Andersson Live at Le Petit. Andersson's performance at New Orleans’ Le Petit Theatre du Vieux Carre on 28 Feb was recorded for the DVD. Live at Le Petit contains an extended set of old and new music, including some exclusive, never-before-seen material. In addition to her original music, the DVD features Andersson's renditions of traditional American folk songs as well as a duet with famed New Orleans music legend Allen Toussaint.

== Online success ==
Andersson's do-it-yourself video for her song "Na Na Na" has become very popular on YouTube, with over 1.2 million views. Originally shot as a promotional video to help music venues understand how she would be touring, the video went viral during the summer of 2008. Andersson filmed the video, and a second one for her song, "Birds Fly Away" in the same kitchen where she recorded her album Hummingbird, Go!

== Personal life ==
Andersson is married, with one child born 2011. She skipped the 2011 New Orleans Jazz Fest because hormonal changes associated with delivery of her first child temporarily rendered her upper vocal register unsteady. Andersson and her family live in Shreveport.

== Discography ==
=== Solo ===
- Vibes (3 June 1996)
- Theresa Andersson (30 April 2000)
- No Regrets (19 April 2002)
- Shine (10 March 2004)
- Theresa Andersson The EP (20 May 2006)
- I the River EP (11 June 2008)
- Hummingbird, Go! (2 September 2008)
- Street Parade (24 April 2012)

=== Compilations ===
- Peace Stories by Theresa Anderson, John Fohl, David Doucet – (2001)
- A Love Song for Bobby Long by Various Artists – Soundtracks – (2005)
- When The Saints Go Marching In by Preservation Hall Jazz Band, on Goin' Home: A Tribute to Fats Domino – (2007)
- "Ladies In Blue" by David Byrne and Fatboy Slim, on Here Lies Love – (2010)

== Filmography ==
- The Strat Pack: Live in Concert (2004)
- A Love Song for Bobby Long (2004)
- The Brooke Ellison Story (2004)
- Infidelity (2004)
- Earth vs. The Radiators: The First 25 (2004)
- New Orleans Music in Exile (2006)
- Theresa Andersson Live at Le Petit (2010)
