= Law of the Fish =

Studio album by the Radiators
- Released: 1987
- Recorded: Southlake, New Orleans, Louisiana
- Genre: Swamp rock
- Length: 46:00
- Label: Epic
- Producer: Rodney Mills

The Radiators chronology
Heat Generation (1981)	Law of the Fish (1987)	Zig-Zaggin' Through Ghostland (1989)

Professional ratings
Review scores
Source	Rating
AllMusic	4.5/5 stars

Law of the Fish is the third album by the Radiators. It is their second studio album and their first major label release.

== Overview ==
After a five-year hiatus from record-making (but not from performing), the Radiators signed with Epic Records and released their first major label album, which helped introduce their self-described "fishhead music" to a national audience. The album made it up to No. 139 on the Billboard 200, and the songs "Doctor, Doctor" and "Like Dreamers Do" made it to No. 20 and No. 23 respectively on the Mainstream Rock Tracks.

The songs on the album were written over a period of several years, with the oldest, "Suck the Head", bearing a 1979 copyright date. Only two of the songs, "Oh Beautiful Loser" and "Sparkplug" actually have a 1987 copyright date.

== Track listing ==
All tracks are written by Ed Volker, unless otherwise noted.

Side one
No.	Title	Writer(s)	Length
1.	"This Wagon's Gonna Roll"		4:20
2.	"Like Dreamers Do"		4:04
3.	"Doctor, Doctor"	Ed Volker; Dave Malone; Camile Baudoin; Frank Bua Jr.; Reggie Scanlan; Glenn Sears	4:05
4.	"Oh Beautiful Loser"		4:12
5.	"Suck the Head"	Ed Volker; Camile Baudoin	3:14
6.	"Mood to Move"		3:59

Side two
No.	Title	Writer(s)	Length
1.	"Sparkplug"		3:01
2.	"Holiday"		4:01
3.	"Love Is a Tangle"		4:10
4.	"Boomerang"		4:20
5.	"Hard Time Train"		5:35
6.	"Law of the Fish"	Ed Volker; Dave Malone; Camile Baudoin; Frank Bua Jr.; Reggie Scanlan; Glenn Sears	0:59
Total length:			46:00

== Credits ==
- Ed Volker – keyboards, vocals
- Dave Malone – guitars, vocals
- Camile Baudoin – guitars, vocals
- Reggie Scanlan – bass
- Frank Bua Jr. – drums
- Glenn Sears – percussion
- Rodney Mills – producer, engineer
- Tag George – second engineer
