= Heat Generation =

Studio album by the Radiators
- Released: 1981
- Recorded: Ultrasonic, New Orleans, Louisiana
- Genre: Swamp rock
- Length: 38:31
- Label: Croaker
- Producer: Bill Cat, the Radiators

The Radiators chronology
Work Done on Premises (1980)	Heat Generation (1981)	Law of the Fish (1987)

Professional ratings
Review scores
Source	Rating
AllMusic	2/5 stars

Heat Generation is the second album and first studio album from the Radiators.

== Overview ==
Four years after they formed and a year after their first album, the Radiators entered a studio for the first time to create Heat Generation. It flopped and they gave up making albums for five years, until they signed with Epic Records.

== Track listing ==
All tracks are written by Ed Volker, who collaborated on the title track.

No.	Title	Writer(s)	Length
1.	"Jigsaw"		4:50
2.	"Cocktail Music"		3:57
3.	"Automatic"		3:58
4.	"Smokin' Hole"		4:07
5.	"Heat Generation"	Ed Volker; Camile Baudoin; Frank Bua Jr.; Dave Malone; Reggie Scanlan	1:53
6.	"Nail Your Heart to Mine"		4:40
7.	"Sunglasses On"		2:30
8.	"Shoot Out the Lights"		3:38
9.	"Gimme a Rainbow That's for Real"		5:13
10.	"Monkey in Her Heart"		3:45
Total length:			38:31

2007 reissue bonus tracks
No.	Title	Length
11.	"If Your Heart Ain't in It"	2:45
12.	"Hard to Tell"	3:21
Total length:		44:37

== Credits ==
- Camile Baudoin — Guitars and Vocals
- Dave Malone — Guitars and Vocals
- Frank Bua — Drums and percussion
- Reggie Scanlan — bass and cowbell
- Ed Volker — keyboards, Vocals and Percussion
- Bill Cat — producer
- The Radiators — Producer
