= Last of the Good Straight Girls =

Studio album by Susan Werner
- Released: March 28, 1995
- Recorded: October 1994
- Genre: Contemporary folk
- Length: 48:23
- Label: Private Music/BMG
- Producer: Fernando Saunders

Susan Werner chronology
Live at Tin Angel (1993)	Last of the Good Straight Girls (1995)	Time Between Trains (1998)

Professional ratings
Review scores
Source	Rating
Allmusic	(3/5)

Last of the Good Straight Girls is the third album by American singer-songwriter Susan Werner, released in 1995 (see 1995 in music). This was Werner's first major label album.

== Track listing ==
All songs written by Susan Werner, except where noted

1. "Last of the Good Straight Girls" – 3:43
2. "Still Believe" – 5:19
3. "Man I Used to Love" – 4:09
4. "St. Mary's of Regret" – 4:09
5. "No One Here but Me" (Fernando Saunders, Werner) – 4:16
6. "Through the Glass" (Saunders, Werner) – 4:40
7. "Some Other Town" (Saunders, Werner) – 4:07
8. "Yes to You (Tappan Zee)" – 4:08
9. "Something So Right" (Paul Simon) – 5:25
10. "Signing Your Name" – 5:13
11. "Much at All" – 3:14

== Personnel ==
- Susan Werner – vocals
- Marshall Crenshaw – electric guitar
- Mitchell Froom – keyboards
- Zachary Richard

== Production ==
- Producer: Fernando Saunders
- Assistant engineer: Jodie Zalewski
