= Tiny Town (band) =

Tiny Town was a New Orleans rock-blues band formed in 1997. The band was formed by singer Pat McLaughlin, with guitarists Tommy Malone and Johnny-Ray Allen, both of The Subdudes, and drummer Kenny Blevins. Malone returned to work with the Subdudes.

== Album ==
The group recorded only one album, Tiny Town, in 1998. The song "Follow You Home" from the self-named debut album was featured on NBC's "Homicide.".
