= Midwestern Saturday Night =

Studio album by Susan Werner
- Released: 1993
- Genre: Contemporary folk
- Length: 38:57
- Label: Susan Werner
- Producer: Grant MacAvoy

Susan Werner chronology
Midwestern Saturday Night (1993)	Live at Tin Angel (1993)

Professional ratings
Review scores
Source	Rating
Allmusic	3/5 stars

Midwestern Saturday Night is the self-published debut album by American singer-songwriter Susan Werner, released in 1993 (see 1993 in music).

== Track listing ==
All songs written by Susan Werner, except where noted

1. "So Heavy" – 3:35
2. "Born a Little Late (The Baby Boomer Song)" – 2:55
3. "Midwestern Saturday Night" – 5:21
4. "I Still Believe" – 5:21
5. "Rubber Glove Blues" – 2:44
6. "Lullabye for One" – 4:09
7. "Uncle John" – 2:32
8. "The Great Out There" (Greg Simon) – 3:42
9. "Maybe If I Played Cole Porter" – 4:37
10. "Shadow Dancing" – 4:01

== Personnel ==
- Susan Werner – guitar, piano, keyboard, vocals, background vocals
- Paul Gehman – upright and electric bass
- Lou Abbott – percussion
- Julia Haines – Celtic harp
- Erik Johnson – drums

== Production ==
- Producer: Grant MacAvoy
- Engineer: Glenn Barratt
- Arrangers: Lou Abbott, Susan Werner
