= Primitive Streak (album) =

Studio album by the Subdudes
- Released: 1996
- Label: High Street/Windham Hill
- Producer: Clark Vreeland

The Subdudes chronology
Annunciation (1994)	Primitive Streak (1996)	Live at Last (1997)

Primitive Streak is an album by the American band the Subdudes, released in 1996. It was a success on Americana album charts. The band supported the album with a North American tour, which included shows with Anders Osborne.

== Production ==
The album was produced by Clark Vreeland; it was the first time the band was allowed to choose their producer. Willie Williams joined the band prior the recording sessions. The album was written in Colorado and recorded in New Orleans.

Two of Primitive Streak's songs were cowritten with Pat McLaughlin. Bonnie Raitt played guitar and sang on "Too Soon to Tell".

== Critical reception ==
Professional ratings
Review scores
Source	Rating
AllMusic	3/5 stars
The Encyclopedia of Popular Music	3/5 stars
The Indianapolis Star	3/4 stars
Knoxville News Sentinel	B
MusicHound Rock: The Essential Album Guide	3.5/5 stars

The Washington Post wrote that "the Subdudes have fashioned a fascinating blend of Southern California soft-rock, New Orleans R&B and South Louisiana swamp pop." The Milwaukee Journal Sentinel determined that "the band's signature sound comes from the blend of Tommy Malone's greasy slide guitar and soulful vocals, John Magnie's plaintive accordion and the imposing thunder of Steve Amedee on drums."

The Knoxville News Sentinel lamented that "many songs feature weak lyrics—something you hardly notice when the band's onstage, but it stands out on disc." The Philadelphia Inquirer noted that "there are updates of vintage R&B—'Why Do You Hurt Me So' recalls Professor Longhair's rumba-boogie—as well as conventional rockers and uncharacteristically brooding pieces." The Indianapolis Star deemed the album "bayou lite music: all the flavor of roots rock, country, R&B and zydeco, with little of the grit."

AllMusic wrote: "Full of New Orleans-style funkiness, Primitive Streak by the Subdudes builds well of the foundation laid out on their last release."

== Track listing ==
No.	Title	Length
1.	"All the Time in the World"
2.	"Carved in Stone"
3.	"Break Down These Walls"
4.	"Why Do You Hurt Me So"
5.	"Faraway Girl"
6.	"Love Somebody"
7.	"Lonely Soldier"
8.	"Too Soon to Tell"
9.	"Do Me a Favor"
10.	"She"
11.	"Don't Let 'Em"
12.	"Sarita"
13.	"Love o' Love"
