= Live at Tin Angel =

Live album by Susan Werner
- Released: November 11, 1993
- Recorded: June 11, 1990 – October 8, 1993 at The Tin Angel in Philadelphia, Pennsylvania
- Genre: Contemporary Folk
- Length: 50:14
- Label: Susan Werner

Susan Werner chronology
Midwestern Saturday Night (1993)	Live at Tin Angel (1993)	Last of the Good Straight Girls (1995)

Professional ratings
Review scores
Source	Rating
Knight Ridder News Service	2.5/5 stars

Live at Tin Angel is the second self-published album by American singer-songwriter Susan Werner, released in 1993.

== Track listing ==
All songs written by Susan Werner, except where noted

1. "So Heavy" – 3:41
2. "The Great Out There" (Greg Simon) – 4:21
3. "Still Believe" – 5:28
4. "Last of the Good Straight Girls" – 2:58
5. "Snow White" – 3:23
6. "My Mother's Garden" – 4:21
7. "Shackamaxon Street" – 3:34
8. "Intro: Attend the Sky" – 0:35
9. "Attend the Sky" – 3:52
10. "Soul's Not at War" – 4:27
11. "Maybe If I Sang Cole Porter" – 4:04
12. "Society Ball (Just the Band)" – 1:55
13. "La Vie en Rose" (Mack David, Marcel Louiguy, Edith Piaf) – 2:50
14. "Intro: Ain't I Lonely" – 0:54
15. "Ain't I Lonely Tonight" – 3:51

== Personnel ==
- Susan Werner – vocals, acoustic guitar, piano, keyboard

== Production ==
- Engineer: George Pierson
- Mastering: Glenn Barratt
- Cover design: Susan Werner
