= Behind the Levee =

Studio album by The Subdudes
- Released: January 24, 2006
- Recorded: May 2005
- Genre: Americana, swamp rock, roots rock, Southern rock, New Orleans R&B, Cajun/zydeco, country soul
- Label: Back Porch
- Producer: Keb'Mo

The Subdudes chronology
Miracle Mule (2004)	Behind the Levee (2006)	Street Symphony (2007)

Behind the Levee is the sixth studio album by The Subdudes, released in 2006. As usual for the band their music combines rock, folk, R&B, soul, funk, gospel, blues, Cajun and zydeco. The album was produced by the noted blues musician Keb'Mo and features as special guest stars The Dirty Dozen Brass Band horns on two tracks and Rosie Ledet in duet vocal with Tommy Malone on one track.

== Reception ==
Professional ratings
Review scores
Source	Rating
Allmusic	3.5/5 stars

The Allmusic review by Adam Greenberg awarded the album 3½ stars, saying, "This is basic New Orleans funky, bluesy rock & roll.... There's probably not anything new here stylistically, but that's really the key. The music is simultaneously fresh and nostalgic, conserved but energetic. It's not an adventurous sound the band is after here, but it's a terrific album full of fundamentals with quality performances all around."

== Track listing ==
1. "Papa Dukie and the Mud People" (Steve Amedée, Tim Cook, John Magnie, Tommy Malone) – 4:10
2. "Next to Me" (Magnie, Malone) – 4:17
3. "No Vacancy" (Magnie, Malone) – 2:28
4. "One World (Peace)" (Magnie, Malone) – 3:25
5. "Social Aid and Pleasure Club" (Kevin Moore) – 3:27
6. "Time for the Sun to Rise" (Earl King) – 6:11
7. "Let's Play" (Amedée, Cook, Magnie, Malone) – 3:38
8. "Looking at You" (Amedée, Cook, Magnie, Malone) – 4:16
9. "Keep My Feet Upon the Ground" (Malone) – 4:05
10. "Prayer of Love" (Amedée) – 4:19

== Personnel ==
- Tommy Malone – guitars, lead vocals
- John Magnie – accordion, organ, piano, lead vocal on (5)
- Steve Amedee – percussion, tambourine, lead vocal on (10)
- Jimmy Messa - bass guitar, rhythm guitar on (1, 3, 5, 7, 8)
- Tim Cook – bass guitar, percussion, backing vocals
- Phil Chandler – organ on (2,4)
- Rosie Ledet – duet vocal on (8)
- The Dirty Dozen Brass Band – horn section (credited as Efrem Towns, Roger Lewis, Kevin Harris, and Revert Andrews) on (1,5)
- Connie Gage – creative director
- Sammy Holbrook – assistant
- Mark Johnson – audio engineer
- Keb' Mo' – audio production
- Stephen Marsh – mastering
- Rick Spain – design, illustrations
