= Total Evaporation =

Studio album by the Radiators
- Released: 1991
- Genre: Swamp rock, roots rock
- Label: Epic
- Producer: Jim Dickinson

The Radiators chronology
Zig-Zaggin' Through Ghostland (1989)	Total Evaporation (1991)	Snafu 10-31-'91 (1992)

Total Evaporation is the fifth album by the Radiators, released in 1991. The band and label parted ways before the year was over. Total Evaporation sold more than 85,000 copies in its first six months of release.

"Let the Red Wine Flow" was the first single. The band supported the album with a North American tour.

== Production ==
Recorded in Memphis, the album was produced by Jim Dickinson. Most of the songs were written by Ed Volker; he thought that the album incorporated a more pronounced soul influence. The Memphis Horns played on a few tracks.

== Critical reception ==
Professional ratings
Review scores
Source	Rating
AllMusic	3/5 stars
Calgary Herald	B+
Chicago Tribune	2.5/4 stars
Orlando Sentinel	4/5 stars
The Rolling Stone Album Guide	3.5/5 stars

USA Today praised the "funk-bitten Mardi Gras stomp." The Chicago Tribune wrote that "the band has yet to kick the homily habit or its reliance on funky rock retreads straight out of Little Feat and the Neville Brothers." The Waterloo Region Record opined that, "as a kind of roots-rock with country tinges, this album has too many competitors to make it worthwhile." The Houston Chronicle deemed the Radiators a "quintessential bar band," writing that the majority of the album was the "usual funky-blues flow." The Oregonian noted that the "relaxed arrangements ... avoid the beer-commercial-boogie cliches."

== Track listing ==
1. "Soul Deep" (Ed Volker) — 4:34
2. "Let the Red Wine Flow" (Volker, Dave Malone, Camile Baudoin) — 4:53
3. "Total Evaporation" (Volker, Malone, Baudoin, Reggie Scanlan) — 5:33
4. "Grain of Salt" (Volker) — 3:46
5. "Molasses" (Malone, Volker) — 3:43
6. "Solid Ground" (Volker) — 6:03
7. "Never Let Your Fire Go Out" (Malone, Baudoin, Scanlan, Frank Bua) — 3:40
8. "Everything Gets in the Way" (Volker) — 4:02
9. "You Can't Take It with You" (Malone, Baudoin, Scanlan, Bua) — 5:06
10. "Good as Gone" (Volker) — 4:31
11. "Party 'Til the Money Runs Out" (Volker) — 2:09
12. "Honey from the Bee" (Volker) — 3:58
13. "I Want to Go Where the Green Arrow Goes" (Volker) — 5:25

== Personnel ==
- Ed Volker – keyboards, vocals
- Dave Malone – guitars, vocals
- Camile Baudoin – guitars, vocals
- Reggie Scanlan – bass
- Frank Bua Jr. – drums
- Glenn Sears – percussion
- Jim Dickinson – producer
- East Memphis Slim – Hammond organ
- Wayne Jackson – trombone, trumpet
- Andrew Love – tenor saxophone
- The Memphis Horns
- Jay Mark – engineer
