= Zig-Zaggin' Through Ghostland =

1989 studio album by the Radiators

Studio album by the Radiators
- Released: 1989
- Genre: Swamp rock
- Length: 51:47
- Label: Epic
- Producer: Rodney Mills

The Radiators chronology
Law of the Fish (1987)	Zig-Zaggin' Through Ghostland (1989)	Total Evaporation (1990)

Professional ratings
Review scores
Source	Rating
AllMusic	3/5 stars

Zig-Zaggin' Through Ghostland is the fourth album by the Radiators, and their third studio album.

== Overview ==
After the moderate success of their major label debut, Law of the Fish, the Radiators returned to the studio to create Zig-Zaggin' Through Ghostland. Described as "slightly more aggressive" than its predecessor by AllMusic, the album was also slightly more successful, peaking at No. 122 on the Billboard 200. The song "Confidential" made it all the way to No. 8 on the Mainstream Rock Tracks.

== Track listing ==
All tracks are written by Ed Volker, unless otherwise noted.

No.	Title	Writer(s)	Length
1.	"Confidential"		4:13
2.	"Zigzaggin' Through Ghostland"		3:42
3.	"Fall of Dark"		4:56
4.	"Squeeze Me"		3:38
5.	"Love Grows on Ya"		3:56
6.	"Dedicated to You"		3:35
7.	"But It's Alright"	J. J. Jackson; Pierre Tubbs	2:58
8.	"Memories of Venus"		3:49
9.	"Red Dress"	Ed Volker; Dave Malone	3:35
10.	"Raw Nerve"	Ed Volker; Dave Malone	3:01
11.	"I Want to Live"		3:31
12.	"Hardcore"	Ed Volker; Dave Malone; Camile Baudoin; Frank Bua Jr.; Reggie Scanlan; Glenn Sears	6:45
13.	"Meet Me Down in Birdland"		4:08
Total length:			51:47

== Credits ==
- Ed Volker – keyboards, vocals
- Dave Malone – guitars, vocals
- Camile Baudoin – guitars, vocals
- Reggie Scanlan – bass
- Frank Bua Jr. – drums
- Glenn Sears – percussion
- Rodney Mills – producer, engineer
