= Time Between Trains =

Studio album by Susan Werner
- Released: September 15, 1998
- Genre: Contemporary Folk
- Length: 42:48
- Label: Bottom Line
- Producer: Darrell Scott

Susan Werner chronology
Last of the Good Straight Girls (1995)	Time Between Trains (1998)	New Non-Fiction (2001)

Professional ratings
Review scores
Source	Rating
Allmusic	4/5 stars

Time Between Trains is the 4th album by American singer-songwriter Susan Werner, released in 1998 (see 1998 in music).

== Track listing ==
all songs written by Susan Werner, except where noted

1. "Time Between Trains" – 3:49
2. "Old Mistake" – 4:26
3. "Bring 'Round the Boat" – 3:36
4. "Sorry About Jesus" – 3:09
5. "Petaluma Afternoons" – 3:52
6. "Courting the Muse" – 3:30
7. "Montgomery Street" – 4:59
8. "Like Bonsai" (Greg Simon, Werner) – 4:07
9. "Can't Let You In" (Mike Sumler, Werner) – 3:44
10. "Standing in My Own Way" (Dana Cooper) – 3:57
11. "Vincent" (Don McLean) – 3:39
12. "Movie of My Life" (hidden track)

== Personnel ==
- Susan Werner – guitar, piano, vocals, vibraphone
- Gary Buho Gazaway – trumpet
- Steve Khan – accordion, Hammond organ
- Viktor Krauss – acoustic bass
- Hunter Lee – bagpipes
- Kenny Malone – percussion, drums
- Hank Medress – hands, palmas
- Greg Morrow – drums
- Jelly Roll Morton – harmonica
- Michael Rhodes – electric bass
- Tom Roady – percussion
- Bill Schleicher – whistle
- Darrell Scott – bouzouki, dobro, guitar, mandolin, electric guitar, keyboard, background vocals, resonator guitar
- Antoine Silverman – violin

== Production ==
- Producer: Darrell Scott
- Executive producer: Hank Medress
- Associate producer: Miles Wilkinson
- Engineer: Miles Wilkinson
- Second engineer: Rob MacMillan
- Mixing: Miles Wilkinson
- Mastering: Peter Moore
- Photography: Jay Strauss
