= New Non-Fiction =

Studio album by Susan Werner
- Released: November 29, 2001
- Genre: Contemporary Folk
- Length: 42:15
- Label: Susan Werner
- Producer: Colin Linden

Susan Werner chronology
Time Between Trains (1998)	New Non-Fiction (2001)	I Can't Be New (2004)

New Non-Fiction is the fifth album by American singer-songwriter Susan Werner, released in 2001.

== Track listing ==
All songs written by Susan Werner, except where noted

1. "Stationary" – 3:16
2. "Shade of Grey" – 3:50
3. "Blue Guitar" – 2:55
4. "Yellow House" – 2:14
5. "(It's OK To) Feel Good" – 3:55
6. "All of the Above" – 3:41
7. "Everybody's Talkin'" (Fred Neil) – 4:06
8. "Misery and Happiness" – 4:44
9. "Barbed Wire Boys" – 3:20
10. "Big Car" – 3:08
11. "Nefertiti's Dream" – 3:38
12. "Epilogue: May I Suggest" – 3:28

== Personnel ==
- Susan Werner – acoustic guitar, vocals, background vocals, Wurlitzer
- Richard Bell – Hammond organ, Wurlitzer
- Kenneth Blevins – drums
- Byron House – bass
- Colin Linden – acoustic guitar, dobro, electric guitar, baritone guitar
- Jon Randall – background vocals
- David Roe – gut string guitar
- Tammy Rogers – mandolin

== Production ==
- Producer: Colin Linden
- Engineer: Susan Werner, John Whynot
- Mixing: John Whynot
- Mixing assistant: Chad Brown
- Mastering: John Whynot
- Instrumentation: Colin Linden
- Art direction: Steve Cook
- Design: Steve Cook
- Photography: Lauren Lyons
