= Beneath This Gruff Exterior =

Studio album by John Hiatt & the Goners
- Released: May 6, 2003
- Studio: Blackbird, Berry Hill, Tennessee
- Genre: Rock
- Length: 50:00
- Label: New West
- Producer: Don Smith, John Hiatt, the Goners

John Hiatt & the Goners chronology
The Tiki Bar is Open (2001)	Beneath This Gruff Exterior (2003)	Master of Disaster (2005)

Beneath This Gruff Exterior is singer-songwriter John Hiatt's sixteenth album, released in 2003. It was his first album with New West Records, and it was also the only album on which backing band the Goners received front cover credit along with Hiatt (although the Goners had previously backed Hiatt on 1988's Slow Turning and 2001's The Tiki Bar Is Open). "The Most Unoriginal Sin" was first recorded by Willie Nelson on his album Across the Borderline.

== Recording and release ==
Beneath This Gruff Exterior was recorded live at the Blackbird Studios in Berry Hill, Tennessee. It was produced jointly by Don Smith and John Hiatt and the Goners.

Beneath This Gruff Exterior was released by New West on May 6, 2003. The album debuted, and peaked at No. 73 on the Billboard 200 chart.

== Critical reception ==
Professional ratings
Review scores
Source	Rating
AllMusic	3.5/5 stars
The Guardian	4/5 stars
The Music Box	4/5 stars
Uncut	1/5 stars

AllMusic's Mark Deming writes "The vast majority of Hiatt's albums fall into one of two categories -- brilliant and real good. Beneath This Gruff Exterior falls into the latter file, which means it isn't a revelation like Two Bit Monsters or Bring the Family, but it's got good songs sang by a great songwriter, and played by a rockin' little band with a real fine guitarist up front, and if that's not what you're looking for, you're probably not much on Hiatt anyway." Billboard writes "Though it doesn’t always occur, when singer/songwriter John Hiatt collaborates with his erstwhile backing band the Goners, magic tends to happen. This debut on New West is a case in point, with Hiatt’s top-shelf songwriting and expressive vocals and the Goners’ tough instrumentation making for a delicious gumbo." T.J. Simon of The Music Box writes "the entire disc is chock full of the absorbing lyrics one would (and should) expect from Hiatt. For newcomers to the Hiatt party, this isn’t necessarily the disc with which I’d start — try Bring the Family first — but the already-converted will be generally pleased with the quality of this new release."

== Track listing ==
All tracks are written by John Hiatt.

No.	Title	Length
1.	"Uncommon Connection"	4:11
2.	"How Bad's the Coffee"	3:56
3.	"The Nagging Dark"	3:15
4.	"My Baby Blue"	4:35
5.	"My Dog and Me"	3:15
6.	"Almost Fed Up with the Blues"	4:36
7.	"Circle Back"	4:30
8.	"Window on the World"	3:36
9.	"Missing Pieces"	4:06
10.	"Fly Back Home"	4:44
11.	"The Last Time"	4:53
12.	"The Most Unoriginal Sin"	4:15
Total length:		50:00

== Personnel ==
- John Hiatt – guitar, vocals

and the Goners:

- Sonny Landreth – electric guitar, slide guitar, Dobro, backing vocals
- David Ranson – bass guitar
- Kenneth Blevins – drums, backing vocals

with:

- Bobby Keys – saxophone

Technical

- Don Smith – production, nixing, engineering
- Doug Sax – mastering
- Kimberly Levitan – art direction, design
- Michael "Mick" Wilson – photography
