= I Can't Be New =

Studio album by Susan Werner
- Released: March 9, 2004
- Genre: Jazz pop Vocal jazz Swing
- Length: 40:09
- Label: Koch
- Producer: Crit Harmon

Susan Werner chronology
New Non-Fiction (2001)	I Can't Be New (2004)	The Gospel Truth (2007)

Professional ratings
Review scores
Source	Rating
AllMusic	4/5 stars

I Can't Be New is the sixth album by American singer-songwriter Susan Werner, released in 2004.

== Track listing ==
all songs written by Susan Werner, except where noted

1. "I Can't Be New" (Jane Paul, Werner) – 2:54
2. "Late for the Dance" – 3:36
3. "Seeing You Again" – 2:41
4. "I'm Not Sure" – 4:15
5. "Much at All" – 4:08
6. "Tall Drink of Water" – 3:01
7. "You Come Through" – 3:13
8. "No One Needs to Know" – 2:58
9. "Let's Regret This in Advance" – 2:45
10. "Don't I Know You" – 3:05
11. "Philanthropy" – 2:53
12. "Stay on Your Side of Town" – 2:54
13. "Maybe If I Sang Cole Porter (Coda)" – 1:46

== Personnel ==
- Susan Werner – piano, rhythm guitar, ukulele, vocals, background vocals, Wurlitzer, nylon string guitar
- Eugene Friesen – cello
- Crit Harmon – percussion, handclapping, snaps
- Hatfield Five – string quartet
- Brad Hatfield – piano, Hammond organ, vibraphone, Fender Rhodes
- John Lockwood – upright bass
- Dave Mattacks – drums
- Billy Novick – clarinet, woodwind
- Stephen Sadler – banjo, dobro, mandolin, ukulele, baritone ukulele
- Mike Turk – chromatic harmonica

== Production ==
- Producer: Crit Harmon
- Engineer: Crit Harmon, John Lupfer
- Mixing: John Lupfer
- Mastering: Paul Angelli
- A&R: David Wilkes
- Digital editing: Matt Beaudoin
- Arranger: Billy Novick
- Product manager: Dan O'Leary
- Design: Jeff Gilligan
- Caricatures: Adam Belmares
