= Like Dreamers Do (The Radiators song) =

Single by The Radiators

from the album Law of the Fish
- B-side: "This Wagon's Gonna Roll"
- Released: 1987
- Recorded: 1987
- Genre: Swamp rock; roots rock
- Length: 4:04
- Label: Epic
- Songwriter(s): Ed Volker
- Producer(s): Rodney Mills

The Radiators singles chronology
"Like Dreamers Do" (1987)	"Doctor Doctor" (1988)

"Like Dreamers Do" is a song by American rock band The Radiators from their 1987 album Law of the Fish. Written by frontman Ed Volker, it features a swamp rock style that characterizes the album.

The song was released as a single and became a minor hit, reaching number 23 on the Mainstream Rock chart.

== Background ==
Songwriter Ed Volker composed the song based on dream about a book by Carlos Castaneda. "Like Dreamers Do" features a melodic piano-driven hook and a guitar solo. As one of the band's signature songs, it has become a standard in their live performances.

== Reception ==
Jay Miller of The Patriot Ledger called the song "among the band’s most mainstream-sounding rockers, and a terrific power ballad." Jim Washburn of the Los Angeles Times was largely critical of a 1991 performance by The Radiators, but praised their rendition of "Like Dreamers Do" as the band hitting "a persuasive groove, sinking into a New Orleans second-line rhythm that seemed so forced on other songs." Kevin Wuench of the Tampa Bay Times called the music video "delightful". OffBeat magazine's John Swenson noted that guitarist Dave Malone's "expressive take" on the song "deserved the radio polish [it] got."

== Charts ==
Chart (1987)	Peak position
US Billboard Mainstream Rock	23
