= Work Done on Premises =

Live album by The Radiators
- Released: 1980
- Recorded: Tipitina's, New Orleans, Louisiana
- Genre: Swamp rock
- Length: LP: 76:23 / CD: 71:30
- Label: Croaker Records
- Producer: Bill Cat and The Radiators

The Radiators chronology
Work Done on Premises (1980)	Heat Generation (1981)

Professional ratings
Review scores
Source	Rating
Allmusic	4/5 stars

Work Done on Premises is the first album and first live album released by The Radiators (US).

== Overview ==
Three years after they were formed, The Radiators finally released their first album on their own Croaker label. The album is a live concert recording of a performance at Tipitina's nightclub in the band's home of New Orleans on May 9, 1980. Originally released as a double LP, the album was later re-released as a single CD.

== Original vinyl track listing ==
All tracks are written by Ed Volker, unless otherwise noted.

Side one
No.	Title	Writer(s)	Length
1.	"Hard Core"	Ed Volker; Dave Malone; Camile Baudoin; Reggie Scanlan; Frank Bua Jr.	5:05
2.	"If Your Heart Ain't In It"		3:49
3.	"Cannibal Girls"		4:29
4.	"One Eyed Jack"		4:35

Side two
No.	Title	Writer(s)	Length
1.	"Screw Loose"		3:40
2.	"Light Up My Pipe"		6:00
3.	"Hard To Tell"	Ed Volker; Dave Malone	3:18
4.	"Red Dress"	Ed Volker; Dave Malone	7:20

Side three
No.	Title	Length
1.	"Bad Taste"	4:51
2.	"Lowlife"	9:51
3.	"Stealin' A Feelin'"	4:28

Side four
No.	Title	Length
1.	"Creepin' Vine"	2:35
2.	"Deep In The Night"	5:57
3.	"Number Two Pencil"	10:25
Total length:		76:23

== CD ==
No.	Title	Writer(s)	Length
1.	"Hard Core"	Ed Volker; Dave Malone; Camile Baudoin; Reggie Scanlan; Frank Bua Jr.	5:19
2.	"Cannibal Girls"		4:33
3.	"One Eyed Jack"		4:43
4.	"Screw Loose"		3:47
5.	"Light Up My Pipe"		6:04
6.	"Red Dress"	Ed Volker; Dave Malone	8:28
7.	"Bad Taste Of Your Stuff"		4:54
8.	"Lowlife"		9:57
9.	"Stealin' A Feelin'"		4:26
10.	"Baby I`m Creepin' Vine"		2:43
11.	"Deep In The Night"		6:00
12.	"Number Two Pencil"		10:36
Total length:			71:30

== Credits ==
- Camile Baudoin — guitars and vocals
- Frank Bua — drums
- Dave Malone — guitars and vocals
- Reggie Scanlan — bass
- Ed Volker — percussion, piano, horn and vocals
- Bill Cat — producer
- The Radiators — producer
