= Hayseed (album) =

Studio album by Susan Werner
- Released: June 25, 2013
- Genre: Contemporary folk
- Length: 40:20
- Label: Sleeve Dog Records
- Producer: Crit Harmon

Susan Werner chronology
Kicking the Beehive (2011)	Hayseed (2013)

Hayseed is the ninth studio album by the American singer-songwriter Susan Werner. It was released in 2013 (see 2013 in music). The project was commissioned by the University of Nebraska–Lincoln's Lied Center for Performing Arts. The album is a concept album about people and lifestyles in farm towns in rural America, with songs inspired by local characters.

Werner, an Iowa native from a farming family, has taken a strong interest in promoting local and sustainable agriculture, themes which are dealt with on the album in songs such as "Herbicides" about herbicides and marriage equality and "Snowmobiles" about global warming. The album was initially funded through PledgeMusic, with ten percent of donations earmarked for Practical Farmers of Iowa, the Midwest Organic and Sustainability Education Service (in Spring Valley, Wisconsin) and The Land Institute. Before and after the album's official release, Werner began touring the country in a series of shows called "The Hayseed Project", in which she purchases, samples, and gives away local produce before or during her shows.

== Track listing ==
All songs written by Susan Werner

1. "City Kids (The Revenge of Kevin Oberbroeckling)" – 2:32
2. "Back to the Land" – 3:36
3. "Snowmobiles (The Worries of Patrick Lundquist)" – 3:39
4. "Bumper Crop" – 2:28
5. "While You Wait for the Rain" – 4:46
6. "Egg Money (The Confession of Irene Broghammer)" – 3:32
7. "Herbicides" – 2:23
8. "Something to be Said" – 4:00
9. "Plant the Stars" – 3:40
10. "Iowa" – 3:09
11. "Ode to Aldo Leopold" – 3:11
12. "Farm Sale December 8, 2012" – 2:33 (Hidden track)

== Personnel ==
- Susan Werner – composer, acoustic guitar, primary artist, vocals
- Gilat Bailen – children's chorus
- Marty Ballou – electric bass guitar, upright bass
- Sonny Barbato – accordion
- Fiona Campbell – children's chorus
- Melissa Fine – children's chorus
- Concetta Gordon – backing vocals
- Jim Gwin – drums
- Duke Levine – banjo, acoustic guitar, electric guitar, mandolin, octave mandolin
- Laurie MacAllister – backing vocals
- Maya Mokady – children's chorus
- Mimi Rabson – fiddle
- Steve Sadler – Dobro, acoustic guitar, lap steel guitar, mandolin, octave mandolin
- Patricia Washienko – guest artist, percussion
- Dagney Winner – children's chorus
- Ashleigh Woolf – children's chorus

== Production ==
- Producer: Crit Harmon
- Cover art Concept: Amy Reeder
- Engineer: Sean Cahalin, Crit Harmon, Lisa Yves
- Editing: BJ Mansuetti
- Graphic design: Krista Loewen
- Mastering: Glenn Barratt
- Photography: Tracy Button
- Video: James Davies
