= Susan Werner =

American singer-songwriter

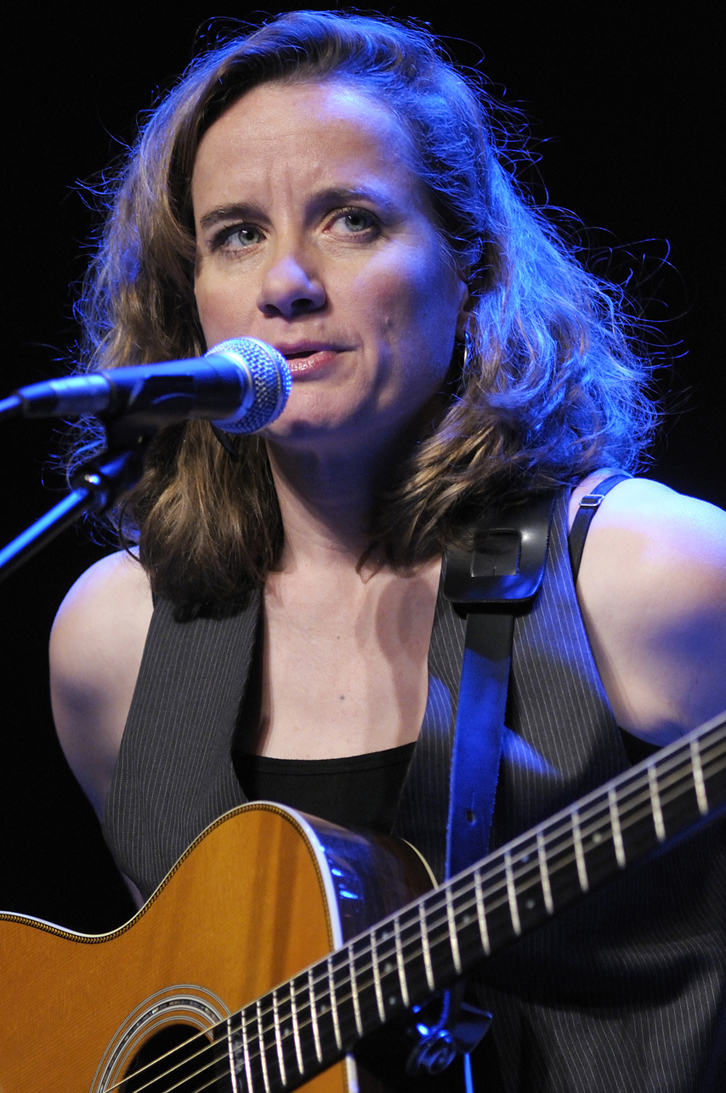
- Werner in 2011

Background information
- Born: 1965 (age 60–61)
- Genres: Folk; jazz; gospel
- Occupations: Singer-songwriter; musician
- Instruments: Vocals; guitar; piano; stompbox; harmonica
- Years active: 1993–present
- Labels: Susan Werner; Private Music/BMG; Velvel Records; Koch Records; Sleeve Dog Records
- Website: www.susanwerner.com

Susan Werner (born 1965) is an American singer-songwriter. Much of Werner's work has been in the contemporary folk genre.

== Career ==
Werner was raised on her family's farm near Manchester, Iowa, about an hour west of Dubuque. She became interested in music at a young age and went on to receive a bachelor's degree in voice at the University of Iowa. In 1987, she moved to Philadelphia, and earned a master's degree in voice at Temple University. Werner initially wanted a career in opera, but after seeing a Nanci Griffith performance became inspired and began composing songs of her own on acoustic guitar.

Performing around Philadelphia, Boston, and New York City, Susan began making a name for herself in the folk scene of the early 1990s. She recorded five albums from 1993 to 2001, and in 2001 she moved to Chicago. Her first five albums were all in the folk genre, but Werner's sixth album, I Can't Be New (2004), was a substantial departure, with original material in the vein of Tin Pan Alley, cabaret, and early jazz torch songs.

Werner's seventh album, The Gospel Truth, was released in March 2007 and addresses themes of religion, faith, social responsibility, as well as religion from an agnostic's point of view. In 2010, Tom Jones recorded "Did Trouble Me", from Werner's The Gospel Truth, for his album Praise & Blame.

Her eighth album, Live at Club Passim is collection of original songs (gospel, jazz & folk) recorded with her band: Colleen Sexton, Trina Hamlin & bassist Greg Holt. For her ninth album, Classics, she performs pop music from the 1960s and 1970s accompanied by chamber instruments.

Her tenth album, entitled Kicking the Beehive, was released in March 2011. Produced by Rodney Crowell, it features guest appearances from Vince Gill, Keb' Mo and Paul Franklin. Her album Hayseed, a concept album about "farms, farmers, and the people who love them", was released in the summer of 2013.

Werner branched out to write the music and lyrics for a musical based on the film Bull Durham, which premiered at Atlanta's Alliance Theatre on September 3, 2014.

In 2017 Werner released An American In Havana, an EP featuring six songs written during two trips to Cuba in 2015 and 2016.

== Personal life ==
Werner was born into a musical family. Her mother was a singer, although her father's musical ability was limited to "whistling on pitch". All five of her siblings are musically talented. One brother is a professional stand-up comedian and another brother is a performing drag queen.

== Discography ==
- Midwestern Saturday Night (1993)
- Live at Tin Angel (1993)
- Last of the Good Straight Girls (1995)
- Time Between Trains (1998)
- New Non-Fiction (2001)
- I Can't Be New (2004)
- The Gospel Truth (2007)
- Live at Passim (2008)
- Classics (2009)
- Kicking The Beehive (2011)
- Live at The Center for Arts in Natick (2011)
- Hayseed (2013)
- Eight Unnecessary Songs (2014)
- An American in Havana (2017)
- NOLA (2019)
- Flyover Country (2020)
- Halfway to Houston (2024)
- Eight MORE Unnecessary Songs (2026)
- The Greatest Hits (2026)
