= C. C. Adcock (album) =

C.C. Adcock

Studio album by C.C. Adcock
- Released: 1994
- Studio: Dockside, Lil' Milton, Fidelity, Sunnyside, Compass Point
- Genre: Swamp pop, blues rock
- Length: 34:48
- Label: Island
- Producer: Tarka Cordell

C.C. Adcock chronology
C.C. Adcock (1994)	House Rocker (2000)

C.C. Adcock is the debut album by the Louisianan swamp-rock musician of the same name, released in 1994 on Island Records. It was recorded mainly in Lafayette, Louisiana, and Los Angeles, California.

== Critical reception ==
Professional ratings
Review scores
Source	Rating
AllMusic	3/5 stars
Los Angeles Times	(favorable)
Orlando Sentinel	4/5 stars
The Rolling Stone Jazz & Blues Album Guide	3.5/5 stars
Sun-Sentinel	(favorable)
The Village Voice	(choice cut)

A review of the album in Guitar Player said that it "delivers a heady brew of swamp riffs wrapped in slapback echo, slippery tremolo, and other exotic sounds".

== Track listing ==
1. Couchemal – 4:19 (C.C. Adcock)
2. Beaux's Bounce – 2:15 (Ellis McDaniel)
3. Cindy Lou – 2:20 (Eddie Shuler, Shelton Dunaway)
4. What I Like (Women's) – 4:56 (Adcock)
5. Sally Sue Brown – 2:26 (Arthur Alexander, Earl Montgomery, Tom Stafford)
6. Kissin' Kouzans – 3:54 (Adcock)
7. I'm Just a Fool to Care – 3:00 (Art Neville)
8. Good Lovin' – 2:01 (Bobby Charles Guidry)
9. Do Right Lil' Lady – 3:54 (Adcock)
10. Done Most Everything – 5:34 (Adcock, Guidry)
