= Tipitina's =

American music venue

Coordinates: 29.9173°N 90.1009°W

- Tips
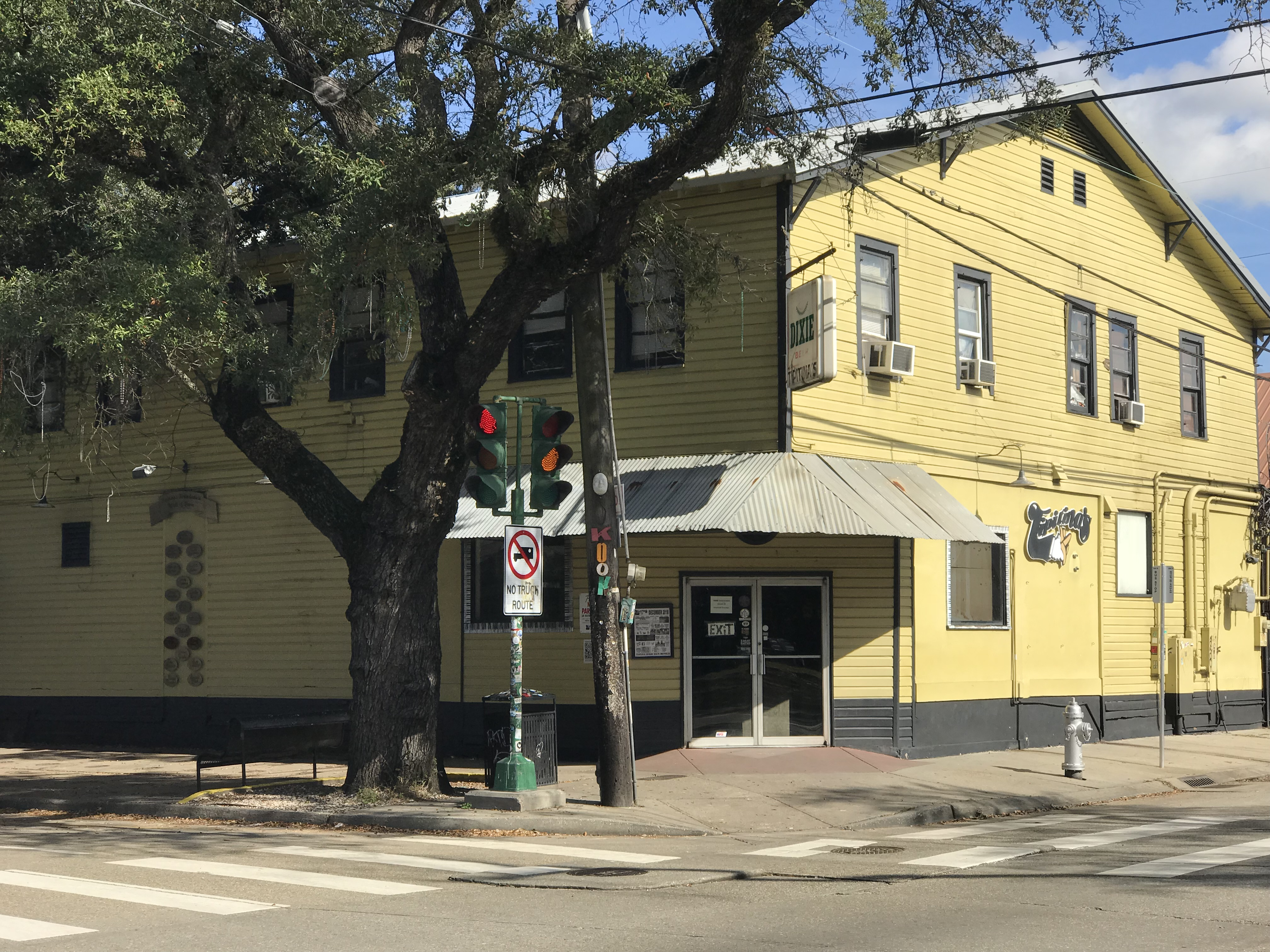
- Tipitina's Uptown
- Interactive map of Tipitina's
- Location: 501 Napoleon Ave., New Orleans, Louisiana
- Owner: Galactic
- Capacity: 800
- Type: Concert Hall
- Events: R&B, Rock, Jazz

Construction
- Built: 1912
- Opened: January 14, 1977

Website
- Tipitinas.com

Tipitina's is a music venue located at the corner of Napoleon Avenue and Tchoupitoulas Street in Uptown New Orleans, Louisiana, United States.

== History ==
Local music enthusiasts opened the venue on January 14, 1977. The name was inspired by a well-known song, "Tipitina", by Professor Longhair who also performed there until his death in 1980. Before adopting use of "Tipitina's" as its name, the facility was known as "The 501 Club," in reference to its street address (501 Napoleon Avenue). Tipitina's stands as one of the best-known clubs in New Orleans. The building itself was constructed in 1912, and prior to becoming Tipitina's, it served as a gambling house, gymnasium, and brothel.

In the early years, it had a juice bar, restaurant, and a bar. The only remnant of the juice bar is the banana in Tipitina's logo. In the early 1980s, the studios of radio station WWOZ were located in one of the apartments upstairs from the club. During that time, WWOZ would occasionally carry a Tipitina's show live by literally lowering a microphone into the club through a hole in the floor. Tipitina's closed for a time during the 1984 World's Fair, when much of the local music scene was drawn to venues in and around the Fair. The building was then remodeled to remove the upstairs apartments in favor of a higher ceiling in the downstairs music venue and reopened.

In 1998, Tipitina's opened a second location on North Peters Street in the French Quarter, which for a time was also a regular live music venue as well as open for private events and parties but is currently closed. Apart from running these venues, Tipitina's established the Tipitina's Foundation, a non-profit organization to support local music and musicians. The main focus of the Tipitina's Foundation was to provide musical instruments and uniforms to New Orleans public high school marching bands. The Foundation was especially active in supporting the musicians victimized by Hurricane Katrina. The Tipitina's Foundation closed shortly after Tipitina's was sold in late 2018.

During the annual New Orleans Jazz & Heritage Festival period, Tipitina's hosts a concert series titled "Fess Jazztival", which is a play on "Jazz Festival" and Professor Longhair's nickname, "Fess".

In December 2018, Tipitina's was purchased by the members of the New Orleans–based jam band Galactic from Mary and Roland von Kurnatowski, who had owned the venue since 1997. Galactic formed the Tip-It Foundation, after purchasing the club. The Tip-It Foundation's mission is to support and promote the future of the Gulf South's music, culture and heritage via the Tipitina's venue and brand.

== Live albums ==
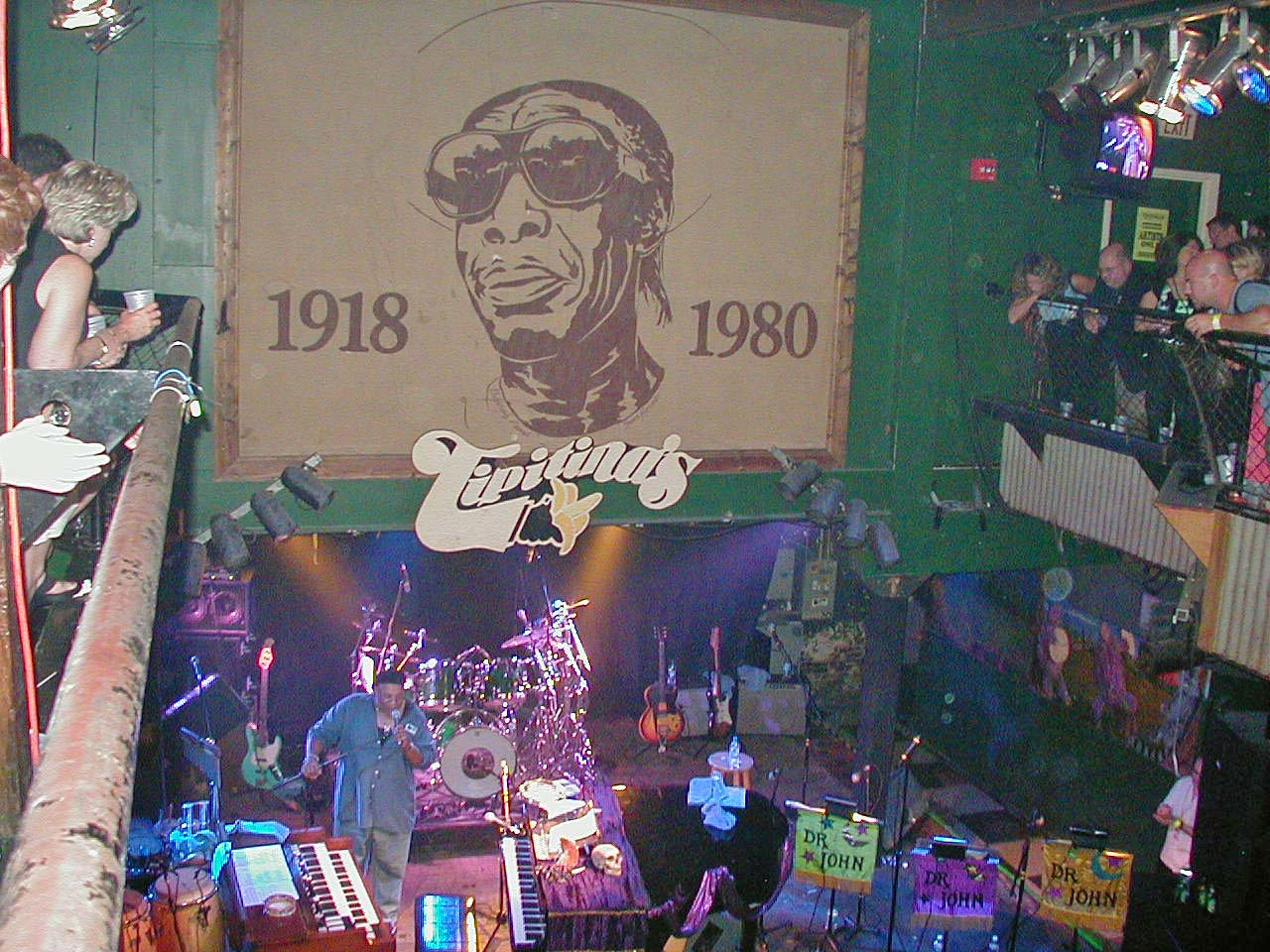
The interior of the club with big portrait of Professor Longhair

Numerous live albums have been recorded at Tipitina's, including:

- The Radiators / Work Done on Premises (1980)
- The Neville Brothers / Nevillization: Live at Tipitina's (1982)
- Jane's Addiction / Live – Tipitina's, New Orleans, LA, 16 Jan '89 (1989)
- Piano Night at Tipitina's (1995)
- Anders Osborne / Live at Tipitina's (1998)
- Galactic / We Love 'Em Tonight: Live at Tipitina's (2001)
- Professor Longhair / Ball the Wall: Live at Tipitina's 1978 (2004)
- The Radiators / Earth vs. The Radiators: the First 25 (2004)
- Tuts Washington / Live at Tipitina's '78 (2005)
- Dr. John / Right Place, Right Time: Live at Tipitina's (2006)
- Bonerama / Bringing It Home (2007)
- The Blind Boys of Alabama / Live in New Orleans (2009) DVD
- Phish / New Orleans Relief (2010)
- Mem Shannon / Live: A Night at Tipitina's (2007)
- Black Top Blues-a-rama Vol. 1–7
- Tipitina's is featured prominently in Wilco's Wilco Live: Ashes of American Flags documentary and the accompanying downloadable live album

== See also ==
- List of jazz clubs
- List of music venues
